= List of Jamestown colonists =

List of colonial settlers arriving in Jamestown Colony, Virginia, from 1607-1667

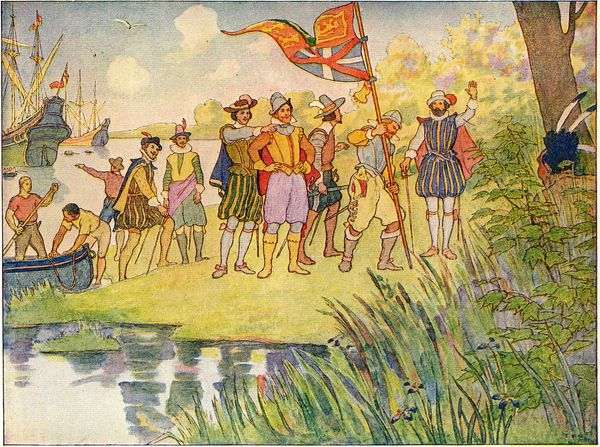
Painting of John Smith and colonists landing in Jamestown

On 4 May [O.S. 14 May] 1607, 105 to 108 English men and boys (surviving the voyage from England) established James Towne for the Virginia Company of London, on a slender peninsula on the bank of the James River. It became the first long-term English settlement in North America.

The trips aboard the ships Susan Constant, Discovery, and the Godspeed, and the settlement itself, were sponsored by the London Company, whose "adventurers" (investors) hoped to make a profit from the resources of the New World. The settlers suffered terrible hardships in its early years, including sickness, starvation, and native attacks. By early 1610, most of the settlers had died due to starvation and disease. With resupply and additional immigrants, it managed to endure, becoming America's first permanent English colony.

Once the settlement location was chosen, the company members opened sealed instructions containing the list of the previously chosen councillors of the Virginia Governor's Council. The first council president was Edward Maria Wingfield. The other six council members were Bartholomew Gosnold, John Martin, John Ratcliffe, George Kendall, Christopher Newport (ex officio) and John Smith.

== Original settlers ==
Council members in bold. Titles and occupations are from era accounts, but use modern British spellings.

On December 30, 1606, between 105 and 108 settlers with 39 mariners (non-settlers) sailed aboard three ships from Blackwall, London, England.

Original Jamestown settlers (May 1607):
Name	Occupation	Alt. names	Death date (YYYY-MM-DD) (Note: Dates are in Old Style calendar (the New Year begins on March 25).)	Notes
Henry Adling	Gentleman	Adding, H.		
Jerome Alicock	Gentleman	Alikok Ancient, Jeremy	1607–08–04	Slain by Natives
Gabriel Archer	Captain and Gentleman	Archer, Gabriell	1609 or 1610 winter	Secretary to the Council (lawyer)
John Asbie			1607–08–06	First death of the colony (dysentery)
Robert Beheathland	Captain and Gentleman	Behethland, R.	1627	
Benjamin Best	Gentleman	Beast, B.	1607–09–05	
Edward Brinto	Mason and Soldier	Brinton, E.		
Edward Brookes	Gentleman		1607–04–07	Died in the West Indies (before arriving to Virginia)
John Brookes	Gentleman			
Edward Browne	Gentleman	Brown, E.	1607–08–15	
James Brumfield	Boy	Brunfield, J.		
Andrew Buckler	Shipmaster	Bucler, A.	1625	
William Bruster	Gentleman	Brewster, W.	1607–08–10	Died from Native wound
John Capper	Carpenter			Not listed [as alive] after June 1607
George Cassen	Labourer	Cawson, G.	1607–12–26	Tortured and killed by Natives
Thomas Cassen	Labourer			
William Cassen	Labourer			
Ustis Clovill	Gentleman	Clovill, Eustice	1607–06–07	Killed by Natives
Samuel Collier	Boy	Dutch Samuel	1622	accidental friendly fire of an English sentinel during the Powhatan uprising
Roger Cooke	Gentleman			
Thomas Couper	Barber	Cowper, T.		
Richard Crofts	Gentleman			
Richard Dixon	Gentleman			
John Dods	Labourer and Soldier			"1624 VA muster with wife Jane, 40 at muster, he was 36"
Ould Edward	Labourer			
Thomas Emry	Carpenter		1607–12–26	Killed by Natives
Robert Fenton	Gentleman	Robart Fentonne		
George Floure	Gentleman	Flowre, G.	1607–08–09	
Robert Ford	Gentleman			
Richard Frith	Gentleman			
Stephen Galithrope	Gentleman	Calthrop, Halthrop	1607–08–10	Possible mutineer
William Garrett	Bricklayer			
George Golding	Labourer	Goulding, G.		
Thomas Gore	Gentleman	Gower, T.	1607–08–16	
Anthony Gosnold	Gentleman		1609–01–07	Possibly two cousins with identical names. Drowned Jan 1609 in James River. Grandson of Robert Gosnold of Earl Soham, Suffolk.
**Bartholomew Gosnold**	**Councillor [sic] and Captain**		1607–08–22	Captain of the Godspeed
Edward Harrington	Gentleman		1607–08–24	
John Herd	Bricklayer			not listed [as alive] after June 1607
Nicholas Houlgrave	Gentleman			
Robert Hunt	Preacher		before 1609	
Thomas Jacob	Sergeant (soldier)	Jacon, T.	1607–09–04	
William Johnson	Labourer			
**George Kendall**	**Councillor and Captain**		1607–12–01	Execution by firing squad for "mutiny"
Ellis Kingston	Gentleman	E. Kiniston or Kinnistone	1607–09–18	"Starved to death with cold"
John Laydon	Carpenter and Labourer	Leyden		arrived on the Susan Constant
William Laxon	Carpenter	Laxton, W.		
William Love	Tailor and Soldier	Loue, W.		
**John Martin**	**Councillor and Captain**	Martine, J	1632-06-??	Lower Brandon Plantation owner
John Martin, Jr.	Gentleman		1607–09–18	Son of Councillor
George Martin	Gentleman			
James Midwinter	Gentleman	Francis Midwinter	1607–08–14	Died suddenly
Edward Morish	Corporal and Gentleman	Morris, E.	1607–08–14	Died suddenly
Thomas Mounslie	Labourer		1607–08–17	Died suddenly
Thomas Mouton	Gentleman		1607–09–19	
Richard Mutton	Boy			
Nathaniel Peacock	Boy	Pecock, N.		
John Penington	Gentleman	Pennington, J.	1608-08-18	
Robert Penington	Gentleman	Pennington, R.		
George Percy	Gentleman, Shipmaster	Percie	1632	Eventual Governor of Virginia Colony. Son of Henry Percy, 8th Earl of Northumberland.
Drue Pickhouse	Gentleman	Dru Piggas or Peggase	1607–08–19	
Edward Pising	Carpenter	Posing, E.		
Nathaniel Powell	Captain and Gentleman	Nathaniell	1622–03–22	Served as acting Governor of Virginia Colony in 1619
**John Ratcliffe**	**Councillor and Captain**	Sicklemore, J.	1609-11-??	Captain of the Discovery, eventual Governor
James Read	Blacksmith and Soldier		1622–03–13	
John Robinson	Gentleman	Jehu	1607–12–26	Killed by Natives
William Rods	Labourer	Roods, W.	1607–08–27	not listed [as alive] after June 1607
Thomas Sands	Gentleman	Sandys, T.		Brother of Edwin Sandys (1561–1629)
Edward Short	Labourer		1607-08-??	
John Short	Gentleman			
Richard Simons	Gentleman	Simmons, R.	1607–09–18	
Nicholas Scot	Drummer	Skot, N.		
Robert Small	Carpenter			
**John Smith**	**Councillor and Captain**	Smyth, J.	1631-06-??	
William Smethes	Gentleman			
Francis Snarsbrough	Gentleman			
John Stevenson	Gentleman			
Thomas Studley	Gentleman, Cape Merchant	Stoodie, T.	1607–08–28	
William Tanker	Gentleman	Tankard, W.		
Henry Tavin	Labourer	Tanin, H.		
Kellam Throgmorton	Gentleman	Throgmortine, Kenelme	1607–08–26	
Anas Todkill	Carpenter and Soldier			Servant to John Martin and later explorer. Accompanied John Smith on several expeditions.
William Unger	Labourer			
George Walker	Gentleman		1607-08-24	
Thomas Walker				
John Waller	Gentleman	Waler	1607–08–24	
Thomas Webbe	Gentleman			
William White	Labourer			
William Wilkinson	Surgeon			
**Edward Maria Wingfield**	**Councillor and Captain**	Edward Marie Winfield	1631	Captain of Susan Constant
Thomas Wotton	Surgeon			
Richard	Commoner			

=== Mariners ===
Known mariners and others with the colonists (but did not remain at Jamestown):
  1. Bragg, Thomas - Teenaged Deckhand of Christopher Newport
  2. Bragg, George - Teenaged Deckhand of Christopher Newport
  3. Browne, Oliver - Mariner
  4. Clarke, Charles - Mariner
  5. Collson (or Cotson), John - Mariner
  6. Crookdeck, John - Mariner
  7. Deale, Jeremy - Mariner
  8. Fitch (Finch), Mathew - Mariner
  9. Genoway, Richard - Mariner
  10. Godword, Thomas - Mariner
  11. Jackson, Robert - Mariner
  12. Markham (Marcum), Robert - Mariner (would later settle in Virginia and become a fugitive known as "Moutapass")
  13. Morton, Matthew - Sailor
  14. Nelson, Francys (Francis) - Captain
  15. Poole, Jonas - Mariner
  16. Skynner, Thomas - Mariner
  17. Tyndall (Tindall), Robert - Mariner, Surveyor
  18. Turnbrydge (or Turbridge), Thomas - Mariner
  19. **Newport, Christopher - Captain, Councillor ex officio (d. 1617)**
  20. White, Benjamyn - Mariner
  21. Danynell
  22. Stephen

== First Supply settlers ==
Aboard the John and Francis (captained by Christopher Newport) and the Phoenix (captained by Francis Nelson), The John and Francis arrived in January, while the Phoenix was considered lost (but arrived months later). 120 settlers left England in October 1607. Only 100 made it to Virginia to settle. When they arrived at Jamestown, there were only 38 to 40 men that had survived the summer and autumn "seasoning time".

1. Jefrey Abots, Gentleman
2. Robert Alberton, Perfumer
3. Robert Barnes, Gentleman
4. William Bayley, Gentleman
5. William Beckwith, Tailor
6. Richard Belfield, Refiner
7. William Bentley, Labourer
8. John Bouth, Labourer
9. Richard Brislow, Labourer
10. William Burket, Labourer
11. James Burne
12. William Cantril, Gentleman
13. Nathaniel (William) Causey, Gentleman
14. Thomas Coo, Gentleman
15. Robert Cotton, Tobacco-pipe-maker
16. Robert Cutler, Gentleman
17. William Dawson, Refiner
18. Richard Dole, Blacksmith
19. Thomas Feld (Field), Apothecary
20. Richard Fetherstone
21. George Forest, Gentleman
22. Post Gittnat, Surgeon
23. Raymond Goodyson, Labourer
24. Richard Gradon, Labourer
25. William Gryvill, Gentleman
26. Edward Gurganay, Gentleman
27. John Harford, Apothecary
28. John Harper, Gentleman
29. George Hill, Gentleman
30. Thomas Hope, Tailor
31. William Johnson, Refiner
32. Peter Keffer, Gunner
33. Richard Killingbeck, Gentleman
34. Timothy Leeds, Gentleman
35. John Lewes (Lewis), Couper
36. William May, Labourer
37. Michaell
38. Richard Miler, Labourer
39. Richard Molynex, Gentleman
40. Ralfe Morton, Gentleman
41. Rowland Nelstrop, Labourer
42. John Nickoles, Gentleman
43. William Perce, Labourer
44. Francis Perkins, Labourer
45. Michaell Phetyplace, Gentleman
46. Captain William Phetyplace (Phettiplace), Gentleman
47. Peter Pory, Gentleman
48. Richard Pots, Gentleman, Council Clerk, returned to England c. 1609
49. John Powell, Tailor
50. George Pretty, Gentleman
51. Richard Prodget (Prodger), Gentleman
52. Jonas Profit, Fisherman and Sailor
53. Abraham Ransacke, Refiner
54. Christopher Rodes
55. Walter Russell, Gentleman and Doctor
56. Richard Savage (Salvage), Labourer
57. Thomas Savage (Salvage), Boy and Labourer
58. Matthew Scrivener, secretary, appointed to be of the Council (died January 7, 1609)
59. Lt. Michael Sicklemore, Gentleman
60. William Simons, Labourer
61. John Speareman, Labourer
62. William Spence, Labourer and Treasurer
63. Daniell Stalling, Jeweller
64. John Taverner, Gentleman
65. Laurence Towtales, Tailor
66. Nicholas Ven, Labourer
67. William Ward, Tailor
68. James Watkings
69. Vere
70. Richard Worley, Gentleman
71. Richard Wyffin, Gentleman
72. Bishop Wyles, Labourer
73. William Yonge, Tailor
74. "...with diverse others"
  1. Francisco Maguel (Miguel), an Irishman

== Second Supply settlers ==
Quickly after the first supply, Captain Newport boarded 70 new colonists to the Mary and Margaret. First women colonists are noted with female sign (♀️).

1. Thomas Abbey (Abbay), Gentleman
2. Gabriell Bedle (Bedell), Gentleman and Lumberjack
3. John Bedle (Bedell), Gentleman
4. Henry Bell, Tradesman
5. Thomas Bradley, Tradesman
6. ♀️Anne Burras, maid to Mistress Forrest
7. John Burras, Tradesman
8. George Burton, Gentleman
9. Captain Raleigh Croshaw, Gentleman
10. John Clarke, Tradesman
11. Henry Collings, Gentleman
12. John Dauxe, Gentleman
13. Thomas Dowse, Tabor player
14. William Dowman, Gentleman
15. David Ellis, Tradesman
16. Thomas Forrest, Gentleman
17. ♀️Mistress Margaret Forrest, Gentlewoman
18. Thomas Fox, Labourer
19. Thomas Gipson, Tradesman
20. Thomas Graves, Gentleman
21. John Gudderington, Gentleman
22. Hugh Gwyn (Wynne), Tradesman
23. Nicholas Hancock, Labourer
24. Thomas Holcroft
25. Hardwin, Labourer
26. Harmon Haryson, Gentleman
27. Hellyard, Boy
28. John Hoult, Gentleman
29. David ap Hugh, Tradesman
30. Master Hunt, Gentleman
31. Thomas Lavander (LaVinder), Tradesman
32. Henry Lee (Leigh, Ley), Gentleman
33. Michaell Lowicke, Gentleman
34. Captain Isaac Madison
35. Thomas Mallard, Labourer
36. Thomas Maxes, Gentleman
37. Milman, Boy
38. Morrell, Labourer
39. Thomas Norton, Gentleman
40. Dionis Oconor, Tradesman
41. Thomas Phelps, Tradesman
42. Henry Philpot, Gentleman
43. Master William Powell, Tradesman
44. John Prat, Tradesman
45. Rose, Labourer
46. John Chief Russell, Gentleman and Lumberjack (d. c. 1625)
47. William Russell, Gentleman
48. William Sambage, Gentleman
49. Master Scott (Scot), Labourer
50. Jefry Shortridge, Tradesman
51. William Taler, Labourer
52. Master Daniel Tucker, gentleman, cape merchant (treasurer), and store clerk
53. Walker, Labourer
54. Captain Richard (Ralph) Waldoe, appointed to the Council (d. Jan 1609)
55. Master Robert Wilde, store clerk
56. Williams, Labourer
57. Captain Peter Wynne (Winne), appointed to the Council (died April 1609)
58. Master Francis West, Gentleman
59. Hugh Wollystone, Gentleman
60. George Yarington, Gentleman
61. ...Eight Dutch men, Poles (known as the Jamestown Polish craftsmen), with some others
  1. Adam, German carpenter
  2. Jan Bogdan, Polish craftsman
  3. Franz, German carpenter
  4. Michal Lowicki, Polish craftsman
  5. Jan Mata, Polish craftsman
  6. Samuel, German carpenter
  7. Stanislaw Sadowski, Polish craftsman
  8. Zbigniew Stefanski, Polish craftsman
  9. Wilhelm Volday (William Waldi), Swiss-German general prospector

== Third Supply settlers ==
With 500 to 600 persons, a fleet of nine ships set sail in May 1609 led by Thomas Gates and George Somers. The ships were named Sea Venture, Diamond, Falcon, Blessing, Unity, Lion, Swallow, Virginia, and a boat referred to as "Catch" (or ketch).

In July, a tropical storm struck the flotilla. The "Catch" vanished with all aboard, and the Sea Venture shipwrecked on Bermuda, inadvertently colonizing the island. The seven remaining ships arrived at Jamestown only to bring diseased and hungry passengers to the stressed colony.

Council members in bold. Those who died in Bermuda (or were lost at sea) are indicated with a Latin cross (✝️). Titles and occupations are from era accounts, but use modern British spellings.

Third Supply passengers (May 1609):
Name	Occupation	Alt. names	Ships	Notes on travel
Gabriel Archer	Captain and gentleman	Archer, Gabriell	Blessing	Secretary to the Council, previously sailed with original colonists
Robert Adams	Captain		Blessing	
Henry Bagwell	Bagewell, Henery		Sea Venture → Deliverance	Traveled from Bermuda to Virginia on Deliverance, aged 35
Temperance Flowerdew	Wife of Richard Barrow	Flowerdew Barrow, T.	Falcon	Uncertain if husband Richard Barrow accompanied to Virginia
Nicolas Bennit	carpenter		Sea Venture	
William Brian			Sea Venture	
Jeffrey Briars ✝️			Sea Venture	Died in Bermuda, c. 1609-1610
Richard Buck	Reverend, Chaplain	Bucke or Bucket, R.	Sea Venture	Uncertain if traveled with children
Maria Thorowgood Buck		Marye Thorowgood	Sea Venture	Died 1620
Buck daughter (I)	child, girl	Bucket	Sea Venture	Unknown name, daughter of Richard Buck
Buck daughter (II)	child, girl	Bucket	Sea Venture	Unknown name, daughter of Richard Buck
William Capps	Saltmaker	William Moss Cappes, Sr.	Sea Venture (Note: It is unclear which ship William Capps arrived on. Capps was potentially marooned on Bermuda with the Sea Venture (most likely) or could have arrived safely to Virginia with Thomas Gates remaining flotilla.)	
Christopher Carter			Sea Venture	Plotted to assassinate Sir Thomas Gates, considered a deserter and stayed behind on Bermuda. Settled Smith's Island.
Thomasine Causey			Lion	Husband Nathaniel Causey was already in Virginia.
Josuah Chard		Chard, Joshua or Joseph	Sea Venture	
Edward Chard		Chart, E.	Sea Venture	Sailed back to Bermuda with George Somers, remained on Smith's Island
James Davis	Captain, mariner	Davies, J.	Virginia	From Popham Colony
Robert Davis	Shipmaster	Davies, R.	Virginia	Likely brother to James Davis
Rachell Davis	Wife of James Davis		Virginia	
Edward Chart			Sea Venture	
Bermudas Eason ✝️	baby boy	Easton, Bermudas	--	Born on Bermuda islands, died c. 1610 either on the islands or arriving at Jamestown
Edward Eason		Easton, E.	Sea Venture	Father to Bermudas (boy), husband to Mistress Eason
Mistress Eason		Easton	Sea Venture	Mother to Bermudas (boy), wife to Edward Eason
Matthew Fitch ✝️	Shipmaster	Finch, M.	Catch	Died c. July 1609 (likely lost at sea)
Richard Frobisher	Shipwright	Frubbusher, Robert	Sea Venture	Builder of the Deliverance on Bermuda
**Thomas Gates**	**Governor and Lt. General**		Sea Venture	
Thomas Godby			Sea Venture → Deliverance	Traveled rom Bermuda to Virginia on Deliverance, aged 36
George Grave		Graye, G.	Sea Venture	
Ralph Hamor	Captain	Haman, Raphe	Sea Venture	
Mistress Horton			Sea Venture	
William Hitchman ✝️			Sea Venture	Died on Bermuda, c. 1609-1610
Stephen Hopkins	merchant and tanner		Sea Venture	Protested leaving Bermuda, was almost executed for mutiny. Died 1644.
Elizabeth Joons	Girl	Jones, E.	Sea Venture	Probably aged 9 or 10
Samuel Jordan	Captain, gentleman		Sea Venture	
Silvester Jourdain	Writer, gentleman	Jordan, Sylvester	Sea Venture	Writer of A Discovery of the Barmudas [sic]
William King	Captain		Diamond	Mariner (did not remain in Virginia)
Richard Knowles			Sea Venture	
Richard Lewis ✝️			Sea Venture	Died in Bermuda, c. 1609-1610
John Lytefoote	Servant	Lightfoot, J.	Sea Venture → Patience	Servant living with William Peirce in 1624
**John Martin**	**Councillor and Captain**		Falcon	Original Jamestown settler, traveled back and forth from England
William Martin			Sea Venture	
Matchumps	Powhatan servant to Namontack		Sea Venture	
John Moone	Captain		Swallow	Mariner (did not remain in Virginia)
Richard Moore	Carpenter		Sea Venture	Returned to Bermuda as a deputy governor in 1612
Namontack ✝️	Powhatan translator	Namotacke	Sea Venture	Died 1610, slain by Matchumps in Bermuda
Francis Michell		Mitchell, F.	Sea Venture	
Francis Nelson	Shipmaster	Francys Nelson	Falcon	Mariner (did not remain in Virginia)
**Christopher Newport**	**Captain and Councillor** (ex officio)		Sea Venture	Mariner (did not remain in Virginia)
Henry Paine ✝️			Sea Venture	Executed (by gunshot) for refusing to report for watch patrol in Bermuda
Francis Pearepoint			Sea Venture	
Elizabeth Persons	Maidservant to Mistress Horton		Sea Venture	Would marry Thomas Powell on Bermuda, aged 30
William Peirce (Note: Not to be confused with an English immigrant in Plymouth, Massachusetts, with the same name and same named-wife.)	Soldier	Pierce, W. or Pearse	Sea Venture	
Joane Peirce (I)	Wife of William Peirce, mother of two Janes (II and III)	Pierce, Jone	Blessinge	
Joane Peirce (II)	girl	Jane Pierce	Blessing (Note: There is conflicting data on whether Jane Pierce (daughter of William and Joan) sailed with her father aboard Sea Venture or her mother on the Blessing. It is also debated if the found remains of a "Jane" are the same girl.)	
Jane Peirce (III)	girl	Joan	Blessing	
Michael Philes ✝️	Captain		Catch	Died at sea during the tropical storm, c. July 1609
Robert Pitt	Shipmaster	Arthur Pett	Unity	Could be purported member of the Pitt family, or a Robert Fitt who was active in 1625
Thomas Powell	Cook		Sea Venture	George Somers' cook. Married Elizabeth Persons in Bermuda
John Graye Proctor	Gentleman, Yeoman		Sea Venture	
**John Ratcliffe**	**Councillor**		Diamond	Original settler. Died c. 1609-1610 (tortured by Natives) after arriving in Virginia
Henry Ravens ✝️	Master's mate	Raven, H.	Sea Venture → pinnace (ship's boat)	Lost at sea (or killed by Native Americans) after sailing a pinnace for help after shipwreck on Bermuda, c. 1609
Humfrey Reede			Sea Venture	
Robert Rich	Soldier		Sea Venture	Author of "verse pamphlet", "Newes from Virginia: the lost flocke triumphant". Died in 1630 after returning to Bermuda.
Bermuda Rolfe ✝️	baby girl		--	John Rolfe and Sarah Hacker Rolfe's daughter. Born on Bermuda islands, died on islands c. 1610
John Rolfe	tobacco trader		Sea Venture	
Sarah Hacker Rolfe ✝️	Wife of John Rolfe		Sea Venture	Either died in Bermuda or soon after reaching Virginia (c. spring 1610)
Edward Samuell ✝️	Samuel, E.		Sea Venture	Murdered by shipmate Edward Waters
Samuel Sharpe	Lieutenant (soldier)		Sea Venture	
William Sharpe	Sergeant (soldier)	Sgt Sharp	Sea Venture	
Henry Shelly		Mr. Shelly	Sea Venture	
**George Somers**	**Admiral of the Fleet, Councillor (ex officio)**		Sea Venture → Patience	Died upon return to Bermuda, November 1610
Matthew Somers	Captain	Mathew Somers	Swallow	Nephew of George Somers. Sailed to Bermuda and then back to England at some point in 1610.
Henry Spelman of Jamestown	teenaged boy, writer		Unity	
**William Strachey**	**Secretary-elect**, writer		Sea Venture	Author of True Reportory and other works
James Swift			Sea Venture	
Robert Walsingham	Cockswain		Sea Venture → Patience	Bermuda's Walsingham Bay and region namesakes are due to Robert. Walsingham piloted (and saved) the Patience during launch from Castle Harbour reefs.
James Want		John Want	Sea Venture	Refused to build boats to be rescued or to leave Bermuda
Edward Waters	Lieutenant (soldier)	Robert Waters	Sea Venture	Murdered shipmate Edward Samuell. Taken into custody, then to a tree and left to starve, but escaped by cutting the ropes. Remained in Bermuda afterward, settled Smith's Island.
George Webb	Captain, sergeant-major		Lion	
Thomas Whittingham ✝️	Cape merchant		Sea Venture → pinnace (ship's boat)	Lost at sea (or killed by Native Americans) after sailing a pinnace (with Henry Ravens) for help after marooning on Bermuda, 1609
Thomas Wood	Captain		Unity	
**George Yeardley**	**Captain of the guard for Thomas Gates**		Sea Venture	

== Fourth Supply settlers ==
Survivors from Bermuda (137-142 passengers and crew) salvaged the Sea Venture, and built two ships: Deliverance and Patience. The ships made it to Jamestown on May 23 to find only 60 starving colonists, and chose to abandon the colony.

=== Patience and Deliverance ===
Known surviving castaways from Bermuda and Sea Venture were:

1. Henry Bagwell
2. Mistress Maria Thorowgood Buck
3. Richard Buck
4. William Capps
5. Edward Eason
6. Mistress Eason
7. Richard Frobisher
8. Thomas Gates
9. Thomas Godby
10. Stephen Hopkins
11. Elizabeth Joons
12. Silvester Jourdain
13. Matchumps
14. Elizabeth Powell (née Persons)
15. Thomas Powell
16. Robert Rich
17. John Rolfe
18. Mistress Sarah Hacker Rolfe
19. George Somers
20. William Strachey
21. Robert Walsingham
22. George Yeardley

=== De La Warr's mission ===
At the same time, Thomas West, 3rd Baron De La Warr and Samuel Argall (after hearing of John Smith's adventures), led a humanitarian mission from England with 150 men (including a doctor, some Frenchmen, a Swiss miner) and supplies. Aboard the Hercules (of Rye), Blessing (of Plymouth), and De La Warr (Note: A third ship, De La Warr (Delaware) name is debated, and even the ship itself to exist) ships, they intercepted the weary colonists in Chesapeake Bay departing Virginia and compelled them to return to Jamestown with the new provisions and passengers.

1. Captain Samuel Argall
2. Doctor Lawrence Bohun
3. Master Andrew Buckler
4. Sir Humphrey (Humfrey) Blunt
5. Reynold Booth
6. Captain Edward Brewster (Bruster)
7. Joan Chandler
8. Captain Ralph Hamor, secretary
9. Thomas Holcroft (Holdcroft)
10. William Henrick Faldoe, a Swiss mine-hunter
11. William Julian
12. Richard Kingsmill, on the Delaware
13. Captain Thomas Lawson
14. Reverend William Mease (Mays)
15. Master Anthony Scott, ensign
16. Master Stacy
17. Master Robert Tyndall, mariner
18. Thomas West, 3rd Baron De La Warr, "Lord Governor and Captain General"
19. Captain William West
20. Sir Ferdinando Wainmen (Wenman, Weinman), captain and gentleman, master of the ordnance

== Other settlers 1610-11 ==
The Hercules (of Rye), which had departed Virginia in July, 1610, returned to Virginia on April, 1611, with 30 passengers (captained by Robert Adams).

Captained by Nathaniel West, the Mary Ann brought over widow Mistress Francis West. The Mary and Thomas (Note: Ship Mary and Thomas name is often documented as Mary and James or Mary James.) brought over William Tucker and Richard Bolton (Boulten).

== Fifth Supply settlers ==
Both Thomas Dale and Thomas Gates led flotillas back to Virginia. Thomas Dale headed to the colony with 300 labourers, at the request of the London Company. The Starr (flagship), the Elizabeth, and Prosperous (with Vice Admiral Christopher Newport) also carried horses, poultry, goats, and rabbits.

Thomas Gates had three passenger ships (Sarah, (Note: Sarah might be the source of the ship name, Noah, which may be a transcription error.) Trial, Swan (Note: Swan ship might have been the same ship as Swan of Barnstaple)) and three livestock caravels, which arrived just after the Dale flotilla. Those who died before arriving in Virginia are indicated with a Latin cross (✝️).

=== Dale's supply ===
1. William Askew, on the Prosperous
2. William Bailey (Baylie, Baley), on the Prosperous
3. John Blore (Blower) I, on the Starr
4. Isaac Chaplin (Chaplyn), on the Starr
5. John Clarke, pilot
6. Phettiplace Clause (Close), on the Starr
7. Thomas Dale, "Marshall of Virginia", on the Starr
8. Henry Davis (Davies)
9. Adam Dixon (Dixson), ship caulker
10. John Flood (Floyd), on the Swan
11. Thomas Garnett, on the Swan
12. ✝️ Mistress Thomas Gates, wife of Gates
13. Daughter of Gates (I)
14. Daughter of Gates (II)
15. John Gundrie (Gunnery) I, on the Starr
16. William Morgan (Brookes/Jones), on the Starr
17. Robert Poole (Powell) I, on the Starr
18. Robert Poole (Powell) II, boy, on the Starr
19. John Poole (Powell), brother of Robert the elder, on the Starr
20. Reverend Mister Poole
21. Reverend Alexander Whitaker (Whiteaker), on the Starr

=== Gates's supply ===
1. Richard Biggs I, on the Swan
2. Thomas Boulding (Bouldin), on the Swan
3. Thomas Chapman I, on the Trial
4. Henry Coltman, on the Sarah (Note: A source claims that Coltman arrived on a ship named Noah, but this is likely a writing transcription error.)
5. Cecily Jordan Farrar, girl
6. Robert Greenleaf(e), on the Trial
7. Albiano (Aliano) Lupo, on the Swan
8. William Spencer I, yeoman, on the Sarah
9. Thomas Sully, on the Sarah
10. Robert Wright, sawyer, on the Swan

== See also ==
- History of Jamestown, Virginia (1607–1699)
- Timeline of Jamestown, Virginia

== Notes ==
Footnotes

== Additional reading ==
- Bernard Bailyn, The Barbarous Years: The Peopling of British North America: The Conflict of Civilizations, 1600-1675 (Vintage, 2012)
- Warren M. Billings (Editor), The Old Dominion in the Seventeenth Century: A Documentary History of Virginia, 1606-1700 (University of North Carolina Press, 2007)
- James Horn, A Land as God Made It (Perseus Books, 2005)
- Margaret Huber, Powhatan Lords of Life and Death: Command and Consent in Seventeenth-Century Virginia (University of Nebraska Press, 2008)
- William M. Kelso, Jamestown, The Buried Truth (University of Virginia Press, 2006)
- David A. Price, Love and Hate in Jamestown (Alfred A. Knopf, 2003)
- Helen C. Rountree, The Powhatan Indians of Virginia: Their Traditional Culture (University of Oklahoma Press, 2013)
- Ed Southern (Editor), Jamestown Adventure, The: Accounts of the Virginia Colony, 1605-1614 (Blair, 2011)
- Tony Williams, "The Jamestown Experiment: The Remarkable Story of the Enterprising Colony and the Unexpected Results that Shaped America" (Sourcebooks Inc, 2011)
- Jocelyn R. Wingfield, Virginia's True Founder: Edward Maria Wingfield and His Times (Booksurge, 2007)
- Benjamin Woolley, Savage Kingdom: The True Story of Jamestown, 1607, and the Settlement of America (Harper Perennial, 2008)
- William M. Kelso, Nicholas M. Luccketti, Beverly A. Straube, The Jamestown Rediscovery Archaeology Project
