= George Kendall (Jamestown council member) =

First English colonist executed in Virginia (1570–1608)

Captain George Kendall
- Born: c. 1570; Kingdom of England
- Died: December 1, 1608 (aged 37–38); Jamestown, Colony of Virginia
- Cause of death: Execution by firing squad
- Other names: Kendal, "Tindol"
- Occupation: Gentleman-adventurer
- Known for: Member of first Virginia Governor's Council
- Conviction: Mutiny
- Penalty: Death

George Kendall (b. c. 1570 – d. 1608) was a member of the first council appointed at Jamestown in the Colony of Virginia. He arrived with the founding fleet, and was sworn to the Governor's Council on 23 May [O.S. 13 May] 1607. After landfall was made at Jamestown Island, he was apparently instrumental in the construction of the first fortification. Kendall was accused of mutiny and executed by the council in 1608. He was the first person to be legally executed in British North America.

== Before Virginia ==
Kendall identified as "of Westminster" and had an older brother (name unknown) and younger brother, Lieutenant Edward Kendall.

George fought in the Low Countries in the 16th century, and claimed to be to related to the "Roos of Routh" (likely Ros of Yorkshire). Historians also affirm that George was cousin to Sir Edwin Sandys of the Virginia Company, and the Earl of Pembroke. George Kendall was referred to in letters as a "Scotchman" and may have been of Catholic faith.

== In Virginia ==
George Kendall was an original council member to Jamestown, Virginia. He arrived in May, 1607, with at least 100 other settlers. He was still a member of the council on June 22, 1607, when the first report was written and then willing to be sent to the Virginia Company in London. He was removed from the council, stripped of his arms, and imprisoned aboard a ship sometime between July and September 1607.

In fall 1607, a fight broke out between the blacksmith, James Read, and the council president, John Ratcliffe. The blacksmith was sentenced to hang, and while on the gallows, he persuaded Ratcliffe to speak with him in private about a plan to have John Smith installed as president. He accused Kendall of the view that Ratcliffe was a tyrant and that Kendall was an ally of the Powhatan. The blacksmith identified Kendall as a main conspirator in the plot. The blacksmith was pardoned for his crime because he supplied the information. Kendall, already a prisoner, was brought before the council to answer to the charges.

"[I'm] firmly convinced no person or people can ever prosper by indecency inhumanity, brutally and by disregarded human rights and human liberty. If you get me for defending the rights of men and women be they Indian or white it will be for a righteous cause."

There is debate as to whether Kendall was prosecuted for mutiny or for allegedly spying for Spain.

The verdict of guilty was pronounced by Ratcliffe, to which Kendall objected on the grounds that Ratcliffe was not the president's real name. Kendall argued that because Ratcliffe announced his punishment using his alias Ratcliffe, and not his real surname, Sicklemore, his sentence was nullified. The council responded by having Councillor John Martin announce Kendall's death sentence. Kendall was executed by firing squad on December 1, 1608. He is believed to be the first person executed by capital punishment in British North America.
