= Robert Rich (Bermuda settler) =

English soldier and adventurer (1585–1630)

Lord Robert Rich Esquire
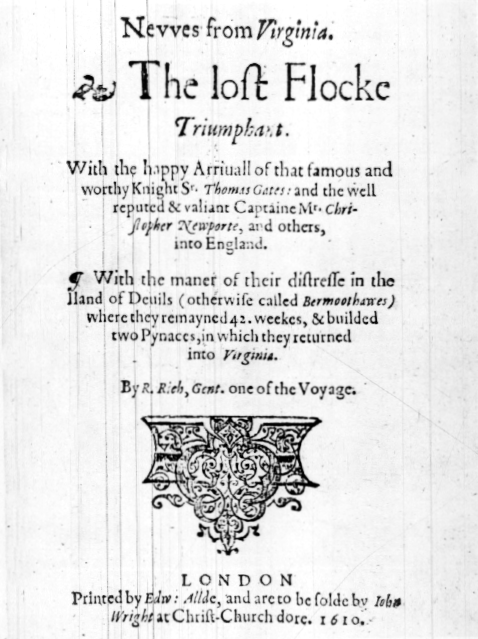
- Title page of "Newes from Virginia: the lost flocke triumphant" (1610)
- Born: fl. 1585; Kingdom of England
- Died: 1630; Somers Isles (Bermuda)
- Other name: Richard Rich
- Occupations: Soldier, adventurer, chronicler
- Notable work: "Newes from Virginia: the lost flocke triumphant" (1610)

Lord Robert Rich (sometimes incorrectly referred to as Richard Rich (Note: Lord Robert Rich is listed as "Richard Rich, Esq." on the Sea Venture Memorial in Bermuda.)) (b. c. 1585 - d. 1630) was an English soldier and traveler.

Robert aspired to colonize Virginia, and set out in 1609 to the Jamestown, Virginia settlement. During the journey, a tropical storm caused the ship, the Sea Venture to be run aground on the reefs of the uninhabited St. George's Island, Bermuda. Along with Rich, George Somers, Thomas Gates, William Strachey, Silvester Jourdain, and other settlers were castaways.

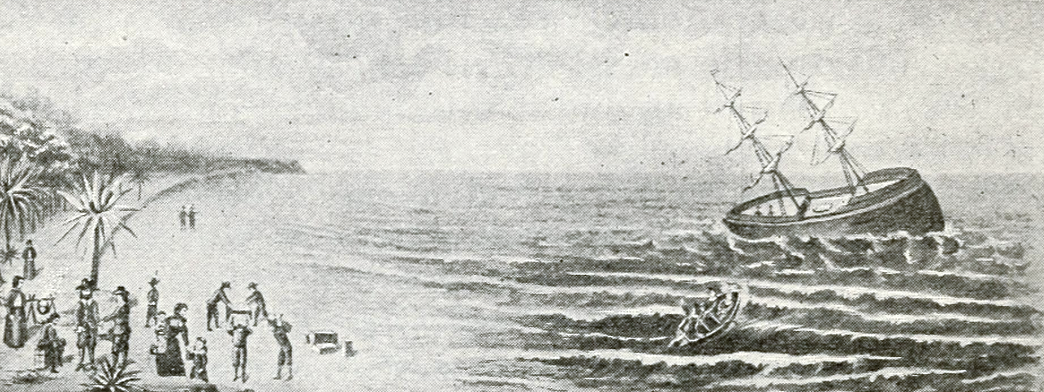
Wreck of the Sea Venture in Bermuda

Robert Rich wrote a "verse pamphlet", "Newes from Virginia: the lost flocke triumphant." (Note: Full title: "Nevves from Virginia: The lost flocke triumphant. With the happy arriuall of that famous and worthy knight Sr. Thomas Gates: and the well reputed & valiant captaine Mr. Christopher Newporte, and others, into England. With the maner of their distresse in the Iland of Deuils (otherwise called Bermoothawes) where they remayned 42. weekes, & builded two pynaces, in which they returned into Virginia. By R. Rich, Gent. one of the voyage.") Along with the writings of William Strachey and Silvester Jourdain, became well known in England by 1610, when Thomas Gates and Christopher Newport retold the saga in London. In 1865 this work was rediscovered in a Viscount Charlemont library in Ireland by Shakespeare researcher John O. Halliwell. Halliwell printed a small amount of copies for distribution.

Raised with a strong pious outlook, he and his brother (Nathaniel Rich, board member of the Somers Isles Company) were allies to the Puritans and to his cousin, Robert Rich, 2nd Earl of Warwick.

Robert Rich returned to Bermuda in 1616 or 1617, and died there in 1630.

== See also ==
- Rich family
  - Grandfather Richard Rich, 1st Baron Rich
  - Uncle Robert Rich, 1st Earl of Warwick
  - Cousin Robert Rich, 2nd Earl of Warwick
  - Brother Nathaniel Rich (merchant adventurer)
  - Nephew Nathaniel Rich (soldier)
- True Reportory
- Richneck Plantation

== Notes ==
Footnotes

Attributions

- Chisholm, Hugh, ed. (1911). "Rich, Richard" . Encyclopædia Britannica (11th ed.). Cambridge University Press.
- Harris, Charles Alexander (1896). "Rich, Nathaniel (1585?-1636)" . Dictionary of National Biography. Vol. 48. p. 119.
