= Robert Tyndall (surveyor) =

English mariner and surveyor in 1600s Virginia

Master Robert Tyndall
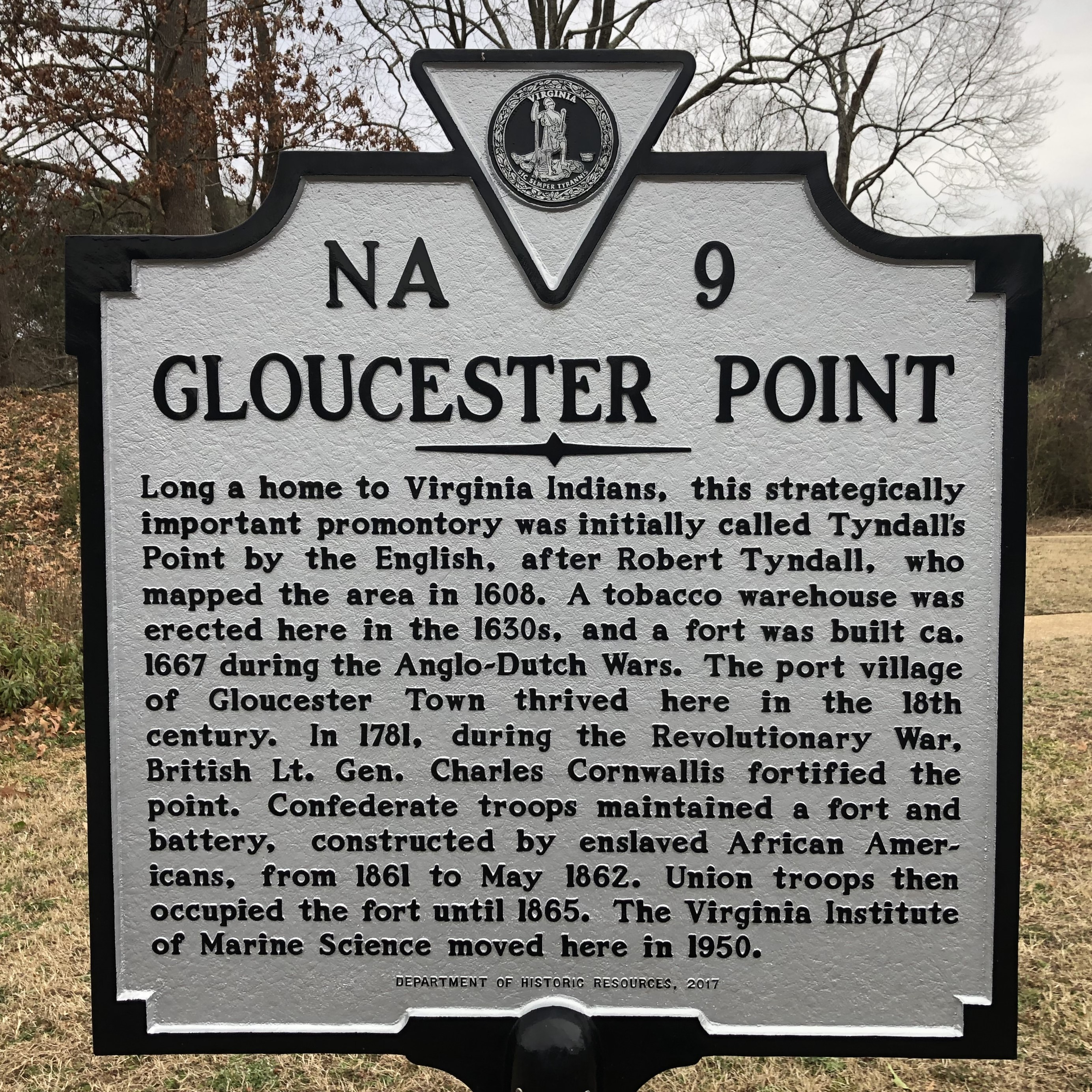
- Historical marker for Tyndall's Point, Virginia
- Other names: Robarte Tindall (Latin), "Captain Tindol" "Master Thomas Sedan" (see Identity)
- Occupations: Mariner, surveyor
- Known for: Mapping environs of Jamestown, Virginia

Robert Tyndall or Tindall (fl. 1608) was a mariner (sea captain) and a surveyor in the Colony of Virginia. He is notable for sailing to Virginia several times, and exploring the Chesapeake Bay, coastlines, and rivers with Christopher Newport, John Smith, and Samuel Argall.

== Before Virginia ==
Robert Tyndall was a mariner who traveled with the original colonists to Jamestown, Virginia, in 1607.

== Surveying Virginia ==
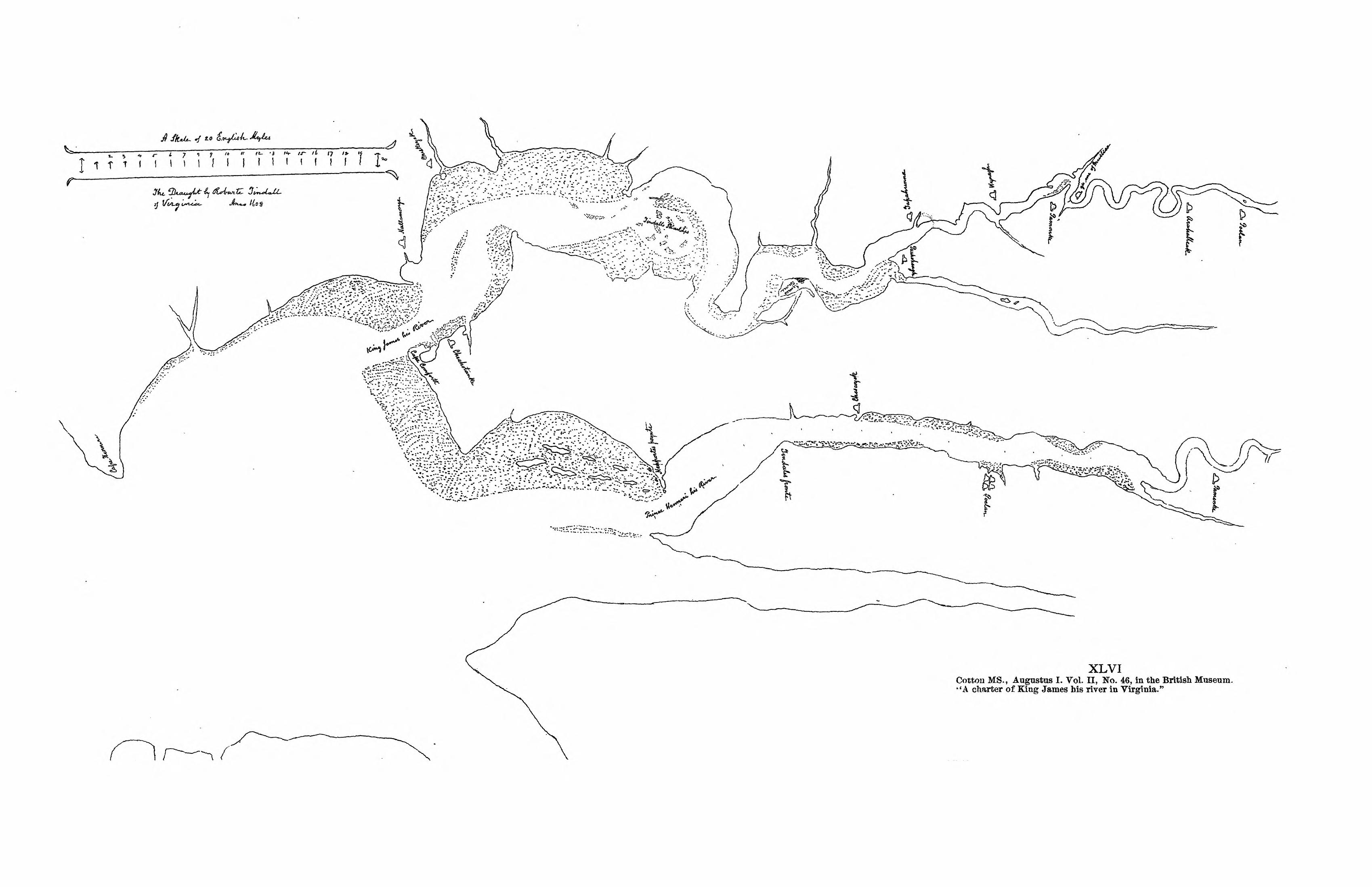
"Draughte" map of Virginia Colony's James River and York River in 1608. This is a second map produced by Tyndall.

Tyndall was part of the original Virginia Company ships that sailed from England in December, 1606, to colonise Virginia. When Captain Christopher Newport became lost in April, 1607, Tyndall used an astrolabe to navigate the ships westward to Chesapeake Bay.

In May, 1607, Robert Tyndall accompanied Christopher Newport and John Smith, aboard the Discovery in surveying of the coastline and rivers.

Near Turkey Island (James River), an unnamed native drew the English a map of the area which became the beginning of the "Tyndall draughte map". Tyndall mapped the York River during a journey to Werowocomoco with Newport in February, 1608. This map is the first of its kind by a colonist of Jamestown. Samuel Purchas and others used this map as a source for future Virginia charts.

Tyndall, employed as a surveyor for the Virginia Company of London, was called a "Gunner to Prince Henry", and wrote letters about Virginia to his sponsor, Henry Frederick, Prince of Wales. In 1608, he included a map:

"...draughte [map] of our River, hear inclosed, by us discovered..."

This map and letter were delivered to the Virginia Company of London when Captain Newport returned to England in late 1608.

Tyndall's Point (across the river from Yorktown, Virginia, now called Gloucester Point) was originally named in Robert's honour. Tyndall's Point Park still bears his name and has historical markers. "Tindall's Shoals" (on the map) is Mulberry Island area. Tyndall identifies the now-named York River as "Prince Henneri His River", and upriver is "Poetan" (Powhatan) near Purtan Bay, which is the village of Werowocomoco.

== Later adventures ==
In 1609, Tyndall, back in England, captained the Mary and John with Samuel Argall for a faster, more direct route to Virginia colony. Francisco Fernández de Écija, captain of the Spanish La Asunsión de Cristo (a small zabra, an inshore exploration vessel), was tasked with the "matter of Virginia", to gather information on the English colony's strength. In Chesapeake Bay, the Mary and John intercepted the smaller ship and prevented it from entering the James River to search for Ajacan or discover the status of Jamestown. The Mary and John returned to England by October, 1609.

Robert Tyndall and Argall again sailed with the Jamestown supply missions flotilla of Thomas West, 3rd Baron De La Warr from England, arriving at Cape Henry at the end of Starving Time, intercepting colonists abandoning the settlement. Tyndall was tasked with a fishing expedition on Virginia to help feed the starving English.

== Identity ==
Francisco Maguel, an "Irishman" who returned from Virginia to England in 1608, attributed a "Captain Tindol" in a report as being a Catholic sympathizer, but this moniker actually referred to either the deposed Councilor Edward Maria Wingfield or the mutineer Councilor George Kendall Both Kendall and Wingfield were suspected spies for the Spanish Empire—it is doubtful that Robert Tyndall (under the employ of the Prince of Wales and the Virginia Company) would be involved with Spain.

John Smith mentions in Generall Historie of Virginia that Samuel Argall sailed with a "Master Thomas Sedan", which is likely Master Robert Tyndall. There is speculation that Smith didn't want to name a rival cartographer.

== See also ==
- Captain John Smith Chesapeake National Historic Trail
