= Michael Sicklemore =

English gentleman, colonist, soldier and explorer (c. 1570s-1609)

Lieutenant Michael Sicklemore
- Born: c. 1570s
- Died: Autumn 1609; Nansemond River, Virginia
- Other names: Michaell, Michell Sicklemore
- Occupations: Adventurer, army officer

Michael Sicklemore (born c. 1570s, died 1609) was an English gentleman, soldier, and explorer. He was a colonist with the Jamestown first supply and led an unsuccessful expedition to find traces of Walter Raleigh's lost Roanoke Colony.

== Biography ==
In October 1607, Sicklemore left England for the Colony of Virginia. He was a colonist with the first supply and a lieutenant in the Army. From June through September 1608, Sicklemore was one of the selected crew members on captain John Smith's assembled shallop Discovery Barge on its two expeditions throughout the Chesapeake Bay.

In late 1608, he was asked by captain John Smith to lead an unsuccessful expedition to find traces of Walter Raleigh's "Lost Colony" at Roanoke Island, south into the Chowanoc country. He was accompanied by Warraskoyack tribal guides during his expedition.

In 1609, Sicklemore was deputized by captain John Martin to take charge at the Nansemond settlement in his absence during the Anglo-Powhatan Wars. Some time after September, Sicklemore went on an expedition from the settlement in an attempt to trade for food. He was found dead within a few days' time.
