= Robert Beheathland =

Early English colonist of Virginia

Captain Robert Beheathland
- Born: before 1587; St Endellion, Cornwall, Kingdom of England
- Died: 1627 (aged 40–41) unknown
- Other name: Behethland
- Occupations: Sea captain, adventurer
- Known for: Original Jamestown colonist with documented descendants
- Spouse: Mary (see Family)
- Children: Dorothy, Mary, John

Captain Robert Beheathland (or Behethland, born before 1587 - d. 1627) in St Endellion, Cornwall, England, was an English gentleman who arrived in Jamestown, Virginia, in 1607 aboard one of the three founding ships, likely the Susan Constant. He is noteworthy as the only original 1607 Jamestown colonist having documented descendants (Dade family and Powell family) living today.

== Documented presence ==
Capt. Beheathland is listed among the 104 colonists on the Virginia Company of London's manifest. He is included in Captain John Smith's list of 100 "Planters" (gentlemen) in his book The Generall Historie of Virginia, New-England, and the Summer Isles, and mentioned as accompanying John Smith on a visit to Powhatan, the local indigenous leader.

== Possible roles and significance ==
Early colonist: His presence in 1607 makes him one of the first permanent English settlers in North America. Social standing: "Gentleman" status suggests he belonged to a wealthier class and may have contributed financially or provided leadership in the settlement's early days. Trade potential: Some sources suggest he brought sheet copper to trade with Indigenous people.

== Interaction with John Smith, Christopher Newport, and Opechancanough ==
In Jan 1608, after arrival of the First Supply, captains Smith and Christopher Newport took a group of about twenty men, one of them Robert Beheathland, and went to the village of Powhatan for a visit. Later in the year, on 29 December 1608, Capt. Smith undertook a journey up the Pamunkey River for another visit with Powhatan. Robert Beheathland traveled in the Discovery barge with Capt. Smith; other gentlemen, soldiers, and sailors followed in a pinnace.

On the way back, they stopped at the house of Mamanatowick, Opechancanough; Capt. Smith took with him a group of about fifteen, including Beheathland. When they were threatened with capture, Powell and Beheathland guarded the door while Capt. Smith seized the King by the long lock of his hair and held him hostage as they escaped.

== Land acquisition ==
Robert was an Ancient Planter, and thus received 100 acres of land for being present before the arrival of Sir Thomas Dale.

== Later life and family ==
Robert married a woman named Mary, whose surname is unknown, and had at least three children; there are claims that his wife was Mary Nicholson, but there is no documentation to support this. Following his death, his widow Mary married second lieutenant Thomas Flint of Warwick County, when her name appeared in court records in regard to land she had inherited.

The three Documented children of Robert are:

1. Dorothy, born in England or Virginia in 1612 or 1613. In November 1628, she is listed in Virginia court records as the step-daughter of Lt Thomas Flint living in Elizabeth City.
2. Mary, born in 1614 or 1615. About 1631 she married Captain Thomas Bernard of Warwick County. They had a daughter named Beheathland Bernard, who married first to Francis Dade (alias Major John Smith), and married second to Major Andrew Gilson.
3. John, born in 1616 or 1617. He wrote his will in 1636 saying he was on the way to Virginia and the administration of his estate was granted in October 1639 to his cousin Charles Beheathland, who stated "John and died abroad, unmarried."

Robert's brother Anthony died in May 1615. Robert and his brother George sued Anthony's widow Ursula for their interests in the estate. In 1618, the judge ordered the widow to pay 80 pounds divided among Anthony's relatives. By 1620, Robert was in England, petitioning the Royal Council of England for a qualified governor for Virginia. Robert died in 1627.

== Legacy ==
Robert Beheathland is significant for being one of the founding figures of Jamestown and contributing to the establishment of the first successful English colony in North America. He also is notable for having descendants living today, possibly the only one of the original 1607 colonists with that distinction. This makes him a historical link to the founding of America.

== Sources ==
- Dorman, John Frederick; Meyer, Virginia M. (1987). Adventurers of Purse and Person 1607-1624/5 (3rd ed.). Richmond, VA: The Dietz Press. OCLC 19270461.
- Gray, Violet Noland (1978). Genealogical History of Robert Beheathland. Baltimore, MD: Gateway Press. OCLC 4037270.
- Smith, John (2006) [1624, Michael Sparkes, London]. Names of the First Planters, The Generall Historie of Virginia. University of North Carolina at Chapel Hill.
