= Matthew Scrivener =

English colonist in Virginia

Lieutenant Matthew Scrivener
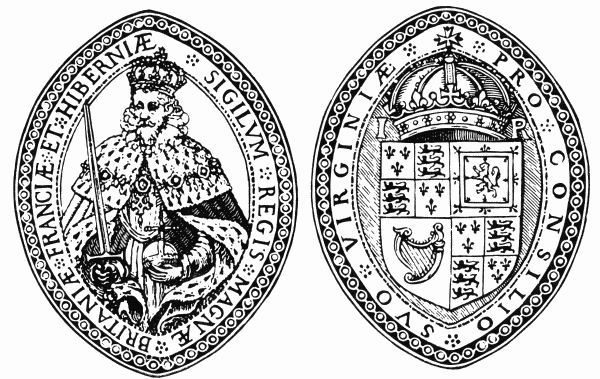
- Seal of Virginia Governor's Council
- Born: c. 1580; Suffolk, England
- Died: January 7, 1609/10 (O.S./N.S.); James River, Virginia
- Cause of death: Accidental drowning
- Other names: Mathew Scrivenor [sic], Master Scrivner [sic], Screvener, Captain Scrivener
- Occupation: Secretary (title)

President of the Virginia Governor's Council
- In office 1608–1608

Lt. Matthew Scrivener (bap. 1580/1 – d. 1609) was an English colonist in Virginia. He served briefly as acting governor of Jamestown, and was succeeded by Captain John Smith. He died by drowning in the James River.

== Life ==
Scrivener was the son of Ralph (or Rauff) Scrivener of Ipswich and of Belstead, in Suffolk, England, a barrister and city bailiff. Scrivener most likely hailed from Coddenham, where his family had a manor. Matthew was baptized into the Church of England at St Nicholas' Church, Ipswich, on March 3, 1580/81 (O.S./N.S.). The Scrivener family was familiar with Bartholomew Gosnold, who had traveled to Virginia with the original colonist ships in 1607. Before departing England, Scrivener was appointed by the Virginia Company of London as a council member to assist the new colony. and arrived in Virginia in 1608 on a first supply ship. Listed as "Matthew Scrivener, gentleman" in early Virginia records, his sister was married to the cousin of the first President of the Council of Jamestown, Edward Maria Wingfield.

=== President of the Governor's Council ===
Scrivener was an ally of Councilor John Smith. When John Ratcliffe was "ousted" (or pressured to leave) by Smith and Scrivener in July 1608, Scrivener acted as a president of the Governor's Council until September 1608. Smith was elected president ("chief counselor") in September, Scrivener stayed as a Councilor and secretary. When John Smith was absent on river explorations, Scrivener acted as president.

== Death ==
In January 1609/10 (O.S./N.S.), Scrivener and ten men (including at least four Council members) took a skiff to hunt along the James River. Near Hog Island a storm capsized the boat, dumping all into the cold river. As most English could not swim at the time, Scrivener and eight other colonists drowned, half of them members of the governing Council, including Bartholomew Gosnold's brother, Anthony.

A year after Scrivener's death by drowning, his brother John Scrivener in England purchased Sibton Abbey in Suffolk, where Scrivener family descendants still live today.

Government offices
Preceded by John Ratcliffe	Colonial Governor of Virginia; 1608–1609	Succeeded by John Smith
