= Jonas Profit =

English mariner and explorer

Jonas Profit (born c. 1590s, died after 1610) was an English mariner and explorer. He was a colonist with the Jamestown first supply and an early fisherman and fishmonger in the Colony of Virginia.

== Biography ==
In May 1607, Profit left England for the Colony of Virginia as a colonist with the first supply. From June through September 1608, Profit was a crew member and the designated "fisherman/sailor" on captain John Smith's boat Discovery Barge on its two expeditions throughout the Chesapeake Bay. He has also been described as a "soldier" in the writings of Smith. During the July 1608 expedition, Profit was put in charge of the pinnace as "master."

Profit worked as a fishmonger in the Jamestown region. Seafood he likely caught/harvested (through nest-less fishing) and sold included speckled trout, Atlantic croakers, Norfolk spot, flounder, oysters, blue crabs, and rockfish.

=== Legacy ===
The road Jonas Profit Trail in Jamestown is named for Profit, located near the beach and marina.

Profit is a central character in the 1957 symphonic drama The Founders by Paul Green.

The 2006 book The Weight of Smoke: A Novel of the Jamestown Colony by George Robert Minkoff is written from the perspective of Profit. The fictionalized version of Profit in the book had accompanied Sir Francis Drake on his voyages in the Caribbean.
