= Nicholas Scot =

Virginia colonial person and musician

Nicholas Scot (sometimes spelled Nicholas Skot) was an English-born early American settler to the Jamestown Colony. Scot was one of the first musicians to arrive to an English colony in the New World.

== Biography ==
Scot was born in England (likely near the Huntingdonshire region) in the late 16th century. He was contracted by the Virginia Company to join their expedition and sailed from London in December 1606 as one of the original colonists bound for Virginia. On May 14 1607, Scot was one of the early settlers to arrive to Jamestown. He was listed as a "drummer" as his occupation on the ship's manifest. As the first drummer in the colony, Scot played an important role in the day-to-day military signaling and schedule-keeping of the colony, providing cadence for work parties, signaling muster calls, and maintaining order during the colony's first difficult months.

Scot is recorded as one of the first musicians to arrive to an English colony in the New World.

== In popular culture ==
Scot is a character in various works of historical fiction, including James Otis Kaler's 1910 Richard of Jamestown and Elizabeth Massie's 1609: Winter of the Dead. He was also referenced in Stephen Vincent Benét's posthumous 1943 work, Western Star.
