= Matthew Somers =

English mariner

Matthew Somers (fl. 1609 – c. 1624) was an English mariner, captain, and shareholder in the Virginia Company of London who played a small but pivotal role in the early history of Bermuda and the Jamestown colony. A nephew of Admiral Sir George Somers, founder of Bermuda, Matthew commanded vessels in the company’s Third Supply, helped ferry the starving survivors of Jamestown back from the brink of collapse, and controversially repatriated his uncle’s embalmed body to Lyme Regis, Dorset, in 1611.

== Family and early life ==
Almost nothing certain is known of Somers’s birth, but contemporary writers agree he was raised alongside his elder brother in Lyme Regis, Dorset, in the household of his child-less uncle George and aunt Joan Heywood Somers. As a teenager, he was convicted and fined for drawing blood during a public brawl.

== Service with the Virginia Company ==
By 1609 the Virginia Company had secured a broader charter and was recruiting aggressively. Somers sailed that June as master of the pinnace Swallow, one of nine vessels in the Third Supply under his uncle's command. When the flagship Sea Venture wrecked on Bermuda during a hurricane, the survivors - including Matthew - spent nine months building two cedar vessels, Deliverance and Patience.

In May 1610 the two makeshift ships reached Virginia, where only about sixty of the original 500 colonists remained alive after the "Starving Time." Admiral Somers and Governor Sir Thomas Gates evacuated the fort, but at the mouth of the James River met Lord De la Warr’s relief fleet and turned back.

To ease the renewed food crisis, George Somers volunteered to return to Bermuda for live hogs, fish, and sweet potatoes. He sailed on Patience with his nephew Matthew as captain on June 19, 1610, while Samuel Argall fished in the Chesapeake. Sir George reached Bermuda but died on November 9, 1610. Matthew buried the admiral’s heart and entrails at what is now Somers Garden, St George’s, preserved the rest of the body in alcohol, and sailed Patience directly to Lyme Regis rather than back to Virginia. The corpse was re-interred with military honors at Whitchurch Canonicorum on June 4, 1611. Somers' abrupt departure left three sailors behind to maintain England’s claim to Bermuda but angered Jamestown officials who still needed supplies.

On arriving in England, Somers briefed the Virginia Company, recounting Bermuda’s abundant resources - "pearls and ambergris and whale-oil," which helped persuade investors to spin off a separate Somers Isles Company in 1612.

== Later life and death ==
Following his return to England, Matthew Somers joined the East India Company for a time. A 1614 death notice for another sailor lists him as a captain, suggesting his continued maritime career. Somers engaged in a lengthy legal battle with his aunt and elder brother regarding his uncle's estate, to which he believed he was entitled. Despite his efforts, Somers was unsuccessful in any attempt to be the principal heir of his uncle's estate, which went to his elder brother Nicholas in its entirety.

In 1620, Somers appeared before the Virginia Company court, claiming that his uncle Sir George had invested £1,100 in the colony and requesting repayment. Upon review, company records indicated the actual investment was only £470. The Company, which did not offer refunds, instead proposed awarding Somers with land in Virginia as a dividend. A few months later, Somers proposed to transport 100 settlers to Virginia and requested £200 in advance, citing "the personal worth and merit of Sir George Somers." His effort to leverage his uncle’s legacy was rejected and viewed with skepticism. From that point on, the Virginia Company began referring to him as Sir George’s “pretended” heir.

By 1622, Somers had fallen into debt and was imprisoned. From debtors' prison, he submitted a petition to King James I, accusing the Virginia Company of "injustice and oppression" and seeking royal compensation for what he described as his uncle’s "discovery" of Bermuda. He portrayed Carter, Waters, and Chard—who had discovered a large quantity of ambergris—as agents of Sir George, and requested a share of the find, which he valued at £12,000. The Virginia Company countered that Sir George had been in their employ at the time of the discovery, and thus any findings were the property of the investors. Despite the Company’s rebuttal, Somers' narrative influenced later accounts. Nathaniel Butler, in his historical writings, appears to have accepted Somers’ version of events, shaping how Sir George's legacy was interpreted.

The last known record of Matthew Somers dates to February 1624. Still imprisoned, he petitioned for half of the £470 investment the Company acknowledged. However, the Company asserted that the rightful heir was Nicholas Somers, two years older than Matthew, who inherited the claim under the rules of primogeniture. Ultimately, Matthew received nothing.

=== Legacy ===
The shipwreck of the Sea Venture which Somers was aboard is considered to be a potential inspiration for William Shakespeare's 1610 play, The Tempest.

Although various pamphleteers called him "greedy" for securing his inheritance ahead of Jamestown’s needs, modern historians view Matthew Somers as a minor but essential link between Bermuda and Virginia. His decision to bring his uncle home ensured the admiral’s public funeral, kept the Somers name prominent in West-Country politics, and, by accident or design, galvanized fresh investment that stabilized both colonies.
