= John Ratcliffe (governor) =

Colonial governor of Virginia

Captain John Ratcliffe
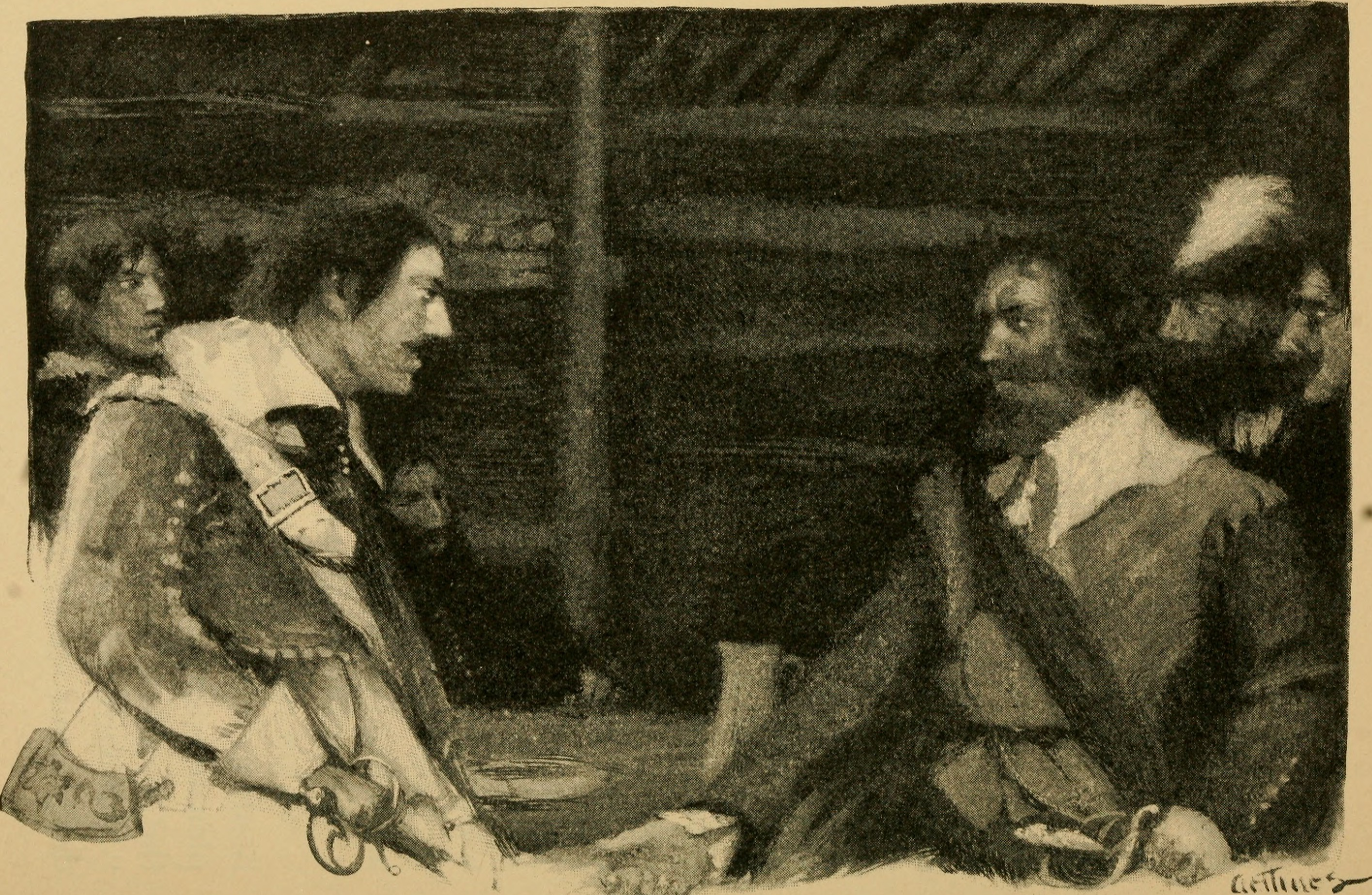
- Depiction of Ratcliffe (left) and John Smith
- Born: John Sicklemore; May 1549; Lancashire, England
- Died: c. December 1609 (aged 60); Orapax, Virginia Colony
- Cause of death: Execution by Native Americans
- Other names: Rattliefe [sic], John Radcliff, Radclif
- Occupations: Sea captain, Adventurer
- Spouse: Dorothy Ratcliffe

John Ratcliffe (born John Sicklemore; b. 1549 – d. 1609) was an early Jamestown, Virginia settler and sea captain. Ratcliffe was an original member of the Virginia Governor's Council and became acting president (or governor) before his death. He was tortured to death by the Pamunkey people in the winter of 1609–1610.

== Early life ==
John Sicklemore was born in Lancashire. In early life, he changed his name to "Ratcliffe" as an alias.

He served as a seaman before going to Virginia, and he may be the Captain Ratcliffe taken prisoner with Sir Henry Cary, 1st Viscount Falkland and Captain Piggot, at Mülheim, in 1605.

== Voyage to Virginia ==
Ratcliffe commanded the 20-ton pinnace Discovery on the voyage to Jamestown, and was named to the colonial council when the sealed orders were opened in Virginia. Discovery was the smallest of the three ships and carried 21 people. The fleet left London on 20 December 1606, anchored in the Downs on 5 January, and was kept there for some time by contrary winds and storms. During the voyage, Smith recorded that Ratcliffe urged turning back to England after the ships had sailed three days beyond their expected position without sighting land. Instead, an overnight storm drove the fleet to the Virginia coast. The expedition sighted Virginia on 26 April 1607 and reached the future Jamestown site on 13 May, with the colonists landing the following day to begin fortifying the settlement.

== Jamestown council and presidency ==
Ratcliffe was one of the councillors named in the Virginia Company's sealed instructions, which were opened after the expedition reached Virginia. During the colony's first summer, disputes arose within the council over provisions. Wingfield attributed the conflict partly to demands by councillors for larger allowances for themselves and certain sick men, which he said he refused without their warrant because he believed it would endanger the colony's food supply. According to Wingfield, members of the council then plotted to depose him and make Ratcliffe the next president. On 10 September 1607, Ratcliffe, John Smith, and John Martin came to Wingfield's tent with a warrant to remove him. Wingfield subsequently referred to Ratcliffe as the "new President".

Ratcliffe fell out of favour with many colonists after enlisting men to build a governor's house. Many colonists also disagreed with how he handled trade with the natives and how he performed during the food shortages during the summer of 1608. Ratcliffe was removed in July 1608 and succeeded by Matthew Scrivener. During the administration of George Percy, Ratcliffe was sent in October 1609 to build a fort at Old Point Comfort, which was named Algenourne Fort after one of Percy's ancestors. Ratcliffe had been sick in the first summer of Jamestown, and never recovered to the change of climate.

Ratcliffe worked with explorer John Smith to remove Edward Wingfield from the presidency because he was hiding food for himself that the colony needed. Ratcliffe was elected president and asked Smith to organise work details and expeditions to trade with Native Americans. By January 1608, only 38 colonists were alive, and Ratcliffe and the council planned to return to England on Discovery. Ratcliffe's overgenerous trading provoked Smith to complain that they would soon run out of items to trade. Ratcliffe left office (either by resignation or deposition) in July 1608, two months before the end of his term. The colonists were also enraged that as they were sick and dying, Ratcliffe ordered they build a capitol in the woods. The colonists dubbed the project "Ratcliffe's Palace."

== Return to England and Third Supply ==
Ratcliffe accompanied Christopher Newport when he sailed from Virginia in 1608. In May 1609, he commanded Diamond, one of the ships in the Third Supply fleet of Sir Thomas Gates.

== Death ==
During the Starving Time in December 1609 (or early 1610), Ratcliffe and 25 fellow colonists were invited to a gathering with a group of Powhatan Indians. They had been promised they would receive corn by way of trade, but it was a trap; the Powhatans ambushed and killed them, and Ratcliffe was taken to the village. He was tied to a stake in front of a fire and flayed by women of the tribe with mussel shells, with pieces of his skin tossed into the flames as he watched. The account of his death was relayed by the surviving Captain William Phettiplace, and recorded by George Percy.

Butt haveinge noe expectacyon of Reliefe to Come in so shorte a Tyme I sentt Capteyne Ratliefe to Powhatan to p[ro]cure victewalls and corne by the way of comerce and trade the w[hi]ch the Subtell owlde foxe att firste made good semblanse of althoughe his intente was otherwayes onely wayteinge a fitteinge tyme for their destruction as after plainely appered. The w[hi]ch was p[ar]tly ocasyoned by Capt[eyn]e Ratliefes Creduletie for Haveinge Powhatans sonne and dowghter aboard his pinesse freely suffred them to dep[ar]te ageine on shoare, whome if he had deteyned mighte have bene a Sufficyentt pledge for his saffety. And after, nott kepeinge a p[ro]per and fitteinge Courte of guarde, butt Suffreinge his men by towe and thre and small numbers in a Company to straggle into the Salvages howses when the slye owlde kinge espyed a fitteinge Tyme Cutt them all of, onely Surprysed Capt[eyn]e Ratliefe alyve who he caused to be bownd unto a tree naked w[i]th a fyer before, and by woemen his fleshe was skraped from his bones w[i]th Mussell shelles and before his face throwne into the fyer. And so for wantt of Circumspection miserably p[er]ished.

— George Percy, "A Trewe Relacyon" [sic]

As a consequence of his misfortune, he was referred to as the "Luckless and Ill-fated Captain Ratcliffe".

== In popular culture ==
Ratcliffe is the main antagonist of Disney's Pocahontas (1995), portrayed as a greedy and ruthlessly ambitious man who believes that the Powhatan tribe is very barbaric and has hidden gold near the outskirts of Virginia. He wants to battle the Native Americans for it, despite the fact that there was no gold discovered in colonial Virginia. Here, he was voiced by David Ogden Stiers, who gave him a very British-influenced Mid-Atlantic accent. In this adaptation, he is accompanied by his pug Percy (this name is derived from the English colonist George Percy) and by his servant Wiggins (also voiced by Stiers). Unlike the real events, he also appeared in the direct-to-video sequel Pocahontas II: Journey to a New World (1998), where he plans to dupe King James I into allowing him to send a large navy armada to perpetrate a genocide against the Powhatans by attempting to sabotage the diplomatic meetings between Pocahontas and the king. He is finally arrested and exposed for his crimes of incompetence and treachery and is imprisoned by King James.

== Sources ==
- Jamestown – Historyisfun.org
- Beaufort County Court House, Washington, NC, Public Records, Log of Transactions
- Cook, Minnie G. (1941). "The Susan Constant and the Mayflower". The William and Mary Quarterly. Second Series. 21 (3): 229–233. JSTOR 1925278.
- Raymond F. Dolle, "Captain John Smith's Satire of Sir Walter Raleigh"
- David Morenus, "The Real Pocahontas"
- "Virginia Records Timeline: 1553–1743", United States Library of Congress Thomas Jefferson Papers
- Price, David A., Love and Hate in Jamestown: John Smith, Pocahontas, and the Start of a New Nation (New York: Knopf, 2003)
- Property Records from Beaufort County Courthouse, North Carolina
- The Jamestown Adventure: Accounts of the Virginia Colony, 1605–1614 (Real Voices, Real History) by Ed Southern (Editor) (Winston-Salem NC: Blair, 2004)
- Percy, George (1946). "Observations by Master George Percy, 1607". In Tyler, Lyon Gardiner (ed.). Narratives of Early Virginia, 1606–1625. Original Narratives of Early American History. New York: Barnes & Noble. pp. 5–23.
- George Percy, "A Trewe Relacyon of the procedeings and ocurrentes of Momente which have hapned in Virginia"
- Smith, John (1624). The Generall Historie of Virginia, New-England, and the Summer Isles. London: Printed by I. D. and I. H. for Michael Sparkes.
- Wingfield, Edward Maria (1860) [1608]. Deane, Charles (ed.). A Discourse of Virginia. Boston: Privately printed [J. Wilson and Son].

Government offices
Preceded by Edward Maria Wingfield	Colonial Governor of Virginia; 1608	Succeeded by Matthew Scrivener
