= Thomas Wotton (surgeon) =

Early surgeon in the Virginia colony

- Born: fl. 1585; Kingdom of England
- Other names: Wooten, Wootton
- Occupation: Surgeon
- Known for: Original colonist in Jamestown, Virginia

Thomas Wotton was a surgeon who traveled to Jamestown, Virginia in 1607 with the original group of colonists. Another surgeon, Will Wilkinson, also was among the first colonists. Wotton was described as a "gentleman" while Wilkinson was identified with the laborers and craftsmen. During the 17th century, the term "surgeon" was not considered a doctor, but Wotton and others were treated as physicians in the English colonial frontier.

Captain John Smith praised Thomas Wotton for his treatment of the sick. Edward Maria Wingfield, when council president, on the other hand, criticized Wotton for staying aboard the pinnace, Discovery, treating the sick. Wingfield would not provide funds to purchase drugs and other necessities because of his view of Wotton's slothfulness.

Captain Christopher Newport who brought the first settlers from England took Thomas Wotton on his journey up the James River on the Susan Constant to the falls at Richmond, Virginia before he returned to England for supplies. Wotton stayed to help care for the colonists.

In a compilation of abstracts of English wills from the 17th century, the compiler notes that "Thomas Wotton, barber and surgeon", whose will was dated March 15, 1635 and proved April 28, 1638, may have been the same Thomas Wotton who accompanied the first settlers to Jamestown.
