= Silvester Jourdain =

British adventurer and author

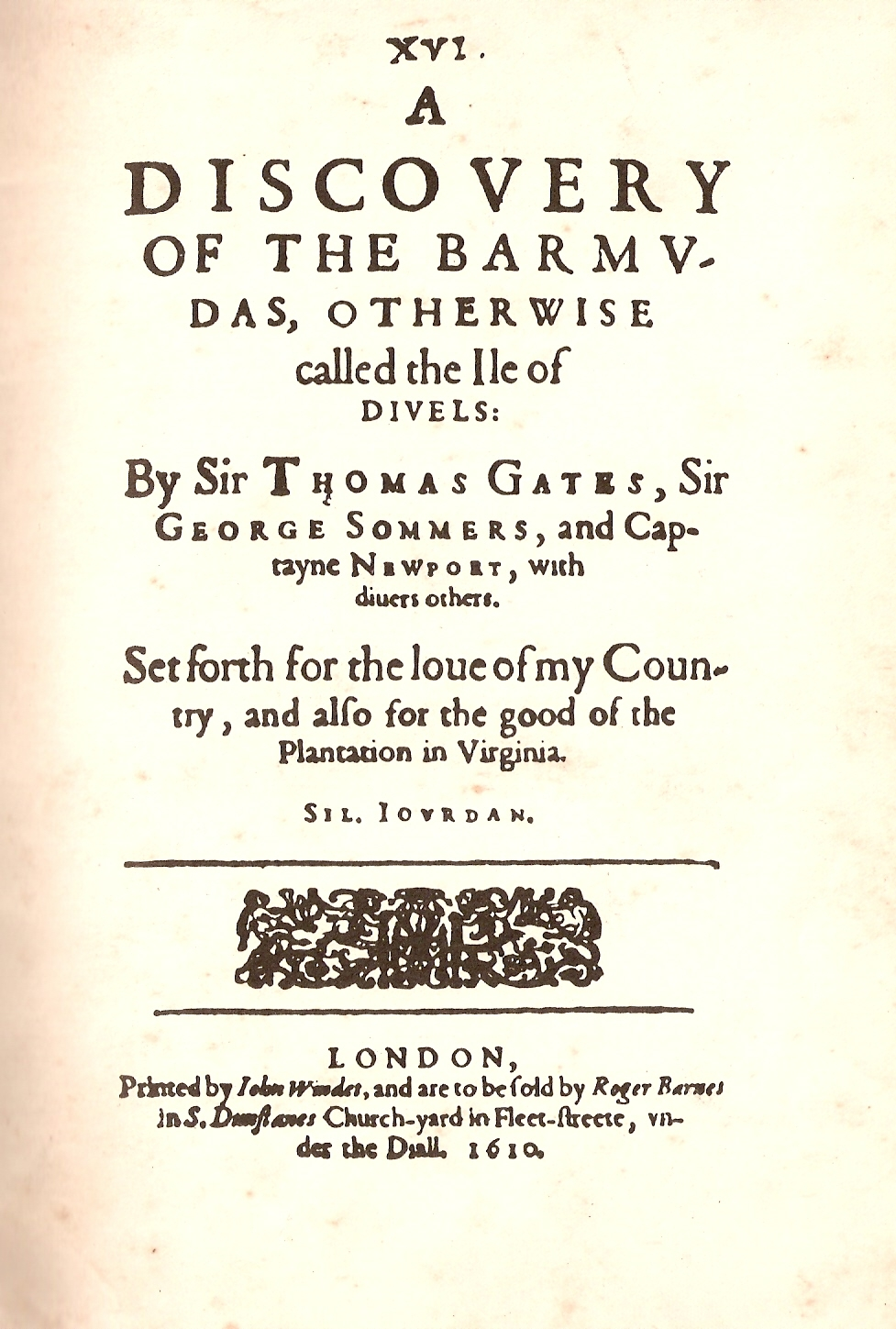
- A Discovery of the Barmvdas, otherwise called the Ile of Divels (1610)
- Born: fl. 1600
- Died: spring 1650; St Sepulchre, London, England
- Other names: Sylvester Jordain, Silvestre Jourdain, Sylvester Jourdan
- Occupations: Adventurer, chronicler
- Notable work: A Discovery of the Barmvdas, otherwise called the Ile of Divels (1610), A Plaine Description of the Barmvdas, now called Sommer Ilands, etc. (1613)

Silvester Jourdain (fl. 1600 - d. 1650), was an English traveler who became a colonist at the Jamestown, Virginia settlement. During the journey in 1609, a tropical storm caused the ship, the Sea Venture to be run aground on the uninhabited St. George's Island, Bermuda, with Jourdain, George Somers, Thomas Gates, William Strachey, and other settlers marooned for nine months.

Silvester Jourdain was old enough in 1603 to ship goods from Lyme Regis, Dorset.

Silvester authored a pamphlet in 1610, A Discovery of the Barmvdas, otherwise called the Ile of Divels [sic] (later part of the 1613 publication, A Plaine Description of the Barmvdas, now called Sommer Ilands, etc. (Note: Full title: A Plaine Description of the Barmvdas, now called Sommer Ilands. With the manner of their discouerie Anno 1609. by the shipwreck and admirable deliuerance of Sir Thomas Gates, and Sir George Somers, wherein are truly set forth the commodities and profits of that Rich, Pleasant, and Healthfull Covntrie. With An Addition, or ample relation of diuers other remarkeable matters concerning those Ilands since then experienced, lately sent from thence by one of the Colonie now there resident.)), which scholars have attributed as inspiration for William Shakespeare's The Tempest.

Silvester died unmarried in the parish of St Sepulchre, in the spring of 1650. He was the son of William Jourdain of Lyme Regis, a brother to merchant Ignatius Jourdain of Exeter, and a cousin of John Jourdain.

== See also ==
- True Reportory

== Notes ==
=== References ===
Attribution

- This article incorporates text from a publication now in the public domain: "Jourdain, Silvester". Dictionary of National Biography. London: Smith, Elder & Co. 1885–1900.
