= Gabriel Archer =

English explorer of Chesapeake Bay and Cape Cod

Captain Gabriel Archer
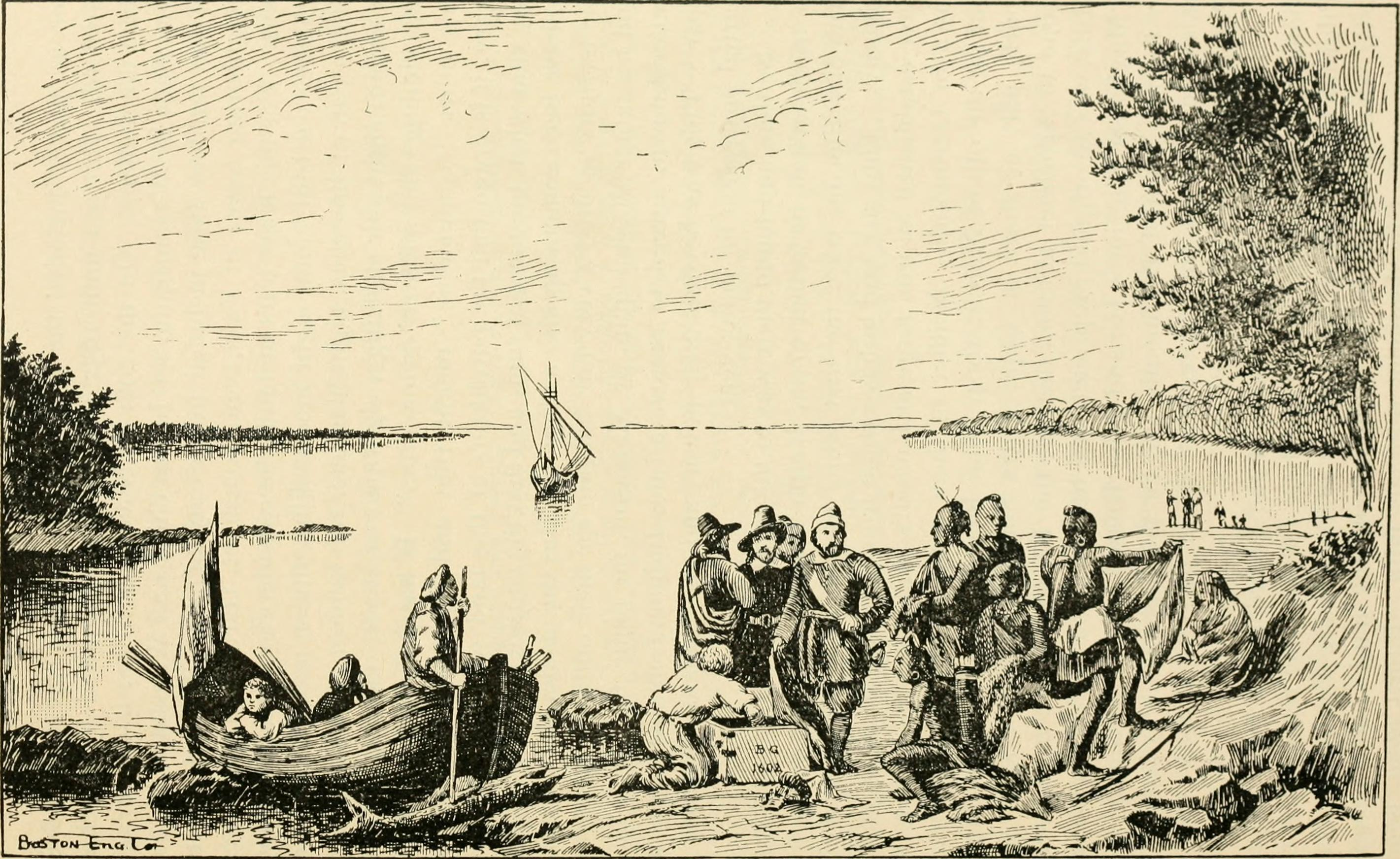
- Archer, Gosnold, crew, and natives in New Beford, 1602
- Born: b. c. 1574; Mountnessing, Essex, Kingdom of England
- Died: d. c. 1610 (aged 34-36); Jamestown, Colony of Virginia
- Occupations: Explorer, chronicler, lawyer
- Known for: Cape Cod exploration (1602), Original colonist to Jamestown (1607)
- Notable work: "The Relation of Captaine Gosnols Voyage to the North Part of Virginia" (1625)

Gabriel Archer was an early English explorer of Cape Cod, Chesapeake Bay, and Virginia. A settler of Jamestown, Virginia, he clashed with the leadership council and John Smith repeatedly before dying in the winter of 1609-1610. The Jamestown Rediscovery Project, among other scholars, considers the possibility that Gabriel Archer may have been a Catholic, based on how he was buried.

== Early life ==
Gabriel Archer was born to Christopher and Mary Archer of Mountnessing, Essex in England, in either 1574 or 1575. He graduated from St John's College, Cambridge in 1591.

== Cape Cod ==
Gabriel Archer also explored Cape Cod under an expedition which was headed by Bartholomew Gosnold. His account of this expedition was later published after his death by Samuel Purchas under the title "The Relation of Captaine Gosnols Voyage to the North Part of Virginia." The title reflects the fact that the term New England was not consistently used to refer to Massachusetts and its environs at that time.

The voyage departed on March 26, 1602, before arriving at the coast on May 14. The expedition consequently explored both Cape Cod, but also Martha's Vineyard, which George R. Stewart conjectures that Archer himself named, as Gosnold had a daughter named Martha and there were many grapevines in the area. Martha's Vineyard initially designated a smaller island, before the name was shifted to the larger island referred to as Martha's Vineyard to this day. Archer also recorded and most likely coined many other names from that voyage that are not still used in the present day, including Tucker's Terror and Hill's Hap. His records contain a description of most of the important events of the voyage, including finding and naming Cape Cod.

During the course of the expedition, Archer engaged in trade with the local Wampanoag tribe and helped build a trading post at Cuttyhunk Island. However, the trading post was abandoned when Archer and the rest of the expedition returned to England.

== Jamestown ==
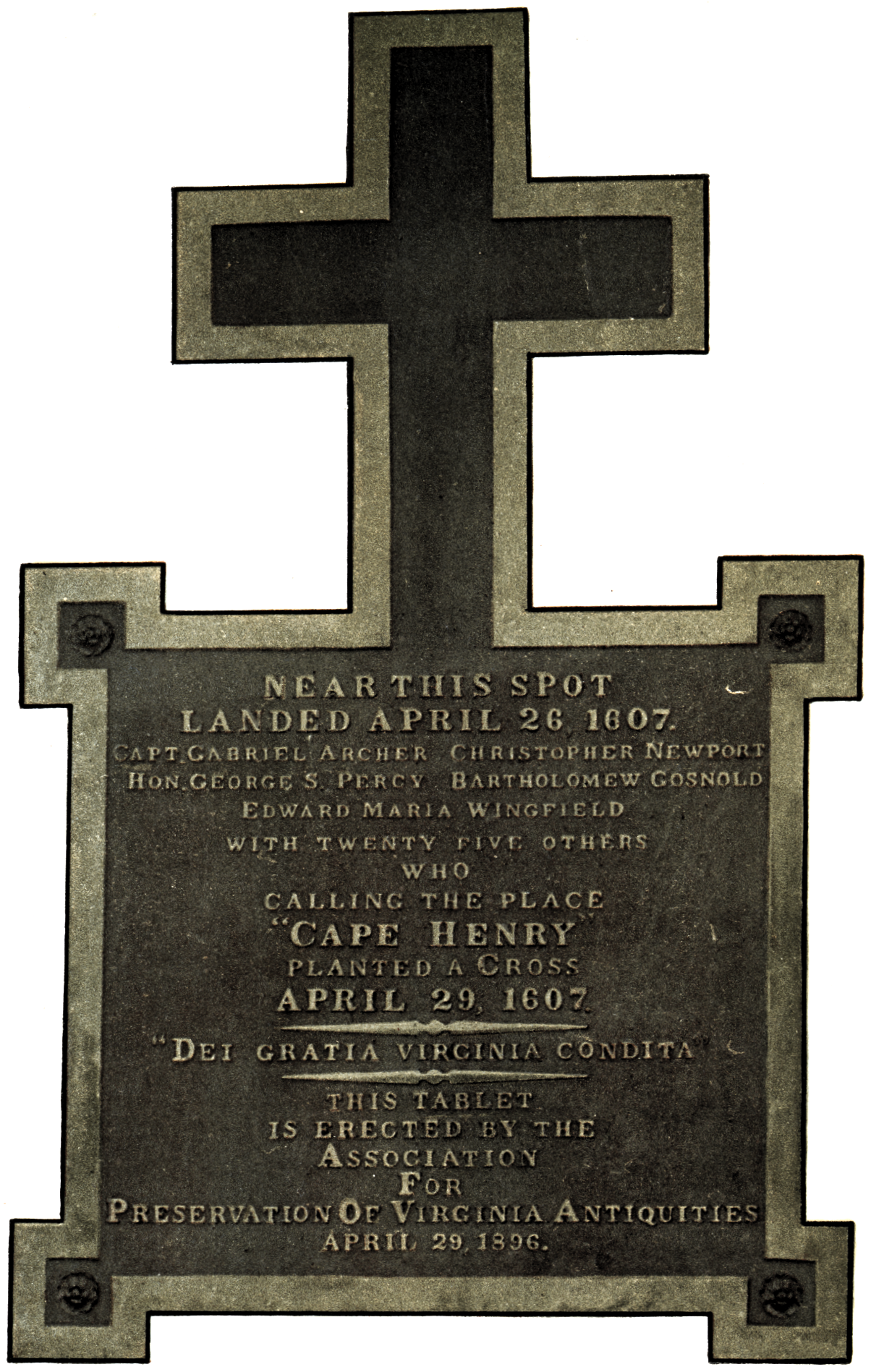
Tablet on Lighthouse, Cape Henry, VA

Archer entered Chesapeake Bay in an expedition in early 1607 to aid in setting up the Virginia colony. On April 26, some of the local Native Americans attacked, and Archer sustained some wounds to his hands. Later on, in the James River, Archer sighted what he thought to be a promising site for settlement, which afterwards was known as Archer's Hope (near College Creek). However, a separate site which Christopher Newport preferred was picked, which ended up becoming Jamestown. Newport then led an expedition that charted the James River until present-day Richmond, Virginia. While on that journey, Archer most likely kept a log of what they saw, and bestowed more names upon the land, though many were changed and few survived.

Archer then gained a position as secretary and recorder for Jamestown. However, he was not on the governing council at that time, despite his position. Archer then aided in the trial of Edward Maria Wingfield, the first president of the colony, who was convicted for a string of minor charges after a shift in opinion against him because of a lack of food and great disease within the colony.

Not long after the trial, John Smith had been captured by the Powhatan tribe. Smith was released, but two of his men had been killed on that mission. Archer held Smith responsible and subsequently put him on trial. Archer called for the death penalty, citing Leviticus in support of why Smith should be hanged. However, Smith was not hanged, because Christopher Newport arrived with supplies that he had brought back from England, and convinced the colonists to let Smith go free.

Archer then accompanied Newport on his voyage back to England, along with his enemy Wingfield. In England, Archer reported to the Virginia Company about Jamestown, including by recommending the possibility of growing sugar there, or pineapples, though he did also mention the possibility of profitably exporting tobacco. Archer's return, however, was a tempestuous voyage, including a hurricane that severely damaged the Blessing, the ship that he was on, and left some of the other ships broken or stranded.

When Archer returned, Smith was president of Jamestown. The ships that were returning from England were supposed to convey that Thomas Gates was the president of Jamestown colony, but the necessary documentation was not in the ships that successfully arrived at Jamestown. Smith finished out his term, but agreed that the arrivals from England could take over once it was finished. Subsequently, an explosion injured Smith, and so he set sail back for England. Archer and Smith still had great enmity for one another.

During the Starving Time, Archer died in either 1609 or 1610 and was buried in a coffin. His grave was later located near a Jamestown church by the Jamestown Rediscovery Project. The grave was identified because he was a high-ranking leader who was at the age range of the skeleton, and through a comparison of his teeth and lead levels. A possible reliquary was found buried alongside him.

== Catholicism ==
After Archer's grave was discovered in 2015, some of the archaeologists who had found it came up with a theory that Archer was secretly a Catholic, based on the manner of his burial. Almost all the Jamestown settlers were known to be Anglican, and one of the motives for establishing Jamestown itself as a colony was to ensure that the Anglican Church would have a foothold in the New World, which up until that point had been dominated primarily by Catholic countries such as Spain.

Archer's parents were at some point fined for not attending Anglican services because they were Catholic. In addition, Archer was buried facing east, which was then generally only the burial orientation of ministers so they could see their churchgoers on the Resurrection. Archer had also attended Cambridge, which was known at that time, according to James Horn of the Jamestown Rediscovery Project, to be a university with some Catholic presence.

The piece of evidence that initially started the theory that Gabriel Archer was a Catholic, however, was a small silver box that was buried next to him. It is believed to be a Catholic reliquary that contains fragments of bones and a lead ampulla. Horn reports that the box was probably intentionally placed in the grave with him, presumably by one of Archer's fellow Catholics. However, the reliquary is not necessarily conclusive evidence, because at this time the Church of England was still shifting away from Catholic symbolism and Catholic practices were being repurposed for Anglican use.

If Archer were a Catholic, James Horn and others have mentioned that that could provide a reason for his animosity with some of the top colonial leaders. Before this, some rosaries and crucifixes had been found at Jamestown, but there was no evidence that they came from Catholic settlers specifically.

After disturbing Archer’s remains and the relics meant to accompany them in eternity, Historic Jamestowne has not reinstated the tomb and provides no explanation for this desecration.
