= John Martin (Jamestown) =

Early Virginia settler, naval captain, farmer, and politician

Captain John Martin
- Born: c. 1562; Greater London, Kingdom of England
- Died: c. 1632 (aged 69–70); Martin's Brandon Plantation, Virginia Colony
- Occupations: Sea captain, councillor, adventurer

Capt. John Martin (b. c. 1562—d. c. 1632) was a Councillor of the Jamestown Colony in 1607. He was the proprietor of Martin's Brandon Plantation on the south bank of the James River. Located in modern-day Prince George County, Virginia and known as Lower Brandon Plantation, in the 21st century, his c. 1616 plantation is both a National Historic Landmark and one of America's oldest continuous farming operations.

== Early life ==
Martin was the third son of goldsmith and Sir Richard Martin (d. 1617) and Dorcas Eccleston (d. 1599). Sir Richard later held office as Master of the Mint and Lord Mayor of London. (He is not the same as the Mr. Richard Martin (1570–1618) who was the recorder of London, counsel for the Virginia Company and organiser of The Society of Martin's Hundred, whose subsidiary "particular plantation" development c. 1618–19 was known as Martin's Hundred). Brothers Richard and Nathaniel Martin also worked at the Royal Mint with their father, the former as master and the latter as a clerk. Sir Richard was accused of misusing money deposited into his care at the Mint in 1597 and forced to resign as master in 1599. Sir Richard had a longstanding interest in overseas enterprise, investing in Martin Frobisher's 1577 arctic voyage (defaulted), Sir Francis Drake's circumnavigation voyage (1577–80), and investing in at least one of Sir Walter Raleigh's ventures. Sir Richard assisted John in obtaining his first commission in Drake's West Indies voyage (1585–86). Captain John Martin's relationship to Sir Richard Martin is attested by the will of his brother Richard Martin, goldsmith of London, dated 5 June 1616.

Martin commanded the Benjamin under Sir Francis Drake in the 1585–86 expedition to harass the Spanish ports in the New World. On his return, Martin married Mary, daughter of Robert Brandon, a prominent English goldsmith and supplier to Queen Elizabeth I. Before Martin left for the West Indies, he petitioned the Company of Mineral & Battery Works to be admitted to the society with a half-share from goldsmith Richard Wycliffe, recently deceased. At the court held on 16 December 1585, the company approved the transfer of stock to Martin and admitted him to their fellowship. His father, Sir Richard, was a founding member of the company. Brothers Richard and Nathaniel had shares in the company by 1596.

Martin may have accompanied Bartholomew Gosnold in his 1602 exploration of the New England coast, and it has been theorised that the island of Martha's Vineyard – spelled "Martin's Vineyard" in most 17th-century references – was named after Capt. Martin.

== Virginia Colony ==
Based on his family's business as goldsmiths and their long involvement in the Company of Mineral & Battery Works, the Virginia Company appointed Captain John Martin as Master of Battery Works for the new colony to be established in the Chesapeake. As Master of the Battery Works, he oversaw the prospecting and assaying of mineral ores discovered by the colonists. His son John Martin (d. 1608) and kinsman George Martin accompanied him to Jamestown.

Martin arrived in Virginia along with his teenage son John on 26 April 1607, when what came to be called the "First Landing" occurred at the place where south edge of the mouth of the Chesapeake Bay meets then Atlantic Ocean, a location the colonists named Cape Henry. He was named to the council to oversee the new colony by the Virginia Company in an order that was held in a sealed box which was only to be opened in Virginia. After finding a location to build their settlement which met the requirements set forth in their sealed orders, they founded Jamestown on 14 May 1607. Shortly after this, the Council elected Edward Maria Wingfield president of the colony. Wingfield reported that, "Master Martyn followed with, he reporteth that I do slack the service in the collonye, and doe nothing but tend my pott, spitt, and oven, but he hath starved my sonne, and denyed him a spoonfull of beere; I have friends in England shalbe revenged on him if ever he come in London."

Captain Christopher Newport who commanded the fleet of three ships which had brought them to the New World, sailed back to England (taking along the Susan Constant and the Godspeed, to return with additional supplies. While Newport was gone, in November 1607, Martin and Smith refused to allow the remaining colonists to return to England on their remaining ship, the Discovery. Martin objected during the winter, when John Smith was away having been captured by Indians, to President John Ratcliffe's appointment of Gabriel Archer as councillor.

Martin came into conflict with John Smith when, in the spring of 1608, the two gold refiners that Christopher Newport had transported to the colony who had led the fruitless efforts of looking for gold were sent back to London. Martin, being the son of a goldsmith, was very enthusiastic about the development; Smith was not.

Martin's teenage son John was among the majority of the earliest colonists who died during the first year at Jamestown. John Martin returned to England on the Phoenix in 1608 and returned on the Faulcon, with the ships of the ill-fated Third Supply which arrived in 1609, less their flagship, the Sea Venture, and the leaders and supplies which had been aboard. It is not clear when Martin returned again to England, but he may have returned to Virginia in 1624 on the Swan.

== Martin's Brandon Plantation ==
Captain John Martin died in 1632 at Martin's Brandon Plantation, which he had established on a 1616 land grant in Virginia, leaving his plantation to a grandson, Captain Robert Bargrave. Bargrave sold the plantation to three merchants from England. Then, from 1720 until 1926, the plantation became home to members of the prominent Harrison family of Virginia. Located in modern-times in Prince George County, Virginia and known as Lower Brandon Plantation, in the 21st century, Captain John Martin's c. 1616 plantation is both a National Historic Landmark and one of America's oldest continuous farming operations.

== Notes ==
- Brown, Alexander (1890). The Genesis of the United States: A Narrative of the Movement in England, 1605–1616. Houghton, Mifflin.
- Price, David A. (2003). Love and Hate in Jamestown: John Smith, Pocahontas, and the Heart of a New Nation. Alfred A. Knopf, New York. ISBN 9780375415418.
