= Jamestown supply missions =

Virginia colonization support 1607–1611

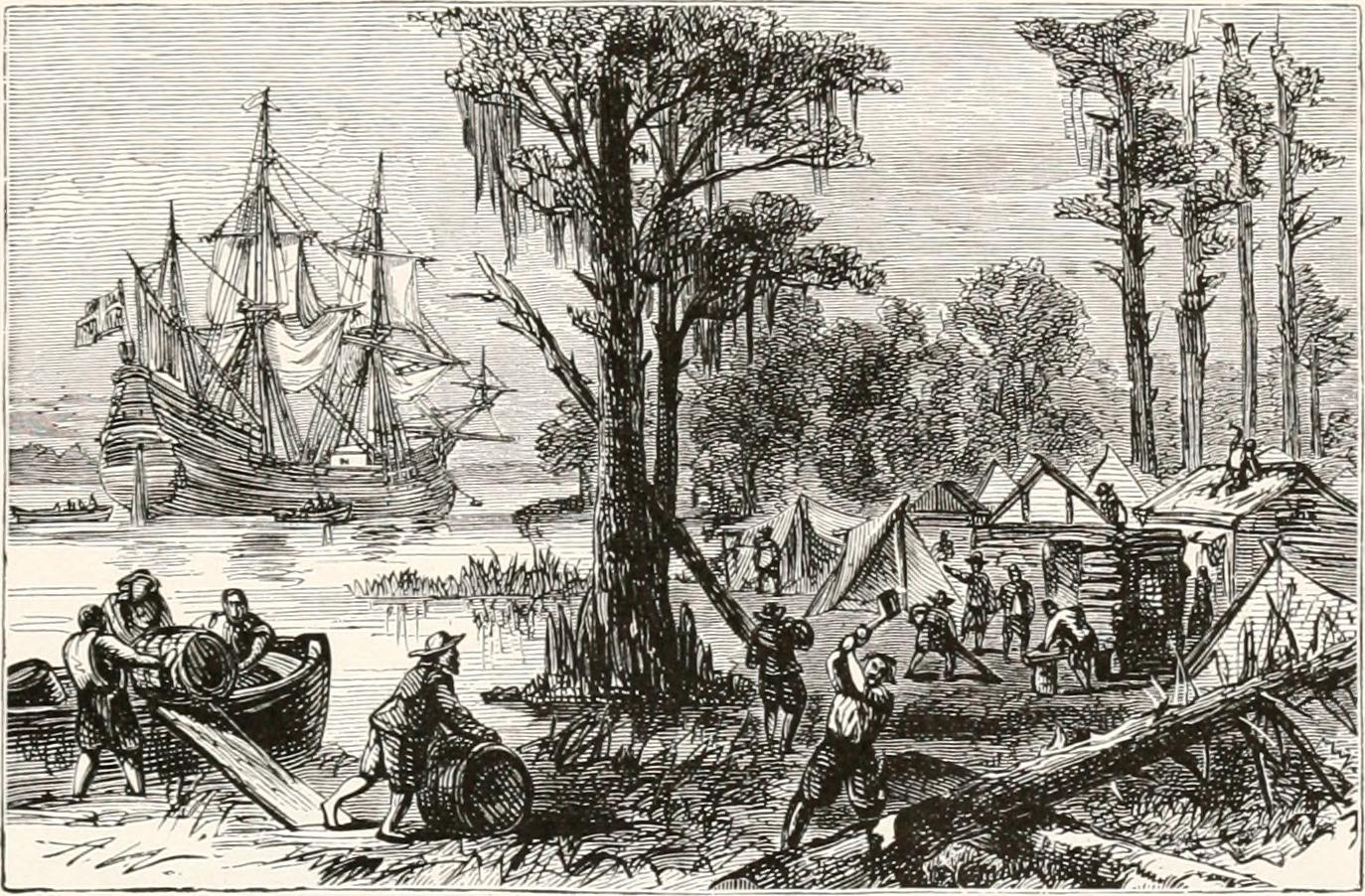
Arrival at Jamestown, 1607

The Jamestown supply missions were a series of fleets (or sometimes individual ships) from 1607 to around 1611 that were dispatched from England by the Virginia Company of London with the specific goal of establishing the company's presence and later specifically maintaining the English settlement of James Fort on present-day Jamestown Island. The supply missions also resulted in the colonization of Bermuda as a supply and way-point between the colony and England.

Leadership initially chose James Fort's location because it was favorable for defensive purposes. Although farming was attempted, most of the original settlers were wealthy gentlemen dependent on servants for labour; and, as hunters they quickly exhausted the area's supply of small game. To make matters worse, the most severe drought in 700 years occurred between 1606 and 1612. Consequently, the colonists quickly became dependent upon trade with the Native Americans and periodic supply from England for their survival. Captain Christopher Newport was tasked with the duty of leading the first three re-supply missions back to Jamestown. However, it was not until a fourth mission under Lord Thomas West that the settlement was finally able to establish both defensive and food security.

== Original mission ==
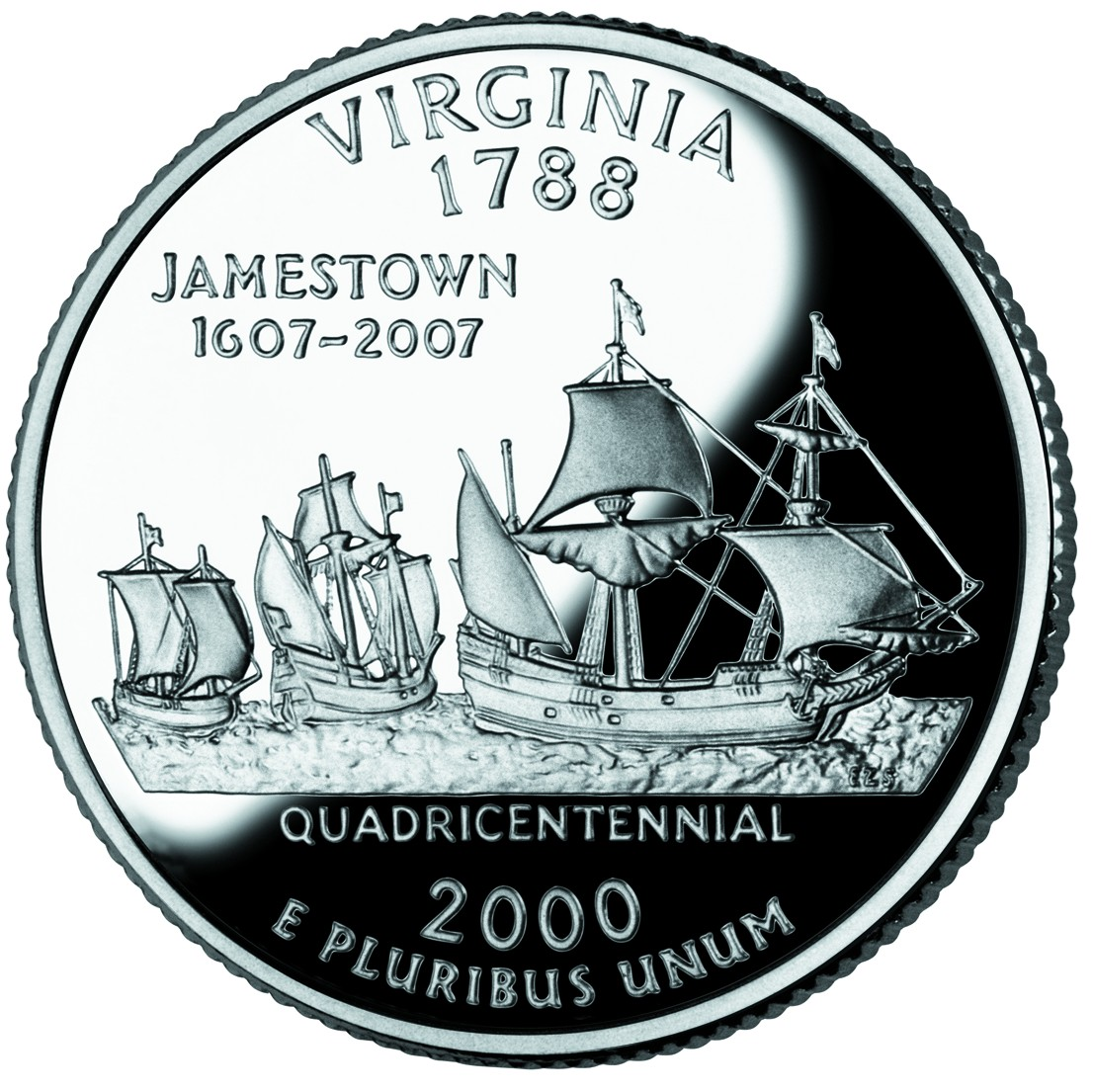
The original fleet, as commemorated on the Virginia State Quarter

The London Company organized a for-profit expedition to establish a settlement in the Virginia territory in late 1606. The expedition consisted of three ships which set sail on December 20, 1606 (O.S.), from Blackwall, with 105 passengers (men and boys) plus 39 crewmen. There were no women on the first ships.

Ship name (Note: Modern English spelling used. Names may differ from Early Modern English documents.)	Arrival month (Note: Dates between January 1 and March 25 are affected by the Old Style and New Style dates system. Most year notation is for the New Style.) (Note: Arrival dates are based on entry into Cape Henry or Point Comfort.)	Passenger (p) and Crew (c) count (Note: See also List of Jamestown colonists. Some counts included mariners and ship's crew. Manifest and living and dead counts vary from source to source.)	Notes
Susan Constant (Note: Flagship Susan Constant is sometimes documented as Sarah Constant.)	1607-04	50-71 p, 39 c	Made other undocumented voyages after 1607.
Godspeed (Note: Godspeed is sometimes documented as Goodspeede.)	1607-04	50-52 p	
Discovery (Note: Discovery is sometimes documented as Discoverie.)	1607-04	20-21 p	Remained at Jamestown.
Unnamed shallop/barge (Note: An assembled shallop, mostly used by John Smith. Stowed within the Susan Constant. Sometimes documented as "Discovery Barge". Not to be confused with the larger ship, Discovery.)	1607-04	0 p, 13-15 c	Remained at Jamestown.

=== Voyage ===
The fleet headed south-west towards the Azores. Early in the voyage, on February 13, 1606/07 (O.S./N.S.), near the Canary Islands, Captain John Smith was charged with mutiny, and Newport had him arrested and planned to execute him upon arrival in the Caribbean (and later in Virginia). The execution was never carried out, after the colonists landed at Cape Henry on April 26, 1607, and unsealed orders from the Virginia Company designating Smith as one of the leaders of the new colony, thus sparing him from the gallows. Passing Martinique on March 23, they also visited Dominica, on March 28, Nevis, and St. Croix, where they replenished their water and food. By April 6, 1607, the fleet arrived at the Spanish colony of Puerto Rico, where they stopped for provisions before continuing their journey. They landed on Mona and Monito Islands on April 7 and left on April 9, the last stop before the mainland.

After an unusually long voyage of 144 days and the death of only one passenger, the ships made landfall on April 26, 1607, at the southern edge of the mouth of what they named the James River on the Chesapeake Bay. A party of men then explored the area and had a minor conflict with Natives. so the colonists moved north. On 4 May [O.S. 14 May] 1607, they finally chose Jamestown Island (at that time a peninsula), further upriver and on the northern shore for the benefit of security and for deep mooring water.

However, after the long voyage, their food stores were sufficient only for each to have a cup or two of grain-meal per day. Further, the worst drought in 700 years occurred in the area between 1606 and 1612, affecting the Jamestown colonist's and local Powhatan tribe's ability to produce food and obtain a safe supply of water. In addition to settling, the early colonists were expected to make a profit for the owners of the company. The early settlers were excited by the apparent availability of gold, and from the outset settlers attempted to produce timber for export, given the seemingly inexhaustible supply within Virginia's virgin forests. However, they could not devote much time to developing commodity products, as they were too busy trying to survive. On June 22, 1607, Newport sailed back for London with Susan Constant and Godspeed carrying a load of supposedly precious minerals, leaving behind the 104 colonists and Discovery (to be used in exploring the area).

== John Smith explorations (1607) ==
Using Discovery and an assembled shallop left to the colony, Smith undertook three exploratory voyages of the Chesapeake Bay and along the various rivers seeking a supply of food for the colonists in June, July, and August 1607. However, while leading one food-gathering expedition in December 1607, this time up the Chickahominy River west of Jamestown, his men were set upon by Pamunkey natives, and Smith was captured. After being "saved" by Pocahontas, Smith returned alone to Jamestown just in time for the first supply in January 1607/08 (O.S./N.S).

== First supply mission ==
Arriving back in London on August 12, 1607, Newport delivered a letter from the council alongside his cargo of "gold" (which was quickly determined to be iron pyrite). He was then put in charge of the urgently needed re-supply mission, containing a few provisions and more than 70 additional colonists.

Ship name	Arrival month	Passenger (p) and Crew (c) count	Notes
John and Francis	1608-01 (Note: January, 1607/08 (O.S./N.S.))	80-100 p	
Phoenix (Note: Phoenix is sometimes documented as Phenix or Phœnix.)	1608-04	20-40 p	Was presumed lost, but arrived late.

=== Voyage ===
The first re-supply fleet, tracing the same route as the original fleet, arrived at the colony on January 2, 1607/08 (OS/NS). Upon his return, Newport found that the effects of the lack of planning and lack of skills amongst the original colonists, combined with Powhatan attacks, had quickly reduced the original settlement to only 38 survivors. However, despite replenishing the colony's supplies, the two ships also brought an additional 120 men (settlers and crew), as recorded later by Smith.

This proved troublesome, particularly when a few days later the fort caught fire, destroying most of the existing buildings, food, and supplies. Despite their original intention to grow food locally and trade with the local natives, the barely-surviving colonists became increasingly dependent upon external supply missions. After expanding fortifications, rebuilding shelters, and placing armed men to defend crops from native attacks, Newport felt he had sufficiently re-secured the settlement by the end of winter. Accordingly, he departed again for England on April 10, 1608, with another cargo of "gold". In his absence, the meagre food supplies quickly ran low, and although Native Americans brought some food, Smith wrote that "more than half of us died".

== John Smith explorations (1608) ==
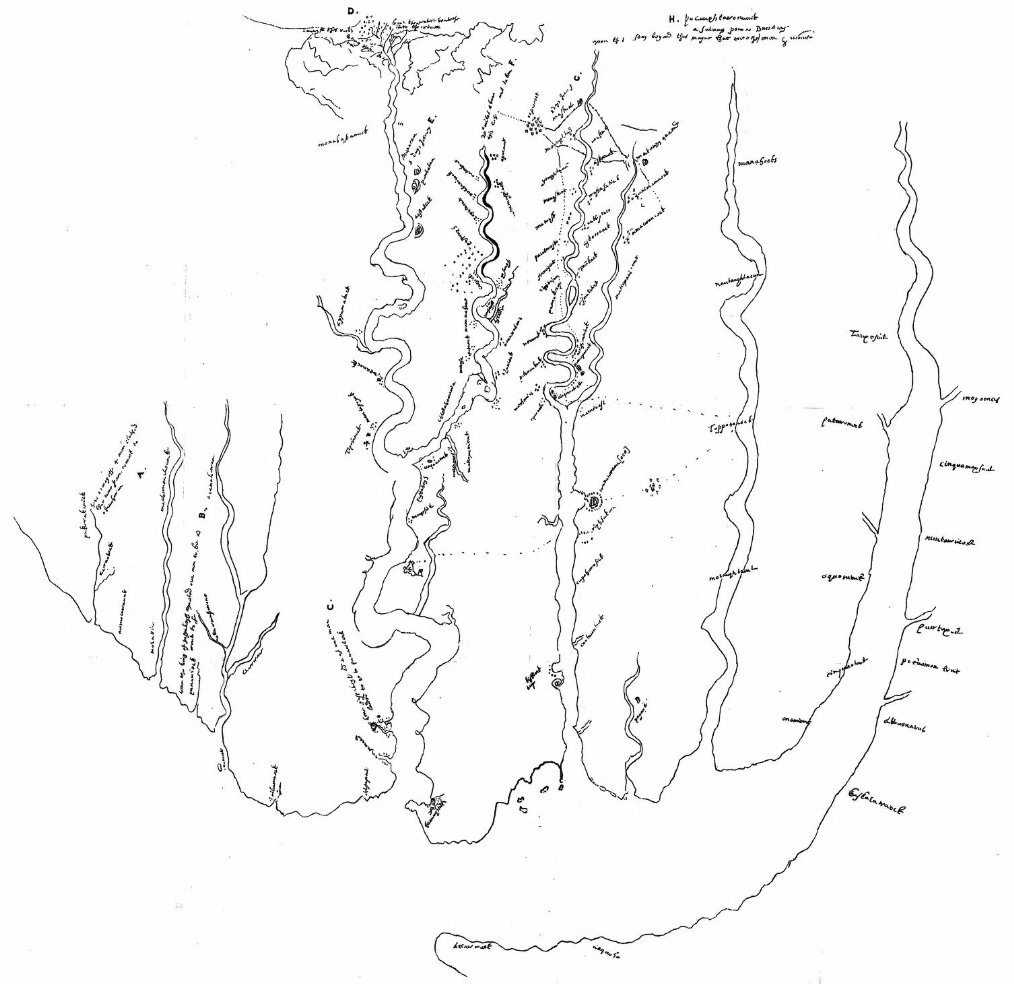
Chart of Virginia, 1608

Smith ventured into the Chesapeake Bay twice more in 1608, in the months between the first and second supply missions, charged by the company to search for gold and a passage to the Pacific Ocean. The first trip lasted from June 2 to July 21; a second, longer expedition spanned July 24 to September 7. Searching for badly needed food, he covered an estimated 3,000 miles (4,828 km), producing a map that was of great value to local explorers for more than a century. This time he successfully traded for food with the Nansemonds along the Nansemond River, and several other groups. He had mixed results dealing with the various other tribes, most of whom were affiliated with the Powhatan Confederacy. These explorations were later commemorated in the Captain John Smith Chesapeake National Historic Trail, established in 2006.

== Second supply mission ==
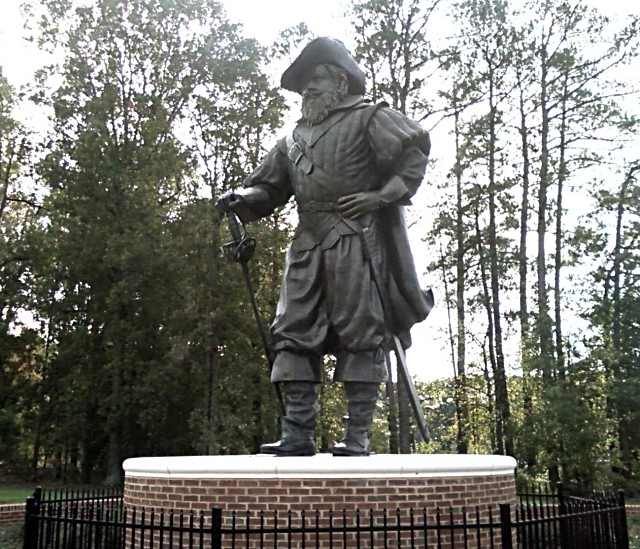
Statue of Christopher Newport at the university bearing his name

Newport and the ships arrived back in London on May 21, 1608, and despite another disappointment with false gold, an additional re-supply trip was quickly organized. Urgently needed supplies and 70 additional settlers were gathered, including two women: "Mistress Forrest" and Anne Burras "her maide" (the first women known to have come to Jamestown). Also included were the first non-English settlers. The company recruited these as skilled craftsmen and industry specialists: glassmakers, soapmakers, lumberjacks, and the like. Among these additional settlers were eight "Dutch-men" (probably German or German-speakers), Jamestown Polish craftsmen and Slovak craftsmen, who had been hired to help develop and manufacture profitable export products. William Volday (Wilhelm Waldi), a Swiss-German mineral prospector, was also among those who arrived in 1608. His mission was seeking a silver reservoir that was believed to be within the proximity of Jamestown. Some of the settlers were the artisans who built a glass furnace which became the first factory in America.

Ship name	Arrival month	Passenger (p) and Crew (c) count	Notes
Mary and Margaret (Note: Mary and Margaret is sometimes documented as Mary Ann Margaret or Mary-Margaret.)	1608-10	70 p	Included women and craftsmen.

=== Voyage ===
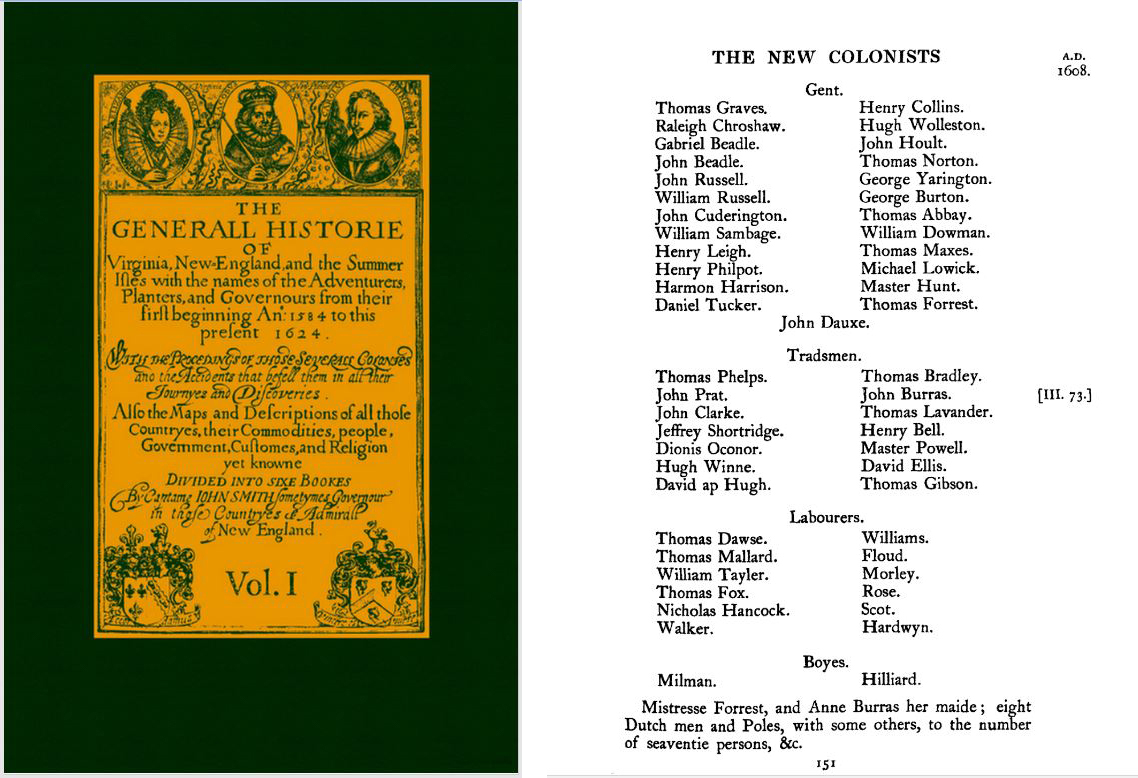
Incomplete list of passengers by Captain John Smith 1624

Newport's instructions were to search for any survivors of the Lost Colony of Roanoke, resume exploring for gold mines, and stage a "coronation" of Powhatan, making him a "sub-king" under James I. On October 1, 1608, the supply ship arrived following a journey of approximately three months. Following his orders, Newport searched for the lost colonists and gold mines and attempted a coronation, all without success.

He then returned to England, this time not with iron pyrite but with products of the New World including: "clapboard, wainscot, pitch, tarre, glasse, frankincense, and sope ashes". He arrived in London in mid-January 1609, and despite all these efforts, profits from these early exports were not sufficient to meet the expenses and expectations of the investors back in England, and no New-World silver or gold had been discovered, as earlier imagined. Despite these disappointments, the need for another, ideally much larger supply mission was conveyed to the leaders of the company.

== Samuel Argall's mission (1609) ==
In early 1609, Captain Samuel Argall, as an employee of the London Company, was commissioned to develop a shorter, more direct route for sailing from England across the Atlantic Ocean to the colony at Jamestown. He was also ordered to fish for sturgeon on the voyage. Rather than following the normal practice of going south to the tropics and west with the trade winds, Argall, aboard Mary and John, sailed west from the Azores to the Bermuda area, then almost due west to the mouth of the Chesapeake Bay. This voyage took only nine weeks and six days, including two weeks becalmed (compared to the three to five months of previous fleets), enabling the English to save on provisions and to also avoid hostile Spanish ships.

Upon his arrival at Jamestown, Argall found the colonists in dire straits, since in April an infestation of rats had been discovered, along with dampness, which had destroyed all their stored corn. He resupplied the colony with all the food and wine he could spare (which Smith bought on credit), and also brought the news that the company was being reorganized and was sending more supplies and settlers to Jamestown along with a new governor. Argall then returned to England at the end of the summer of 1609. His unexpected help was significant, in that it came to the colony at one of the most critical moments in its history, as it preceded the Starving Time, and without the provisions Argall had left, the colony may have been totally destroyed.

== Third supply mission ==
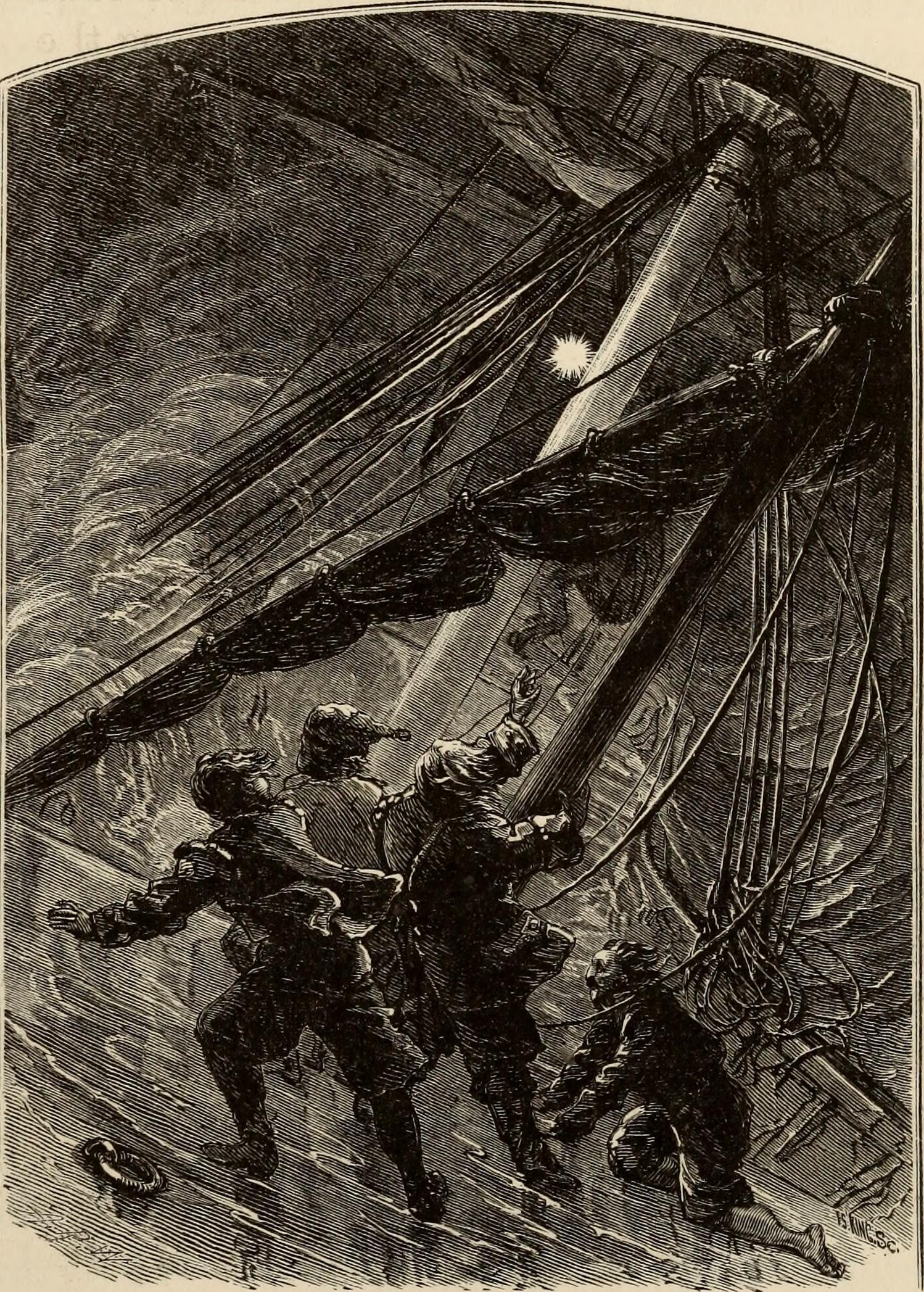
Depiction of Sea Venture in a tropical storm in the Atlantic, July, 1609. The entire flotilla was scattered.

On May 23, 1609, King James issued a new charter for the company to allow for reorganization and additional capital. Company treasurer Thomas Smythe organised a major supply mission, with the goal to rescue the failing settlement. It consisted of nine ships, between 500 and 600 passengers, including women and children, livestock and enough provisions to last a year in "the largest fleet England has ever amassed in the West". Newport, as vice-admiral, commanded Sea Venture, the new flagship of the company, which had been specially built for the purpose. It was considerably larger than the other eight ships, and carried a large proportion of the supplies intended for the colony. Also aboard the flagship were Admiral George Somers, William Strachey, Silvester Jourdain, Ralph Hamor, and Thomas Gates, people notable in the early history of English colonization in North America. On June 2, 1609, the fleet departed Plymouth, England.

Ship name	Arrival month	Passenger (p) and Crew (c) count	Notes
Sea Venture (Note: Flagship Sea Venture is sometimes documented as Sea Adventure or variants.)	Shipwrecked	105 p+c	Shipwrecked on Bermuda after a tropical storm. Included leadership of Virginia and fleet, including Admiral Sir George Somers and Sir Thomas Gates.
Diamond	1609-08	unknown	Encountered a tropical storm with Third Supply fleet. Passengers were infected with Bubonic plague.
Falcon (Note: Ship Falcon is sometimes documented as Faulcon. May be the same ship as the Silver Falcon.)	1609-08	100 p	Encountered a tropical storm with Third Supply fleet.
Blessing (Note: Ship Blessing is sometimes documented as Blessing (of Plymouth) or Blessinge.)	1609-08	100 p	Encountered a tropical storm with Third Supply fleet. Delayed with other ships.
Unity (Note: Ship Unity is sometimes documented as Unity (of London) or Unitie.)	1609-08	50 p	Encountered a tropical storm with Third Supply fleet. Passengers were infected with Bubonic plague.
Lion (Note: Ship Lion is sometimes documented as Lyon (of London).)	1609-08	50 p	Encountered a tropical storm with Third Supply fleet. Delayed with other ships.
Swallow	1609-08	unknown	Remained at Jamestown until November.
Virginia (Note: Ship Virginia is sometimes documented as Virginia of the Northern Colony or Virginia of Sagadahock.)	1609-10	13-18 p+c	Encountered a tropical storm with Third Supply fleet.
Catch (Note: Boat "Catch" was a ketch that has no known formal name.)	Lost	13 p+c	An unnamed ketch or pinnace (named by contemporary writings), towed behind a larger ship. Encountered a tropical storm with Third Supply fleet. Ship and all hands lost.
Unnamed Sea Venture longboat (Note: Pinnace (ship's boat) rigged for open ocean.)	Lost	8 p+c	Bermuda castaway attempt to bring message to Jamestown in a rigged "pinnace" or longboat. Either lost at sea or crew later taken by Virginia Natives.
Deliverance (Note: Deliverance was built from parts of Sea Venture in Bermuda. Also documented as Frobisher's Pinnace.)	1610-05	137-142 p+c	Survivors from Bermuda (137-142 passengers and crew) salvaged the Sea Venture and built two small sailing ships.
Patience (Note: Patience was built from parts of Sea Venture in Bermuda. Also documented as Somer's Pinnace.)	1610-05	137-142 p+c	Survivors from Bermuda (137-142 passengers and crew) salvaged the Sea Venture and built two small sailing ships.

=== Voyage ===
The fleet stayed together for seven weeks as they crossed the Atlantic Ocean, save for Virginia (which returned to England from the Azores). On July 25, the fleet ran into a massive 'tempest', believed to have been a hurricane, which lasted for three days, and all became separated. After the storm, Blessing, Falcon, Lion, and Unity came together and headed for Virginia,"falling into the James River" on August 11. Diamond appeared a few days later, and Swallow a few days after (around August 18). Virginia arrived some six weeks later on October 3. All in all, seven ships arrived safely at Jamestown, delivering most of the colonists but relatively few supplies. In the colony, there was no word of the fate of Sea Venture (which had been wrecked in Bermuda) or Catch (which had been lost), including the supplies, passengers, and leaders who had been aboard them. Four of the ships harbored sufferers of yellow fever, while Diamond and Unity brought bubonic plague to the colony, killing at least 30 emigrants on the journey (and more over the following months).

Blessing, Diamond, Falcon, and Unity returned to England on October 14 to advise of Jamestown's plight carrying Captain Samuel Argall, an injured John Smith, and 30 young men sent from England but rejected by the colony. However, no further supply ships from England arrived that year nor the following spring. In the absence of strong leadership and most of the supplies, all of which had been aboard Sea Venture, the existing and newly-brought settlers at James Fort were ill-prepared to survive the winter, resulting in the siege and "Starving Time" of 1609-1610, when most of the inhabitants perished.

=== Sea Venture ===
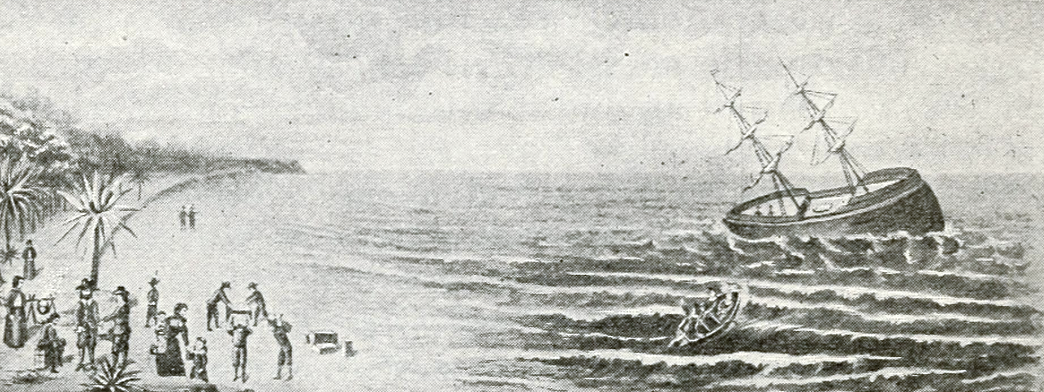
Wreck of Sea Venture

During the tropical storm, Sea Venture was separated from the seven other vessels of the third supply fleet and began taking on water through her new caulking. On July 28 and with bailing efforts failing, Somers had the ship deliberately driven onto the reefs at Discovery Bay in eastern Bermuda to prevent her sinking. The 150 passengers and crew members all landed safely, but the ship was disabled. Over a period of nine months, the survivors built two pinnaces—Deliverance and Patience—using local Bermuda cedar and hardware salvaged from the wreck. The original plan was to build only one vessel, Deliverance, but it soon became evident that one would not be large enough to carry the settlers and all of the supplies that were being sourced on the islands. During the building, Sea Venture's longboat was fitted with a mast and sent to find Jamestown, but neither it nor its crew were ever seen again. The named ships were provisioned with salvaged and local goods—from Bermuda the crew were able to gather pork from feral pigs, sweet potatoes, and onions, figs and olives from stock grown in Bermuda.

The vessels disembarked on May 20, 1610. By May 23 they had reached Old Point Comfort. The survivors of Sea Venture, led by Gates and Somers, assumed they would find a thriving colony in Virginia. Instead, they found the colony in ruins and practically abandoned. Of the 500 or so colonists living in Jamestown in the autumn, they found only 60 survivors with many of those also sick or dying. Worse yet, many supplies intended for Jamestown had been lost in Bermuda, and Gates and Somers had brought along with them about 140 additional people but only a small food supply. The decision was made to abandon Jamestown, and on June 7 everyone boarded Deliverance, Discovery, Patience, and Virginia to return to England.

== Francis West ==
In the interval between the departure of Smith for England and the arrival of the Sea Venture survivors, George Percy became president of the council in Jamestown. He however accomplished little while in charge, other than to order to construction of Fort Algernon at Old Point Comfort. To secure food, he had sent Francis West and James Davis up the Chesapeake Bay to obtain corn from the Patawomeck in 1609, but instead of delivering that food to the starving colony, West sailed Swallow directly back to England and avoided the Starving Time by abandoning Percy and the colonists. Percy wrote later that when West brought his ship loaded with corn back to Point Comfort, the captain in charge of Fort Algernon told everyone about the hunger at Jamestown, and instead of hurrying upstream to feed the colonists, "Captain Weste, by the persuasion, or rather by the enforcement, of his company hoised up sails and shaped by their course directly for England, and left us in that extreme misery and want."

== "Fourth" supply mission ==
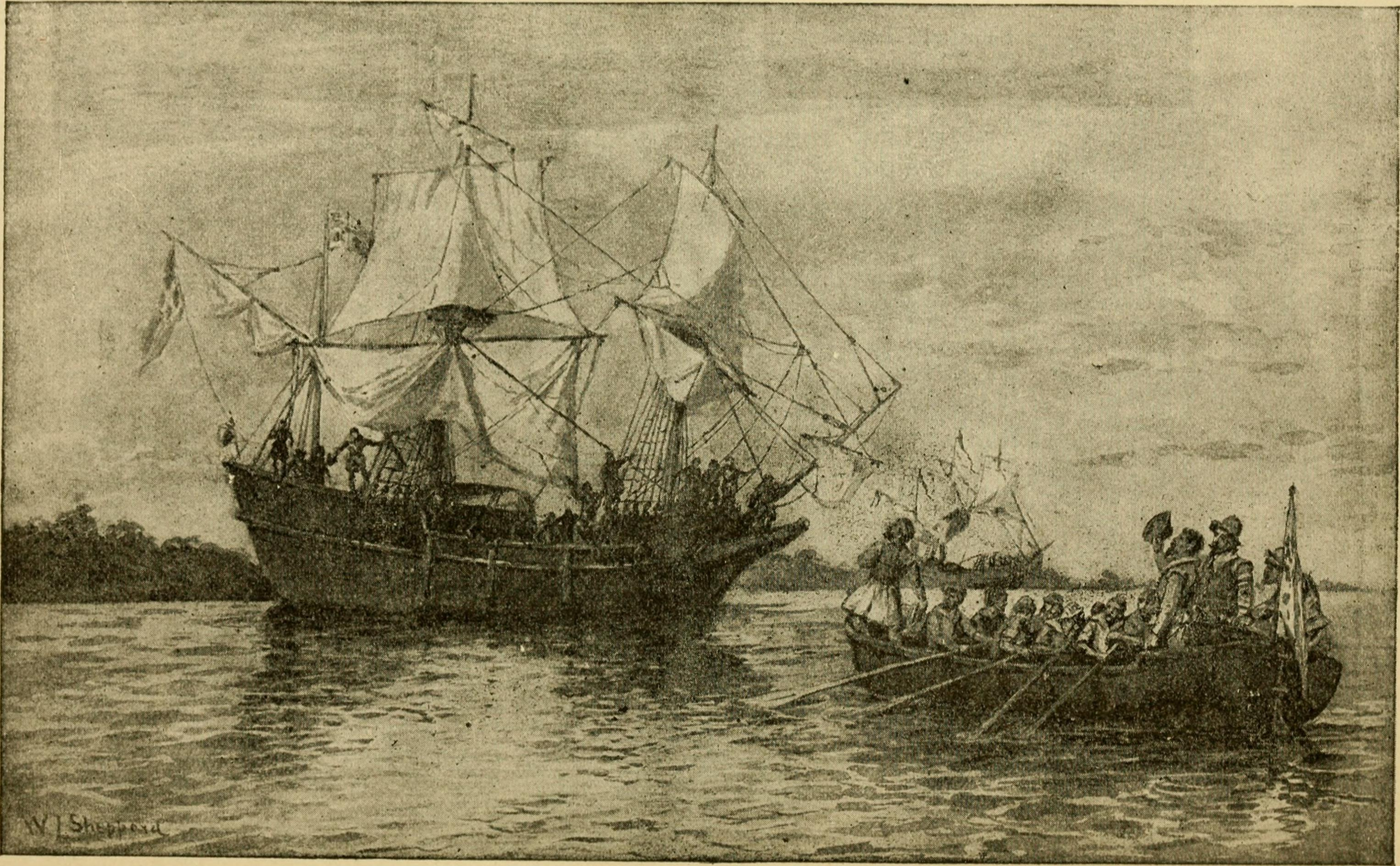
"A message from Lord Delaware--the Colony saved"

During the period that Sea Venture suffered its misfortune and its survivors were struggling in Bermuda to continue on to Virginia, the publication of Smith's books of his adventures in England sparked a resurgence of interest and investment in the company. There was also a religious call in England by clergymen and others to support the stranded colonists. Another mission was prepared, equipped with additional colonists, a doctor, food, and supplies, and heading this group was Francis West's older brother, Thomas West, 3rd Baron De La Warr, who also recruited and equipped an armed contingent of 150 men at his own expense.

Ship name	Arrival month	Passenger (p) and Crew (c) count	Notes
De La Warr (Note: Flagship De La Warr is sometimes documented as Delaware. Some historians contest the ship's existence.)	1610-06	100 p	
Blessing (Note: Blessing is sometimes documented as Blessinge of Plymouth.)	1610-06	100 p	
Hercules (Note: Hercules is sometimes documented as Herculese or Hercules of Rye.)	1610-06	30-50 p	First trip.
Hercules	1611-04	30 p	Second trip.

=== Voyage ===
West and his fleet departed Southampton on March 12, 1610, and arrived on the James River on June 9, just as the existing colonists were sailing downriver to leave Virginia. Intercepting them about 10 miles (16 km) downstream from Jamestown near Mulberry Island, West ordered the ships to return to the abandoned colony. This was not a popular decision at the time, but it proved to be a turning point in the English colonization of North America.

== Subsequent supply missions ==
After the return to Jamestown, the settlement had a population of around 375. Captain Robert Tyndall was directed to take Virginia to catch fish in the Chesapeake Bay between Cape Henry and Cape Charles. On June 19, 1610, Somers, not wanting to be subordinate to West, departed for Bermuda aboard Patience, accompanied by Captain Argall on Discovery, with the intention of gathering more food, including fish, sweet potatoes, and live pigs for Jamestown. Blown north towards Newfoundland, the ships became separated in thick fog. Argall attempted fishing before returning, reaching the Chesapeake on August 31, while Somers, who had continued on to Bermuda, became ill on the journey. He died in Bermuda on November 2 before completing the mission. Captain Matthew Somers, in charge of Patience and probably keen to secure his uncle's inheritance disobeyed orders by returning to Lyme Regis, England, with the preserved body of his uncle. He was able to provide an update to the company on the status of the colony.

On July 25, 1610, Hercules with Captain Adams was sent from Jamestown for supplies. It returned "soon after" the departure of Thomas West, who had left Virginia for the island of Nevis in De La Warr on April 7, 1611. Blessing and Hercules returned to England in September 1610 with Gates, Newport, Adams, and "others from Virginia". When the Jamestown garrison again required provisions in December 1610, Captain Argall was dispatched to the Potomac River and procured maize and furs there from Iopassus (Japazaws)

Newport, Vice-Admiral of Virginia, and Sir Thomas Dale, lieutenant Governor or Marshall of Virginia, left England in March 1611 for Jamestown with a fleet of three ships, 300 people, and supplies including horses and livestock. Sailing via Dominica and Puerto Rico, they arrived at Point Comfort on May 22, 1611. The ships were Elizabeth, Prosperous, and Starr.

The last major fleet of this time, under Sir Thomas Gates, lieutenant General of Virginia, sailed from England towards the end of May 1611 with three ships, 280 men, 20 women, 200 cattle, and "many swine and other necessaries". They sailed via the West Indies and arrived in Virginia on August 30th.

Ship name	Arrival month	Passenger (p) and Crew (c) count	Notes
Starr (Note: Flagship Starr is sometimes documented as Starre or Star. Despite records that it was in Virginia in 1608 to 1610, did not arrive until 1611.)	1611-05	150 p	
Elizabeth	1611-05	60 p	
Prosperous	1611-05		
Swann (Note: Flagship Swann is sometimes recorded as Swan of Barnstaple, or Sivian.)	1611-08	100 p	
Sarah (Note: Ship Sarah is sometimes documented as Sara. A ship name "Noah" is possibly a handwriting transcription error of "Sarah".)	1611-06		
Trial (Note: Ship Trial is sometimes recorded as Tryall.)	1611-06		
Unnamed livestock caravel I (Note: Ships or fleet containing livestock caravels may be origin of the ship name "Noah"; possibly a reference to Noah's Ark.)	1611-08	0 p	Brought cattle, swine, and horses but no passengers.
Unnamed livestock caravel II	1611-08	0 p	Brought cattle, swine, and horses but no passengers.
Unnamed livestock caravel III	1611-08	0 p	Brought cattle, swine, and horses but no passengers.

== Impact ==
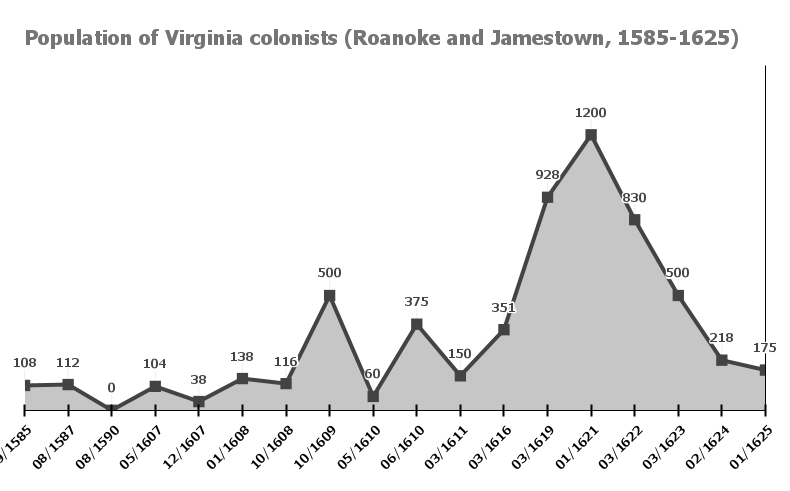
Population chart of Virginia, including Roanoke Colony and Jamestown numbers

By 1610, with the end of the Starving Time, the majority of the colonists who had arrived at the Jamestown settlement had died, and its economic value was negligible with no active exports to England and very little internal economic activity. Only financial incentives including a promise of more land to the west from King James I to investors financing the colony kept the project afloat. The timely arrival of West and the “Fourth” fleet in 1610 resulted in a renovation of the settlement and a counter-offensive against the Powhatan Confederacy, whose refusal to trade and siege of the fort had threatened the food security of the colony. The campaign ended the Powhatan siege and resulted in the marriage of Pocahontas and John Rolfe (a Sea Venture survivor) which introduced a short truce between the English and the Powhatan Confederacy.

This allowed the English to fully secure the colony's fortifications and housing, expand its farming, develop a network of alliances with other Indian nations, and establish a series of outlying smaller settlements. Colonists continued to die from various illnesses and disease, and the company continued to finance and transport settlers to sustain Jamestown. For the next five years, governors Gates and Dale continued to keep strict discipline, with Sir Thomas Smythe in London attempting to find skilled craftsmen and other settlers to send to Jamestown. By 1612, Rolfe successfully pioneered strains of tobacco that allowed the colony to cultivate and export its own cash crop, thereby ensuring a form of financial security.

== Notes ==
Table notes

Ship notes
