= Women of Colonial Virginia =

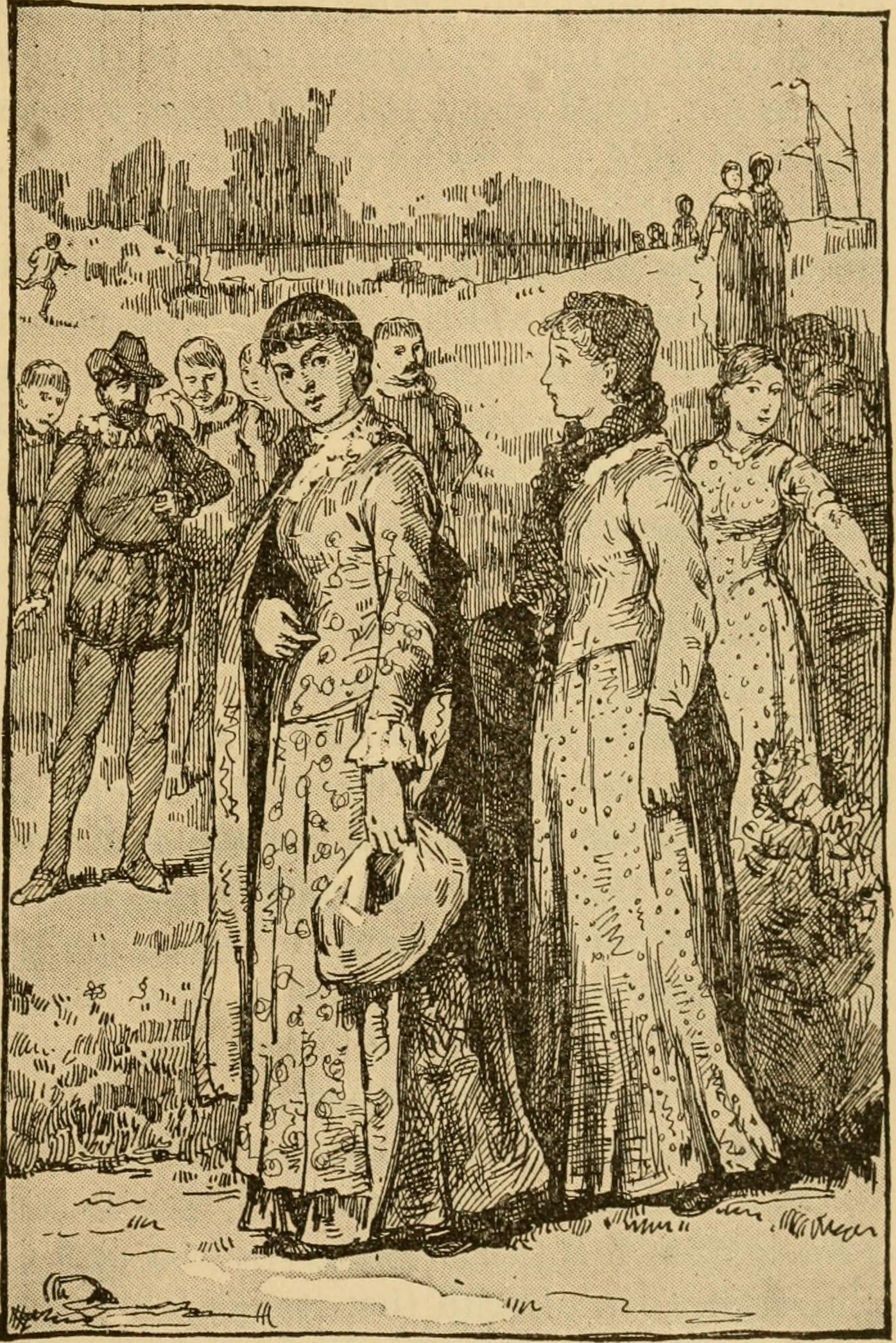
Colonists choosing wives (Virginia, c1615)

Humans have been living in what is now the state of Virginia since approximately 15,000-20,000 years ago. Prior to European contact, the region was inhabited by various Algonquin-speaking Indigenous tribes such as the Powhatans, the Pamunkeys, and the Appomattocs. At the time of European contact, along the coast of Tidewater Virginia, a region they called Tsenacommacah, the majority of tribes were united in the Powhatan Confederacy led by the Mamanatowick, Wahunsenacawh.

Indigenous women in these tribes played an important cultural role, being responsible for agriculture and having their ancestry tracked matrilineally for the purposes of inheritance and property. Cockacoeske, an Indigenous Weroansqua of the Pamunkey nation, would lead her people during the attacks by Bacon's Rebellion, and would negotiate with the colonists for mutual security against other rebellions or Indigenous groups. After the arrival of Europeans, the female colonial population was largely made up of indentured servants whose rights and freedoms were severely limited by their masters. Later on, in 1619, African slavery would be introduced to the Virginia Colony when twenty Africans from modern-day Angola were brought to Jamestown and sold into indentured servitude and though most would work off their indentures by 1630, chattel slavery would later be introduced and even the rights of free blacks would be severely restricted. During the 1630s, the ratio of women to men among servants living in the colony was one-to-six. Because of this, and because the English colonists largely viewed agriculture as man's work, they were often forced to send for more female indentured servants.

== Background ==
In May 1607, one hundred men and young boys were on an expedition where they arrived in what is now known as Virginia. This group were the first permanent English settlers in America. They named the colony of Jamestown, after the English King James. The site was chosen precisely for its location and beneficial factors. Jamestown was surrounded by water on three sides of the land; this made it easily accessible for ships to come and go. It was far enough inland, making it easier to defend from a possible Spanish attack. At the time, it was said that the men had to be able to create a living before any women could be a part of the colony.

In the colony's early days, the Powhatan Indians were known for helping the settlers. They would provide food and other supplies to the English settlers. In 1609, the Powhatan tribe could not help the settlers due to drought and insufficient supplies to share with the settlers. This was known as the Starving Time in Virginia, as most of the settlers died of starvation and diseases due to the lack of supplies. The essay, A Short History of Jamestown, notes that "As a result, they ate anything they could: various animals, leather from their shoes and belts, and sometimes fellow settlers who had already died due to starvation and disease." This illustrates how desperate the early settlers were for supplies and food.

== Roles before and after European colonization ==
In the early Virginia colonies, Native American women were responsible for household tasks and hard labor in the fields. It was normal for Native American women to have more responsibilities than men, as they were viewed as superior to men in certain ways. Powhatan women ( of Pochohontas's tribe) did not eat with the men, and the men had many wives. Most of the time the men would have to travel for food or trade, and leave the women alone for long periods of time. Therefore, women had to be able to survive without relying or depending on their husbands to do the heavy lifting.

Once European women arrived in the New World, the views on women's roles were conflicted. European women were always expected to do household tasks while caring for and teaching their children. In the eyes of Europeans, women were never supposed to step into men's roles. Some European women were sent to some of the Native American tribes to teach them English, primarily by teaching the women how to weave clothes, as well as their religion and culture. European wives whose families were wealthy enough to own a slave did not have to complete household tasks. However, those not wealthy enough to own a slave did not receive any help with the household chores.

One way European gender roles changed was in brewing. For centuries, English households brewed beer and cider themselves, and this was largely seen as a domestic duty of women. With the introduction of advanced distillation methods and organized commercial brewing along with hopped beer from the Dutch, alcohol production in the Atlantic world was largely shifting towards men's role. In the Chesapeake colonies of Maryland and Virginia, however, alcohol remained women's work to the extant that Virginia was said to be "a colony [of] water drinkers" because they had so few women and women with brewing skills were brought from England as wives. would come to often favor middle-class women, specifically those with a family history of tavern keeping, when it came to issuing tavern licenses as a way of policing the colony. They were seen as more able to keep working-class men from neglecting their responsibilities and protect against alcoholism.

== Reason for immigration ==
Women were known to provide a sense of stability. They came to the Jamestown Colony to marry men in the colony or to serve as indentured servants. Some women also came to the colony at a young age with their families, such as Cecily Jordan Farrar. In 1610, the colony's focus was on establishing families. Women were married soon after their arrival to the colony and were then expected to provide children to support the colony's growth. Single women could not own land after 1618 because the Virginia Company felt that if women could uphold land, they would be less likely to marry. This was a concern since "Women frequently gave birth to ten or twelve children, but childbirth was very dangerous for women."

Up until 1654 and the Anthony Johnson v. John Casor case, if a woman was of African descent, then she was a part of the indentured servant population. As a result of that case, there was a change in legal status and they were considered slaves. African American women were first brought to Virginia in 1619. There were three women and 20 men. They were sold into bondage to wealthy planters like Governor George Yeardley. As time passed, African American women were forced to work in the fields, jobs that were known as part of the men's role in American and European society, as well as perform domestic duties. Black women were also seen as a way to produce native-born slaves. There were class, race and gender structures in Colonial America. The female indentured servants did not encounter any conditions different from what they experienced at home in England, from household chores to farming. The role of women was clearly defined. If she belonged to the planter (upper) class, she was expected to supervise the slaves, attend to the household, and support the man. The farmers' wives found life harder; toiling dawn to dusk and beyond, in the house and the field. The difficulty of this life led to more dependence on and respect for the woman's role.

== Women's rights ==
In the early stages of the Virginia colonies, women did not have as many rights as they did in England. Women could not participate in many things such as voting, owning land, or even holding political office. If a woman was unmarried, their fathers held the rights to them until married, when they were taken into the care of their husband. The only women allowed to escape the control of a man were widows. Even if a widow decided to remarry after her husband's death, she had the right to control her property. To keep control over the property given to her by her deceased husband, a widow had to make legal arrangements. These arrangements would prevent a future husband from taking over the rights to the land.

== Indentured servants ==
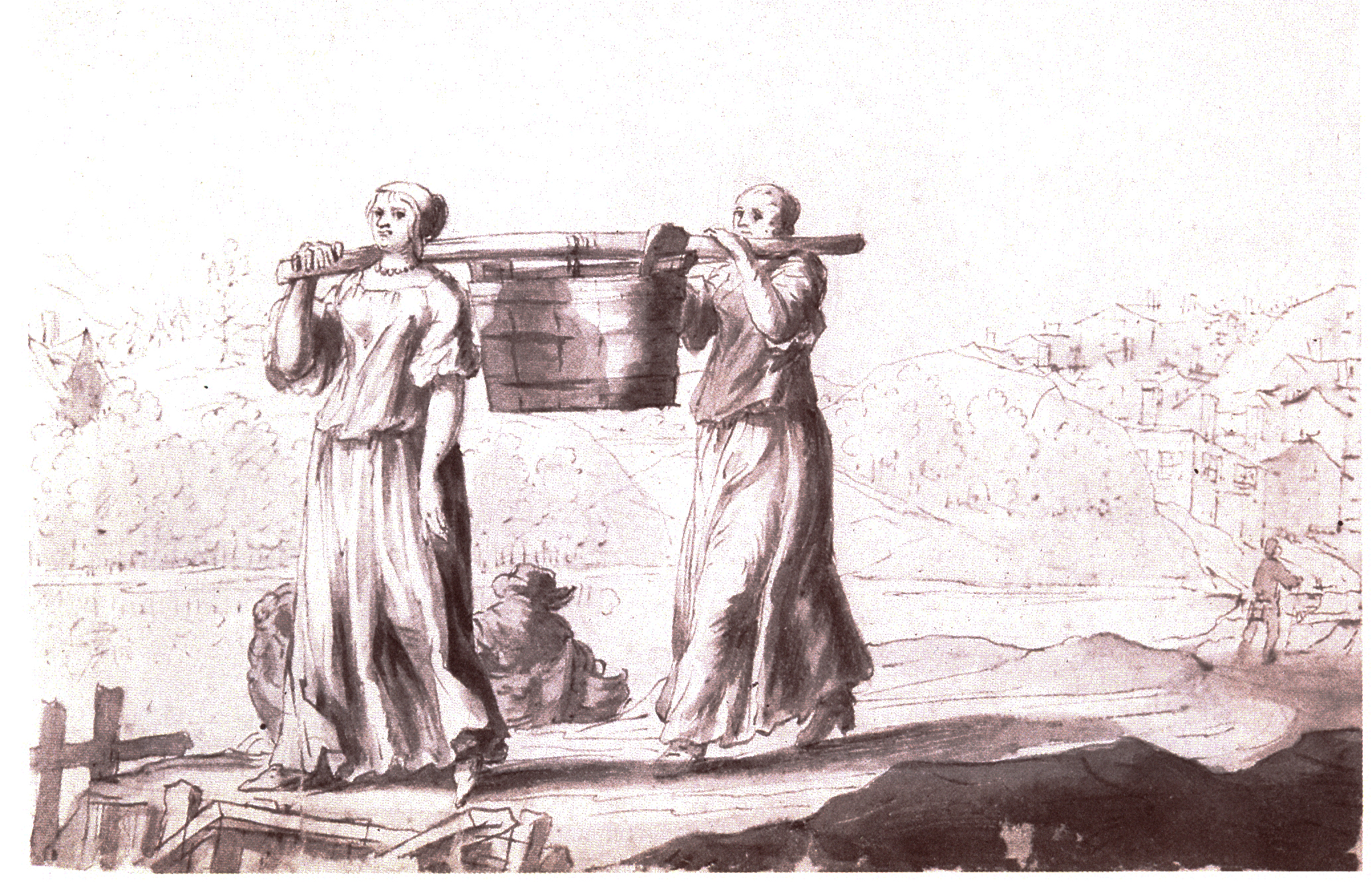
Women's work in the 17th century, carrying away the communal latrine

Twenty African indentured servants were brought over in a Portuguese ship in 1619. Prior to this, indentured servants were white. Black people were not enslaved until the case of Anthony Johnson v. John Casor in 1654. Being an indentured servant meant that one had to work for a particular length of time to pay for their transport to the New World. Those considered to be an indentured servant were not allowed to marry. After they had served their time, the indentured servants were free. In the 1620s, indentured servants contributed to Virginia's economy and society. Servants were a large part of maintaining the economy, and without the servants and slaves, Virginia would have had major economic problems. The original settlers had a hard time keeping up with all of the work that needed to be done. It was common for servants and slaves to become overwhelmed with the workload, with some considering running away to live with the Native Americans. If a servant or slave were caught running away from their master, they could be put to death, which would technically be destroying personal property, as slaves cost money and produced labor. In some cases, masters would treat their indentured servants and slaves respectfully rather than beat them. This gave them a sense of reliability and made it more likely that they would ask to work for the owner the following year to pay the indenture had expired.

In 1640, views on race changed for slaves.

"In 1640, three Virginia servants - two Europeans and one African - ran away from their masters. Following recapture, a Virginia judge ordered the European servants to serve their master for one more year while the African servant was ordered to serve his master for the rest of his life."

By 1622, African American women were considered more valuable since they could work in the fields and the household. This led the Virginia Company to pass a law to obtain more African American women who could provide a dual workload.

Indentured servants were chattel. The master had no financial investment in them, and after they served their contract, they were freed and given clothes, seed and often a plot of land. Slaves, on the other hand, were property and masters had a financial investment in them and thus their well-being, as they were expected to produce work for life and not a term of years.

Female indentured servants did not have complete bodily autonomy, nor the freedom to get married without the consent of their masters. In 1662, an act "against ffornication" was passed by the Virginia General Assembly. This addressed the problem of indentured servants getting pregnant that led to their masters losing out on potential profits and labor. According to the law, servant women who had a child out of wedlock before their indenture expired, they would be forced to pay two thousand pounds of tobacco to their master lest they serve an additional two years on top of their indenture.

== Women of the Virginia Colonies ==
=== Pocahontas (Matoaka) ===
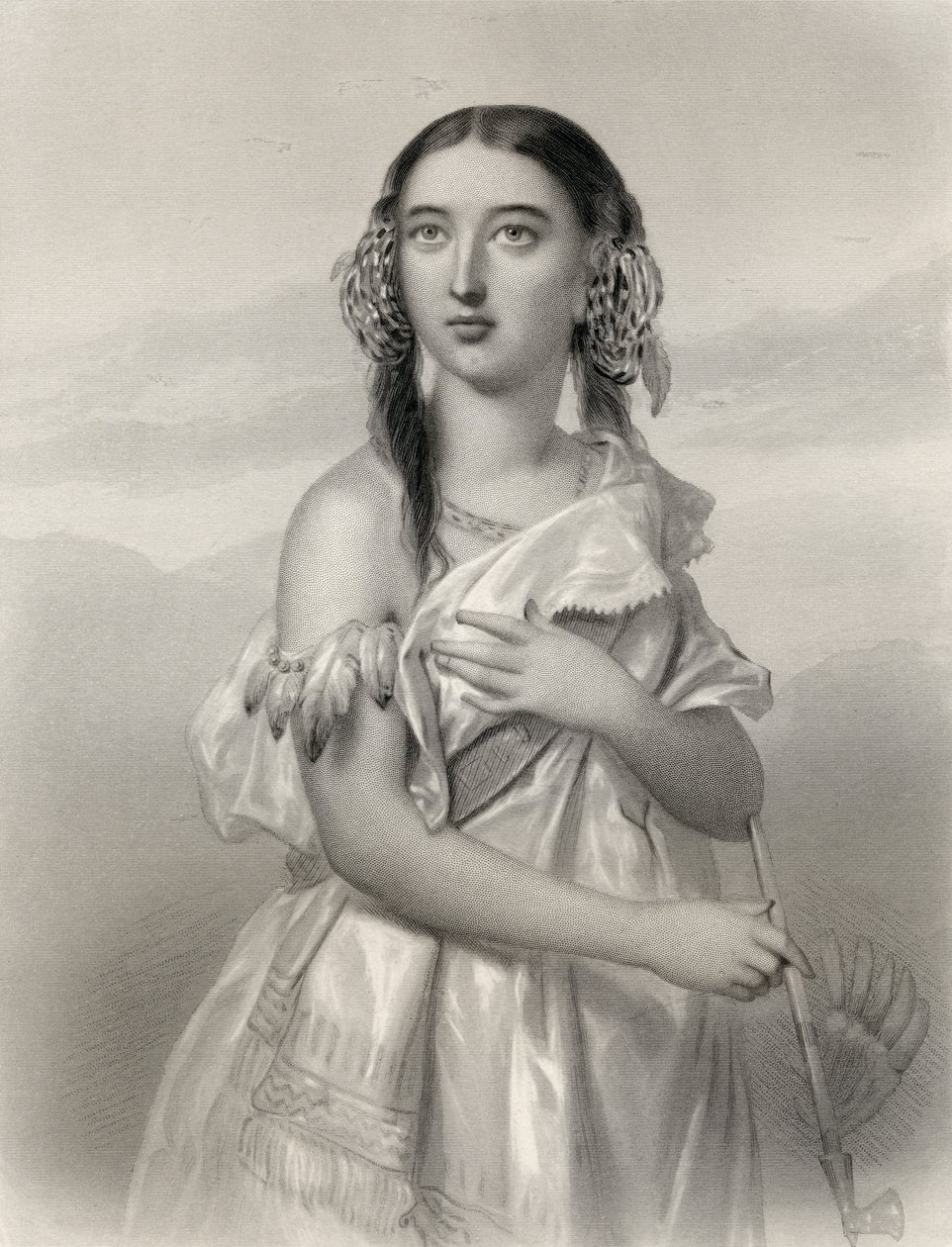
Illustration of a young "Matoaka" (Pocahontas)

Pocahontas was the first woman to help the colonists and become a part of the Jamestown colony. She was the daughter of Wahunsenaca, the chief of the Native American tribe, Powhatan. Her mother died while giving birth to her, and Matoaka was later renamed Pocahontas. She was originally kidnapped by the English settlers, which caused riots between the Native Americans and the colonists. Pocahontas was viewed as a sex object by the men and held against her will. Her role at the beginning was to bring food to the early settlers of Jamestown. She eventually became educated and was baptized into the English religion. At the time, the religion of the English Church was Protestantism. In 1614, she married an English settler, John Rolfe. Her marriage to Rolfe helped to calm the tension between the English and Native Americans. She later died in England in 1617.

=== Cockacoeske ===
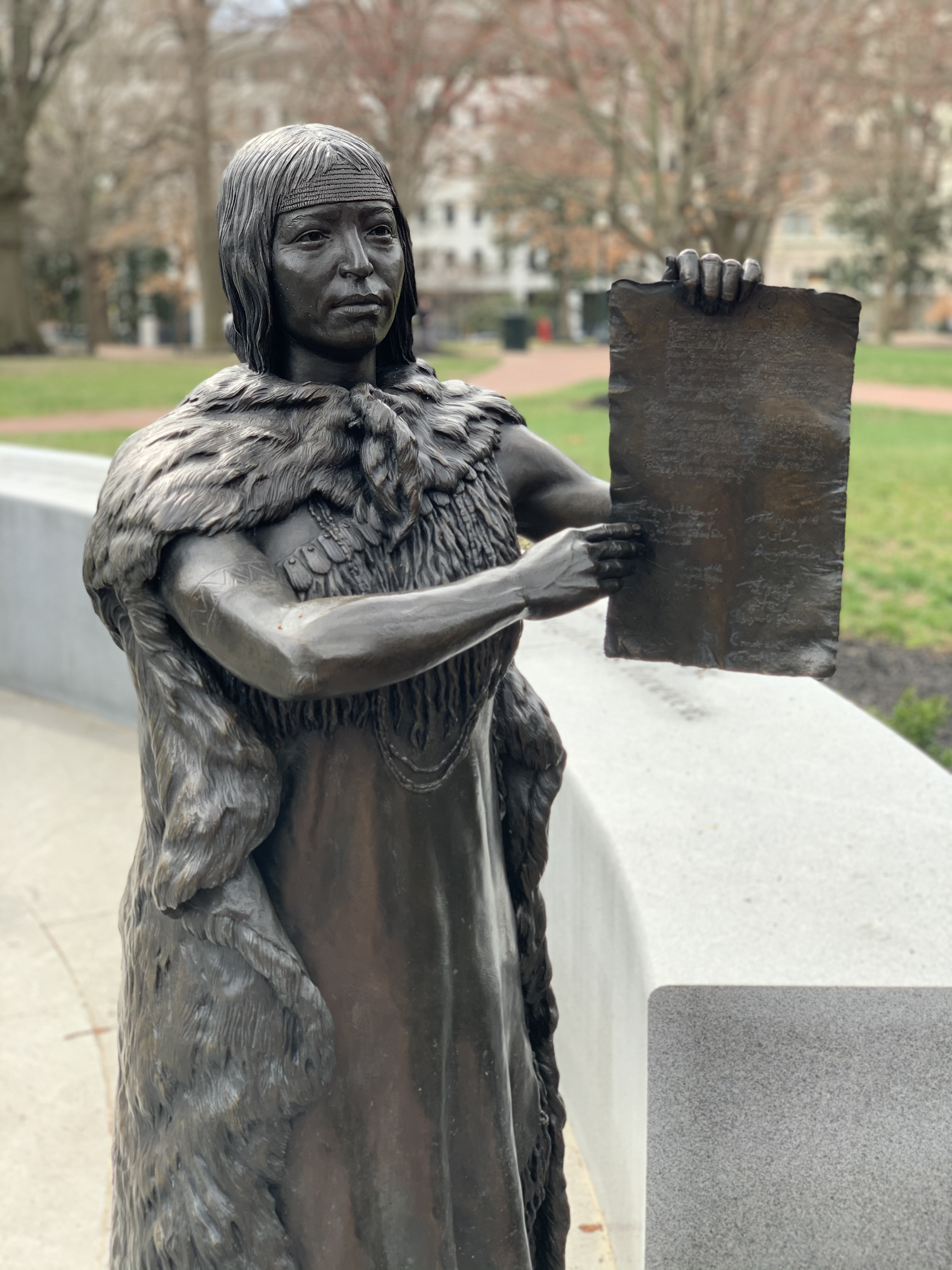
A statue of Cockacoeske, located in Richmond, Virginia

Cockacoeske was an Algonquin Weroansqua of the Pamunkey nation. Known to the English as 'Queen of the Pamunkeys', she would come to power after the death of her husband in Totopotomoy, who himself ruled from 1649 to 1656. She led the Pamunkey during Bacon's Rebellion, during which Nathaniel Bacon attacked, enslaved, and killed many of her people, with her narrowly escaping before eventually appealing to the colonial leadership and offering an alliance. She would later sign the Treaty of Middle Plantation on May 29, 1677.

=== Mistress Forrest and Anne Burras ===
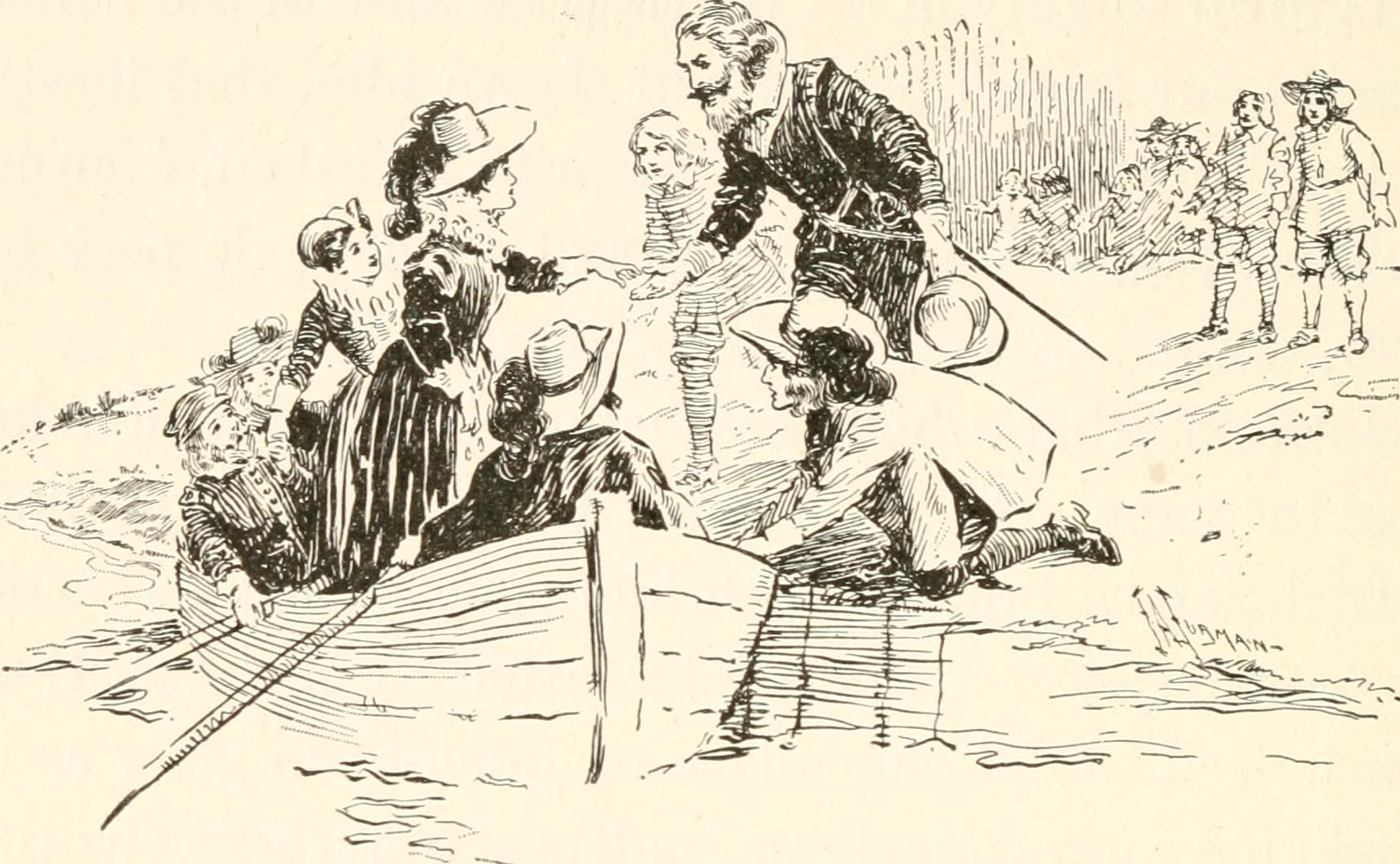
Conjectural sketch of Mistress Forrest and Anne Burras arriving in Jamestown, Virginia (1608)

Mistress Margaret Forrest was the first English woman settler who came to Jamestown in 1608. Margaret came alongside her husband Thomas Forrest and their maid, Anne Burras. She was also the first woman in Jamestown to give birth to a child. Mistress and her maid were said to be the only two women of the colony until 1609, when another ship came over. She and her maid were both considered to be a sense of stability for the colony. This was because before they had arrived, the colony had consisted of men and young boys. Without Mistress and Anne, the role of women known to England was not being fulfilled.

Anne Burras was Mistress Forrest's maid and had come over with her in 1608. She was the first of many willing to leave what she knew to go to the colonies, where her future was unknown. She married a man named John Laydon three months after her arrival. She was only fourteen when she married her twenty- eight-year-old husband. Their wedding was the very first to occur in Jamestown. They had four daughters together and found it hard to stay in Jamestown. They struggled to raise their daughters in Virginia, but fought for stabilization. Burras was one of a few who survived both the Starving Time and the Indian Massacre in 1622.

=== Temperance Flowerdew ===
Temperance Flowerdew came to Jamestown in the fall of 1609 with four hundred ill-fated settlers. It was said that she came over on the Falcon, a convey ship, with other ships when they were caught in a storm, which caused some to go missing. She survived the illness and sickness of the Starving Time and returned to England. In 1619, she returned to Jamestown, married to Governor George Yeardley. Flowerdew became Lady Yeardley when Yeardly became the governor of the colony. Her husband made a treaty in which he had one thousand acres of land granted in his wife's name. After her husband died, Flowerdew married Governor Frances West in 1628. She died a few months later.

=== Cecily Jordan Farrar ===
Cecily Jordan Farrar came to Jamestown in 1611, a year after Temperance Flowerdew. Three days after her husband Samuel Jordan died in 1623, Reverend Grivell Pooley claimed to have proposed and alleged that she accepted. Later that year, she disavowed Pooley's claim by contracting herself to another suitor, William Farrar in front of the Governor Yeardley and the Council of Virginia. This started the first breach of promise suit in English North America, which was unusual because a woman was the defendant. The case took two years to settle, but Cecily prevailed. Reverend Pooley put up a bond promising to release Cecily from any obligations to him. In the meantime, Cicely became the head of household for the 450-acre family plantation Jordan's Journey. After the case was settled, she married William Farrar.

=== Jane Peirce ===
Jane Peirce [sic] settled Virginia with her mother, Joane Peirce [sic], on the Blessinge in 1609. Both she and her mother managed to survive the Starving Time, with her father (William Peirce) being castaway on Bermuda until arriving in May, 1610. Her mother was known as the master of gardening within the colony. Jane grew up learning from her mother. In 1619, she married John Rolfe after Pocahontas had died in 1617, and had a daughter. Her daughter died in 1635 at the age of 15.

=== Jane Dickenson ===
Jane Dickenson and her husband came to Virginia as indentured servants in 1620. She was sent to a plantation along the James River. During the Native American uprising, she was captured and held captive for close to a year. A doctor by the name of Dr. John Pott saved her with a ransom. After her rescue, she became a servant for the Potts family and moved to Jamestown. In 1624, she approached the governor and asked for her freedom. She pleaded that her time serving the Potts family was harsher than being captive with the Native Americans.

=== Hannah Bennett Turner Tompkins Arnold ===
Hannah Bennett Turner Tompkins Arnold was her parents' only surviving child; because of this, she inherited over four hundred acres of land in the 1630s. Throughout her life, she obtained a large amount of land. While she was married to her first husband he helped her to get the title for her father's land. When he died she became a widow and obtained all the land he had in his possession. She went through the same process with her second and third husband as well. She became well known and an important part of the community because she had obtained so much land.

=== Mary Aggie ===
Mary Aggie was a slave to Anne Sullivan, who was a tavern owner in Williamsburg, Virginia. Mary tried to sue Anne for freedom in 1728, but the judge did not agree and withheld her freedom. Mary tried to show her beliefs and faith in the Christian religion to appeal to the judge. This helped her later, when she was charged of stealing from her owner in 1730. She was watched carefully until she was caught stealing three sheets from her "owner" that were worth forty shillings. At this time, the punishment for stealing was usually death or severe corporal punishment. Yet, for Mary, it was not. She convinced the judge that she was a faithful Christian, so he said she qualified for clergy. This meant that because it was her first offense, she did not receive any charges. Her case went on for months and, in May 1731, she was forced out of the colony and sold as a slave to another colony. Since she tried to fight for her rights, she became a part of history and all Virginians received the right to plead clergy on their first conviction, no matter what their race or gender was.

=== Christina Campbell ===
Christina Campbell was raised in the Williamsburg Virginia colony. After her husband died in 1752, she was left a widow who had to support her two daughters. To help support her family she opened and ran her own tavern successfully for more than twenty years. It was said that her father John Burdett was a tavern owner, and her parents taught her the skills needed to run a tavern. Christina was also a slave owner, which helped her maintain the workload at the tavern and at home. She sent her slave children to a school for African American children who could be either free or enslaved. Not many slave owners were willing to do this, as most slave owners were harsh towards their slaves.

=== Mary Draper Ingles ===
Mary Draper Ingles was an early settler of western Virginia. In the summer of 1755, she and her two young sons were among several captives taken by Shawnee warriors after the Draper's Meadow Massacre during the French and Indian War. They were taken to Lower Shawneetown at the junction of the Ohio and Scioto rivers. After two and a half months, Ingles escaped with another woman and trekked 500 to 600 miles. They averaged walking between eleven and twenty-one miles a day, and crossed at least 145 rivers and creeks and the Appalachian Mountains to return to her home in what is now Blacksburg, Virginia. Forty-two days after her escape, she reached the home of her friend Adam Harman on December 1, 1755. Mary and her husband later established the Ingles Ferry across the New River, and the associated Ingles Ferry Hill Tavern and blacksmith shop. She died there in 1815, at 83 years old.
