= Laydon =

Laydon is a surname. Notable people with the surname include:

- Anne Burras Laydon (fl. early 17th century), early English settler in Virginia
- Virginia Laydon (1609–?), first English child to survive to adulthood born in modern-day Virginia
