= Virginia Laydon =

First English child born in Virginia

- Born: 1609; Jamestown, Virginia Colony
- Known for: First surviving child born in the Virginia Colony
- Parents: John Laydon (father); Anne Burras (mother)

Virginia Laydon (b. 1609) was the first English child to survive to adulthood who was born in what would become the British colony of Virginia. She was the second white English child in the US, after Virginia Dare (who was born in the Roanoke Colony.)

Laydon's mother Anne Burras was one of the first two women to arrive in Jamestown, along with Mistress Forrest who employed Anne as a maidservant. In 1608, shortly after arriving at Jamestown, Anne married carpenter John Laydon. He had arrived in 1607 aboard the Susan Constant. Virginia was born in October 1609 and baptized in Jamestown. She survived the "Starving Time" that occurred in the winter of 1609–1610, during which more than 88% of the Jamestown colonists perished.

The family, including Virginia and her three younger sisters, is recorded among the residents of Elizabeth City Parish in 1625.

== See also ==
- Virginia Dare
- Peregrine White
