= Thomas Forrest (colonist) =

Financier of the Virginia Company

Thomas Forrest Esquire
- Born: May, 1572; Morborne, Huntingdonshire, Kingdom of England
- Died: 1641 (aged 68–69); St. Mary's City, Maryland
- Occupation: Adventurer
- Spouse: Mistress Forrest (presumed)

Thomas Forrest, Esq (b. 1572 in Morborne, Huntingdonshire, England – d. 1641 in St. Mary's City, Maryland), was a gentleman financier in the Virginia Company. At that time, "gentleman" denoted a man of the lowest rank of the English gentry, standing below an esquire and above a yeoman. By definition, this category included the younger sons of the younger sons of peers, knights, and esquires in perpetual succession; thus the term captures the common denominator of gentility (and often armigerousness) shared by both constituents of the English aristocracy: the peerage and the gentry.

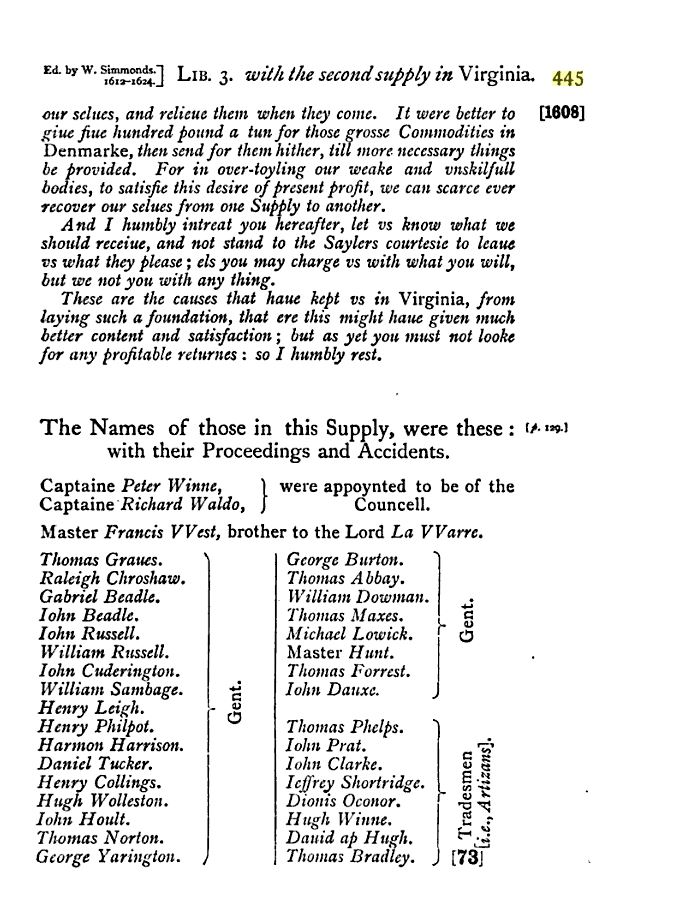
Page 445 The Generall Historie of Virginia, New-England, and the Summer Isles, by Capt. John Smith

On October 1, 1608, what is known as the Second Supply came to the new colony of Virginia aboard the English ship the Mary and Margaret under Captain Christopher Newport to resupply the colony at Jamestown, Virginia. Thomas Forrest was listed as a gentleman on that ship as shown on its manifest. This ship brought with it the first two women to come to Jamestown, one of whom was Thomas Forrest's second wife Margaret Foxe and the other Anne Burras, Margaret's "maid". Thomas Forrest is said in genealogies that he and Margaret had married on August 16, 1605, in St. Giles in the Fields, London, England, four years after Peter was born.

Thomas's elder brother, Miles Forrest, inherited the title to their father's estates and the younger Thomas set out for the adventure of securing new land in a new colony. Thomas was a member of the Virginia Company (also known as the Charter of the Virginia Company of London or the London Company) that established the colony. In this pivotal time in English history toward the end of the reign of Queen Elizabeth I, the power of the landed gentry for whom wealth was land, was giving way to the rising class of merchants, for whom wealth was trade in shippable goods, such as gold, tea, and tobacco. Thomas was one of the gentry who made the transition from the old to the new.

The origins of Thomas Forrest and his wife require further documentation. Thomas Forrest was listed as a shareholder in the Second Virginia Charter, granted by James I to the London Company of Virginia on May 23, 1609. (See the last line of the charter for his name on page 54.)

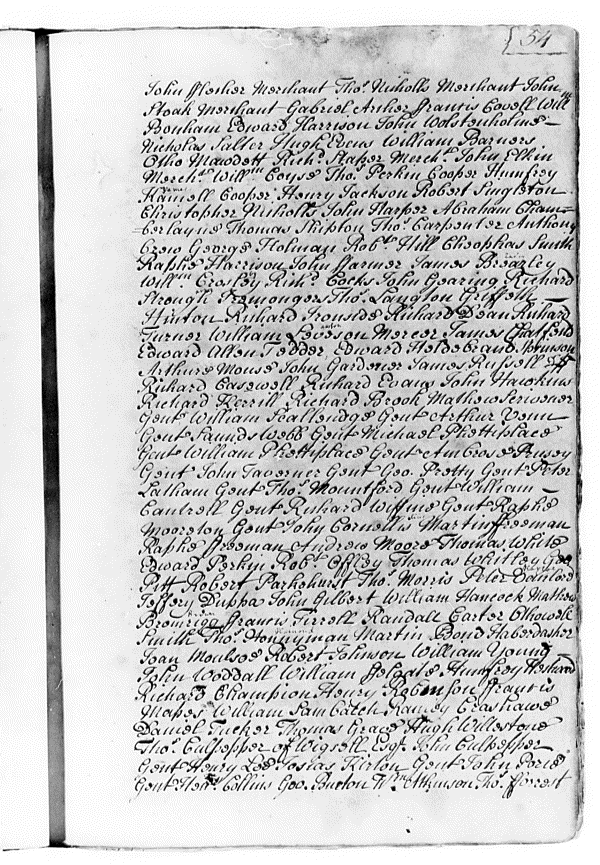
The original records of the members of the Virginia Company (17th century). page 54.

Sir Anthony Forrest of Morborne, Huntingdonshire, was also an investor in the Virginia Company. It is likely that Thomas Forrest, the gentleman colonist, is of the Morborne family. Thomas's birth records are in St Michael's Church, Chesterton, Huntingdonshire, England. His marriage record to Margaret (August 16, 1605) is in the church of St Giles in the Fields, London.

In Benson J. Lossno's "The Marriage of Pocahontas", Lossno writes:

"During the lovely Indian summer time, in the autumn of 1608, there was a marriage on the banks of the Powhatan... History, poetry, and song, have kept a dutiful silence, respecting that first English marriage in America, because John Laydon and Anne Burrows were common people. The bridegroom was a carpenter, among the first adventurers who ascended the Powhatan, then named James in honor of a bad king; and the bride was waiting-maid to "Mistress Forrest," wife of Thomas Forrest, gentleman. These were the first white women ever seen at the Jamestown settlement."

Further research is required as forensic evidence suggests that Thomas was widowed shortly after arriving in Jamestown in 1608 with his wife.

"Documents indicate that the first women at Jamestown were Mistress Forest and her maid Anne Burras, who landed with the Second Supply in 1608. Anne Burras is known to have married John Laydon, and both were listed in the 1625 muster. Mistress Forrest, probably the wife of gentleman Thomas Forrest, is not mentioned again in the historical record, and may have died soon after her arrival at Jamestown."

One would not expect a lady to bring her servant with her, no doubt paying for the crossing, and then to release her from service soon after arriving in the new colony. However, if the lady died, the widower, a gentleman would have no use for a lady's servant and in fact, as far as the research shows to date (2015), Thomas Forrest disappears from the colonial records for at least a decade before he and his now married son show up in Maryland. This suggests that Thomas went back to England, very possibly on the same ship he came over on, having concluded colonial life was better observed from afar. Nevertheless, his name shows up on the Second Charter in May of the next year, suggesting he maintained his enthusiasm for the new colonial venture.

== Thomas Forrest and family in a painting, Baptism of Pocahontas, in the Rotunda of the US Capital Building ==
In February 1837, John Gadsby Chapman received a commission from the United States Congress to paint a historical scene for the rotunda of the Capitol building. For this work, Chapman received a total payment of US$10,000 (equivalent to $284,559 in 2025). On November 30, 1840, Baptism of Pocahontas was formally unveiled in the United States Capitol Rotunda.

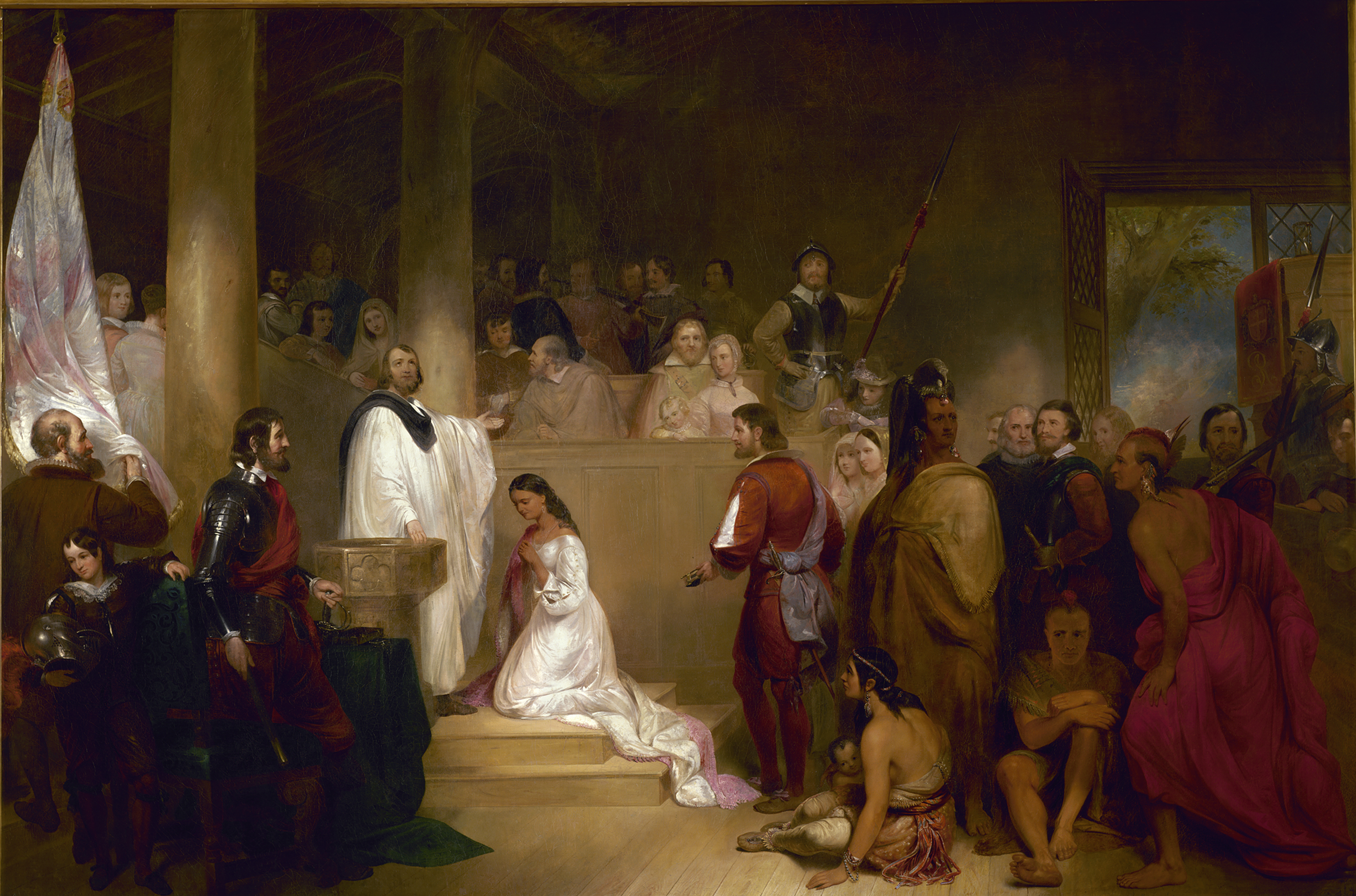
Baptism of Pocahontas, by John Gadsby Chapman, 1840

Prominently featured in the painting, according to a "key" from the Granger Collection, New York City is: "#11. Mr. and Mrs. Forrest, the lady being the first gentlewoman to arrive in the colony", and the painting itself shows a man, woman and young child, presumably their son (although there is no record of Margaret and Thomas having any children, while there is a record of Thomas having a son, Peter born in 1601).

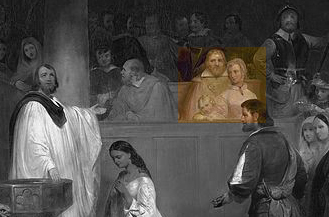
Detail of the painting in the Capitol Rotunda

This key is referenced "At Jamestown VA 1613". It is unlikely this historic painting done over two centuries later reflects the actual history: Mistress Forrest may have died soon after her arrival in Jamestown in 1608, thus would not have been alive to witness a 1613 baptism. Further, the child born in 1601 would not be a toddler 12 years later. Nevertheless, the painting firmly places Thomas Forrest, and perhaps his son Peter, in the rotunda of American History as art, if not fact.
