= Dale's Code =

Legal system of colonial Virginia

For the Colony in Virginea Britannia. Lawes Divine, Morall and Martiall, etc
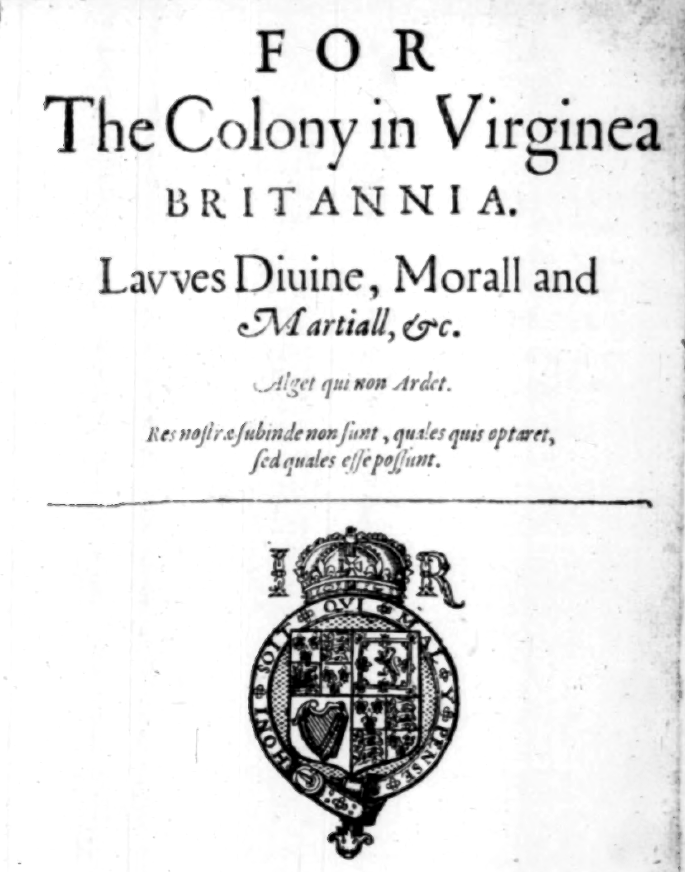
- Title page of Dales Code (Lawes Divine, Morall and Martiall)
- Author: William Strachey (scribe of Thomas Dale)
- Original title: Lawes Divine, Morall, and Martiall
- Language: English
- Publisher: Walter Burre of London
- Publication date: 1612
- Publication place: Kingdom of England
- ISBN: 9780783743691

Lawes Divine, Morall, and Martiall (Note: Full title: Articles, Lawes, and Orders, Divine, Politique, and Martiall for the Colony in Virginea: first established by Sir Thomas Gates Knight, Lieutenant Generall, May 24, 1610. exemplified and approved by the Right Honourable Sir Thomas West Knight, Lord Lawair, Lord Governour and Captaine Generall June 12, 1610. Againe exemplified and enlarged by Sir Thomas Dale Knight, Marshall, and Deputie Governour, June 22. 1611. Later published by William Strachey in London as: For the Colony in Virginea Britannia. Lawes Divine, Morall and Martiall, etc.), colloquially known as Dale's Code, is a governing document enacted in 1610 (then published in 1612) by the Deputy Governor of Virginia Thomas Dale. The code, among other things, created a rather authoritarian system of government for the Colony of Virginia. It established a "single ruling group" that "held tight control of the colony." The word "martial", contained in Dale's Code, refers to the duties of soldiers, while the terms "divine" and "morall" relate to crime and punishment. The code prescribed capital punishment for any colonist who endangered the life of the colony by theft or other crimes.

Two severe punishments under Dale's Code were: an oatmeal-thief was chained to a tree and left to starve; a pregnant Anne Laydon (Anne Burras) was whipped for "sewing shirts too short" and miscarried.

Dale's Code remained in force until c. 1618. The Virginia General Assembly replaced the system. Four centuries later, one scholar came up with a theory that it strongly influenced the justice system for decades afterwards, particularly in the governing and punishment of slaves. In the "Calendar of State Papers Colonial, America and West Indies: Volume 1, 1574-1660," the following unattributed commentary on the code is present:

On 12 May following [1611] arrived Sir Thos. Dale, with three ships, 300 persons, and provisions 'for the most part, such as hogs refused to eat.' He immediately published most tyrannous and cruel laws sent over by Sir Thos. Smythe.
