= Starving Time =

Starvation in 1609–1610 at Jamestown, Virginia

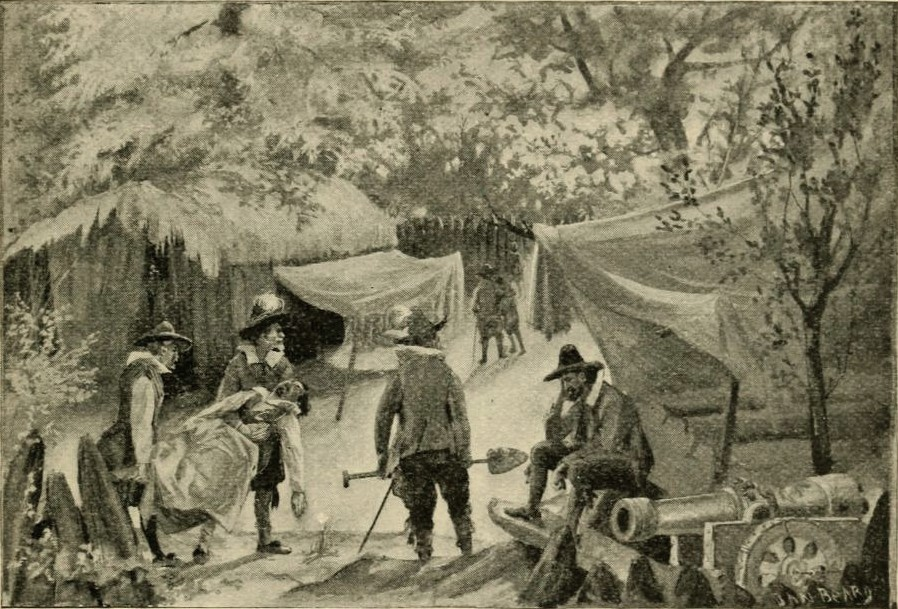
Sickness at Jamestown, circa 1610

The Starving Time at Jamestown in the Colony of Virginia was a period of starvation during the winter of 1609–1610. There were about 500 Jamestown residents at the beginning of the winter; by spring only 61 people remained alive.

The colonists, the first group of whom had originally arrived on May 13, 1607, had never planned to grow all of their own food. Their plans depended upon trade with the local Powhatan to supply them with food between the arrivals of periodic supply ships from England. Lack of access to water and a severe drought crippled the agricultural production of the colonists. The water that the colonists drank was brackish and potable for only half of the year. A fleet from England, damaged by a hurricane, arrived months behind schedule with new colonists but without adequate food supplies.

On June 7, 1610, the survivors boarded ships, abandoned the colony site, and sailed downstream to the Chesapeake Bay. There, another supply convoy with new supplies, headed by newly appointed governor Francis West, intercepted them on the lower James River and returned them to Jamestown. Within a few years, the commercialization of tobacco by John Rolfe secured the settlement's long-term economic prosperity. There is historical and scientific evidence that the settlers at Jamestown had turned to cannibalism during the starving time.

== Dependency upon outside resources ==
The English settlement at Jamestown had been established on May 24, 1607, with the arrival of three ships commanded by Captain Christopher Newport. The initial small group of 104 men and boys chose the location because it was favorable for defensive purposes, but it offered poor hunting prospects and a shortage of drinking water. Although they did some farming, few of the original settlers were accustomed to manual labor or were familiar with farming. Hunting on the island was poor, and they quickly exhausted the supply of small game. The colonists were largely dependent upon trade with the Native Americans and periodic supply ships from England for their food.

A series of incidents with the Native Americans soon developed into serious conflicts, ending any hope of a commercial alliance with them. This forced the settlers into close quarters, behind fortified walls, severely limiting their ability to farm the area and trade with other Indian tribes. Various attempts at farming led to kidnappings and killings by the Powhatans, while expeditions to establish relations with other Native Americans resulted either in the emissaries being ambushed and killed by the Powhatans, or proved fruitless in gaining sufficient supplies. The combination of disease, killings, and kidnapping almost obliterated the initial English population.

== First and second supply trips ==
After dropping off the settlers, and returning to England, Christopher Newport returned to Jamestown in January 1608 from England with what was called the "first supply" and about 100 additional settlers. Upon his return, he found that the effects of the lack of planning and lack of skills among the original colonists had combined with Powhatan attacks in reducing the original settlement to only 38 survivors.

After expanding fortifications, reinforcing shelters, and placing armed men to defend crops from native attacks, Newport felt he had secured the settlement by the end of winter. He sailed for England again in April 1608, returning to Jamestown that October with the "second supply". On board were the colony's first two women—Mistress Forrest and her maid Anne Burras—as well as more supplies and additional settlers, including craftsmen trained to make glass.

== Trading with the indigenous people for food ==
Among the leaders, Captain John Smith had emerged as most capable of successfully trading with the indigenous population. Over the first several months of settlement, the survivors (including Smith) had gained sufficient intelligence of the surrounding tribes to start more focused diplomatic initiatives with Powhatan's enemies. Using the Discovery, the smallest of the three ships which had been left behind for their use, the colonists explored the surrounding area including the Chesapeake Bay. Smith successfully traded for food with the Nansemonds, who were located along the Nansemond River. He had mixed results dealing with the various other tribes, most of whom were affiliated with the Powhatan Confederacy.

With the coming arrival of the supply fleet, Smith felt the colony was sufficiently reinforced to engage the Powhatan directly with a diplomatic initiative aimed at securing at least a temporary respite from sniping, kidnapping, and assaulting. Taking a small escort they made their way through incessant attacks to the capital of the Powhatan Confederacy. During one legendary encounter with the warrior Opechancanough, Smith's life was spared (according to his later account) by the intervention of Pocahontas, the daughter of Chief Powhatan. This event initially proved fortuitous for the English, as Chief Powhatan was obviously unaware of the dire straits of the colony. However, shortly after Newport returned in early January 1608, bringing new colonists and supplies, one of the new colonists accidentally started a fire that leveled all of the colony's living quarters. The fire further deepened the settlement's dependence on the Native Americans for food and revealed to Chief Powhatan the weakness of the English colony. In August 1609, Smith, who had gained the respect of the Powhatans, was injured in a gunpowder accident and had to return to England for medical treatment, leaving on October 4, 1609. With Smith gone, Powhatans stopped trading with the colonists for food.

John Ratcliffe, captain of the Discovery, became colony president and tried to improve the colony's situation by obtaining food. Hoping to emulate Smith, Ratcliffe attempted a trade mission; shortly after being elected, he was captured by Chief Powhatan and tortured to death, leaving the colony without strong leadership. The Powhatans carried out additional attacks on other colonists who came in search of trade. Hunting also became very dangerous, as they killed any Englishmen they found outside of the fort.

== Third supply misfortune ==
The Virginia Company's "third supply" mission was the largest yet, led by the Sea Venture flagship. The Sea Venture was considerably larger than the other eight ships traveling, carrying a large portion of the supplies intended for the Virginia Colony.

The "third supply" to Jamestown with a nine-vessel fleet left London on June 2, 1609. Veteran Captain Christopher Newport commanded the Sea Venture as vice admiral. Also aboard the flagship were the Admiral of the Company, Sir George Somers, Lieutenant-General Sir Thomas Gates, William Strachey and other notable personages in the early history of English colonization in North America.

While crossing the Atlantic Ocean, the convoy transporting 500 new colonists and supplies ran into a severe tropical storm, possibly a hurricane, which lasted for three days. The Sea Venture and one other ship were separated from the seven other vessels of the fleet. Admiral Somers had the Sea Venture deliberately driven onto the reefs of Bermuda to prevent its sinking. The 150 passengers and crew members all landed safely on July 28, but the ship was beyond repair.

In the aftermath of the storm, one ship (the Virginia) returned to England. The other seven ships arrived safely at Jamestown, delivering 200–300 men, women, and children, but relatively few supplies (as most had been aboard the Sea Venture). In the colony, there was no word of the fate of the Sea Venture, its supplies, passengers, or the leaders. Captain Samuel Argall, commanding one of the ships of the third supply which made it to Jamestown, was among those who hurried back to England to advise of Jamestown's plight. However, no further supply ships from England arrived that year nor the following spring of 1610.

== Winter 1609–1610: Hunger and cannibalism ==
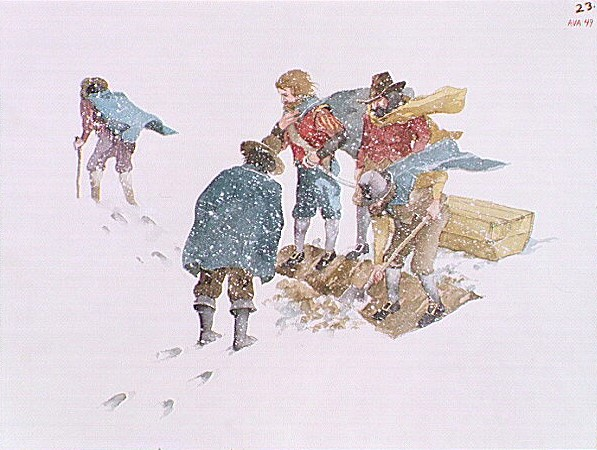
Early colonial burial during a winter storm. This was a common occurrence during the Starving Time in Virginia.

At Jamestown, a drought earlier in 1609 during the normal growing season had left the fields of the colonists of Virginia barren. Combined with the lack of trade with the Native Americans and the failure of the third supply to arrive with expected supplies, the colony found itself with far too little food for the winter. A diet of only maize (corn) results in vitamin deficiency (causing pellagra and scurvy, which likely worsened the reported apathy and despair). With the new arrivals, there were many more mouths to feed. There are few records of the hardships the colonists experienced in Virginia that winter. Arms and valuable work tools were traded to the Powhatans for a pittance in food. Houses were used as firewood. Settlers ate laundry starch intended for gentlemen's fashion. Archaeologists have found evidence that they ate cats, dogs, horses, and rats.

Cannibalism was confirmed in 2013 to have occurred in at least one case; the remains of a teenage girl of about fourteen years were forensically analyzed and shown to have telltale marks consistent with butchering meat. The excavators found the girl's skull and leg bones, together with bones of "butchered horses and dogs" in a "trash deposit" in an underground room that had been used as a kitchen at that time. According to the forensic evidence, cuts made to the skull and bones clearly indicate that brain and edible tissue had been separated from the bones in the same way as with butchered animals, providing "clear evidence of cannibalism." An analysis of the teeth and bones shows that the girl – who was named Jane by the excavators, while her real name is not known – had only recently immigrated, probably from southern England.

That cannibalism had been practiced during the Starving Time had already been known from half a dozen accounts written about the period. George Percy, who had been president of the city council during the crisis, later reported "that the living dug up and ate corpses, and that a husband killed his wife and then butchered her, preserved her with salt, and ate parts of her before he was caught." The husband was executed. That a woman was murdered and eaten by her husband is confirmed by four other accounts of the famine time. A further account does not mention her but states that dead settlers, as well as one Native American who had died in a fight, were eaten.

It is possible that Jane was the murdered wife – she was young, but, according to the customs of the time, not necessarily too young to be married. However, based on her age, her diet, and the fact that she had apparently arrived only a short time before, the archaeologists who studied the case conclude that she might rather have been "a maidservant for a gentlemen's household" – her diet was not as good as typical for upper-class people, but better than usual for the lower classes. Jane's cause of death is unknown. There are no traces of violence preceding her death, but she could have been murdered in a way that left no traces on the (relatively few) bones that have been found, or she might have died of hunger or illness.

== Springtime Deliverance ==
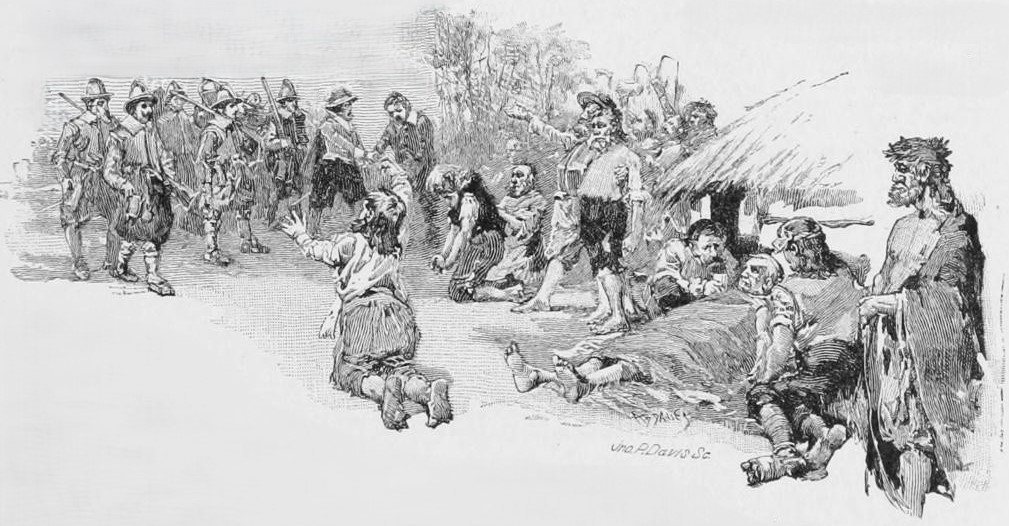
Thomas Gates reaches Jamestown during Starving Time, 1610

On Bermuda, the survivors of the Sea Venture spent nine months building two smaller ships, Deliverance and Patience, from Bermuda cedar and materials salvaged from the Sea Venture. Then, leaving two men to maintain England's claim to the archipelago, the remainder sailed to Jamestown, finally arriving on May 23, 1610.

Led by Gates and Somers, the castaways assumed they would find a thriving colony in Virginia. Instead, they found the colony in ruins and practically abandoned. Of the 500 colonists living in Jamestown in the autumn, they found 60 survivors with many of those sick or dying. Worse yet, many supplies intended for Jamestown had been lost in the shipwreck at Bermuda, and Gates and Somers had brought along with them only a small food supply.

Viewing the fort, we found the palisades torn down, the ports open, the gates from off the hinges, and the empty houses (which owners had taken from them) rent up and burnt, rather than the dwellers would step into the woods a stone's cast off from them to fetch other firewood. And it is true, the Indians killed as fast without, if our men stirred but beyond the bounds of their blockhouse, ...

— William Strachey

It was decided to abandon the colony. On June 7, everyone was placed aboard the ships to return to England, and they began to sail down the James River.

During the period that the Sea Venture suffered its misfortune, and its survivors were struggling in Bermuda to continue on to Virginia, back in England the publication of Captain John Smith's books of his adventures in Virginia sparked a resurgence of interest in the colony. This helped lead to new interest and investment in the Virginia Company. There was also a moral call in England by clergymen and others for support for the stranded colonists. On April 1, 1610, three more ships were dispatched from England bound for Jamestown, equipped with additional colonists, a doctor, food, and supplies. Heading this group was the new governor, Thomas West, Baron De La Warr, better known in modern times as "Lord Delaware".

Governor West and his party arrived on the James River on June 9, just as the Deliverance and Patience were sailing downriver to leave Virginia. Intercepting them about 10 miles downstream from Jamestown near Mulberry Island, West forced the Deliverance and Patience to return to the abandoned colony. This was not a popular decision at the time, but Lord Delaware was to prove a new kind of leader for Virginia.

== Future of the colony ==
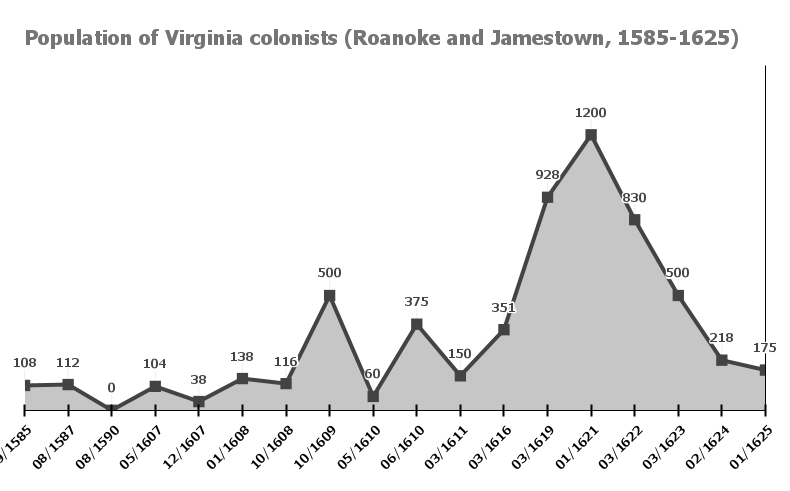
Population chart of Virginia, including Roanoke Colony and Jamestown numbers

Among the survivors of the Sea Venture who arrived at Jamestown in May 1610, and were turned back by Lord Delaware, was a young Englishman named John Rolfe. His wife and young daughter had perished during the journey and delay at Bermuda. Rolfe was the individual most responsible for turning the failing economy of the young colony around.

Rolfe, a businessman from London, had planned to become a planter upon arrival in Virginia, and he had some new ideas about exporting tobacco for profit. He knew that the native tobacco from Virginia was not liked by the English settlers nor did it appeal to the market in England. However, he brought with him some seeds for several new strains of tobacco to experiment with. Using the sweeter strains, Rolfe is credited with being the first to commercially cultivate Nicotiana tabacum plants in North America in 1611; the export of this sweeter tobacco beginning in 1612 helped turn the Virginia Colony into a profitable venture. Soon, Rolfe and others were exporting substantial quantities of the new cash crop. Plantations began growing up all along the James River, from the mouth at Hampton Roads all the way west to Henricus, and on both sides of the river, where export shipments could use wharves to ship the product.

Rolfe became prominent and wealthy and soon held an interest in several plantations, including a large farm on Mulberry Island. Rolfe is said to have founded Varina Farms near Sir Thomas Dale's progressive new city of Henricus, and in 1614 he married Chief Powhatan's daughter Pocahontas, who had converted to Christianity and taken the name Rebecca. The couple had one son named Thomas Rolfe, who was born in 1615.

== Aftermath ==
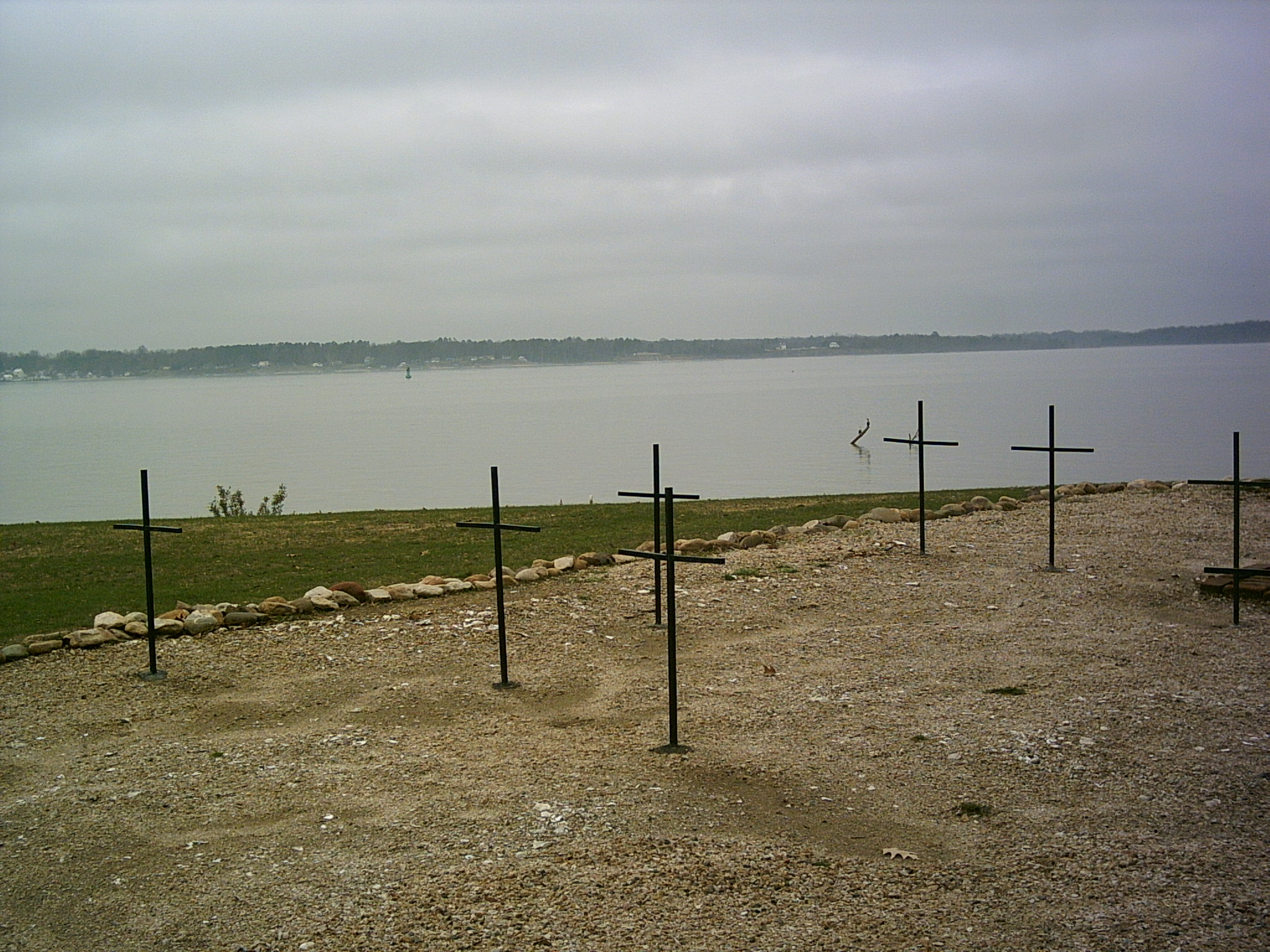
Graves at Historic Jamestowne

The arrival of Lord Delaware with a substantial armed force of pilgrims filled with patriotic fervor spreading Protestantism, resulted in a counter-offensive against the Powhatan Confederacy. The campaign ended the Powhatan siege and resulted in the marriage of Pocahontas and John Rolfe which introduced a short period of truce between the English and the Powhatan Confederacy. Although the truce was a short one, it allowed the English to fully secure the colony's fortifications and housing, expand its farming, develop a network of alliances with other Native American nations, and establish a series of outlying smaller settlements. The Powhatan Confederacy attempted two other wars against the English, including the Second Powhatan War which was initiated by the Massacre of 1622 and the Third Powhatan War which broke out as a result of another surprise massacre of the colony's women and children. However, each attack was met with stiff resistance, a counter-offensive, severe reprisals, and eventual defeat of the Powhatan Confederacy. After almost 40 years of tenuous existence surrounded by a generally hostile Native American nation, the Virginia Colony effectively devastated the Powhatan nation and broke up the confederacy by 1646.

Through the descendants of Rolfe, many of the First Families of Virginia almost 400 years later trace their lineage to both the Native Americans of the Powhatan Confederacy and the English-born settlers of Jamestown. With tobacco as a successful export crop, the financial future and permanency of the Virginia Colony was secured.
