= Mistress Forrest =

Early Virginia colonist

Margaret Forrest
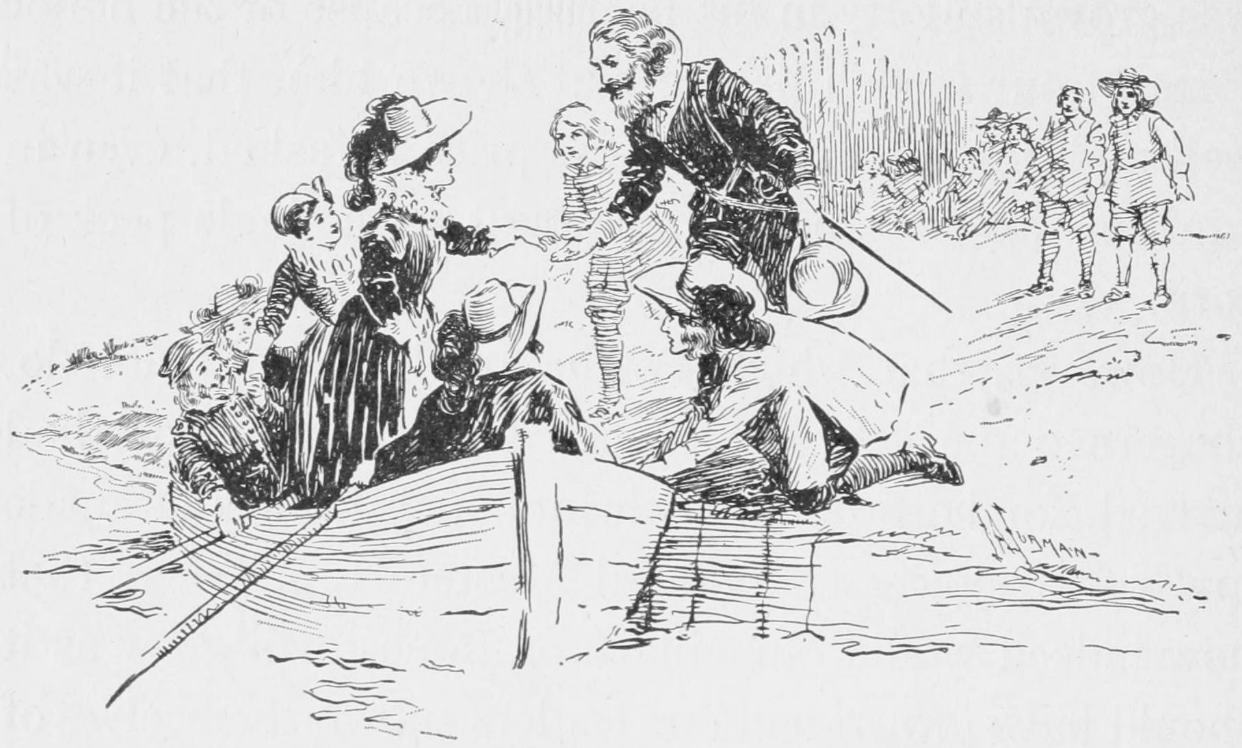
- Conjectural sketch of Mistress Forrest and Anne Burras arrival in Jamestown, Virginia (1608)
- Born: Margaret Foxe
- Died: 1608 (aged 34–35); Jamestown, Virginia Colony
- Other names: Lucy Forrest, Margaret Fox, Foxxe, Forest
- Known for: First lady in Jamestown
- Spouse: Thomas Forrest (presumed)

Margaret Forrest (née Foxe, known as "Mistress Forrest") and her maid servant Anne Burras, were the first two European women to emigrate to the Virginia Colony.

Arriving on October 1, 1608, in what is known as the Second Supply aboard the English ship the Mary and Margaret under Captain Christopher Newport to resupply the colony at Jamestown, Virginia. Her assumed husband or relative, Thomas Forrest, Esquire, was listed as a gentleman on that ship as shown on its manifest, whereas she was listed only as Mistress Forrest. Thomas and Margaret had married on August 16, 1605, in St. Giles in the Fields, London, England.

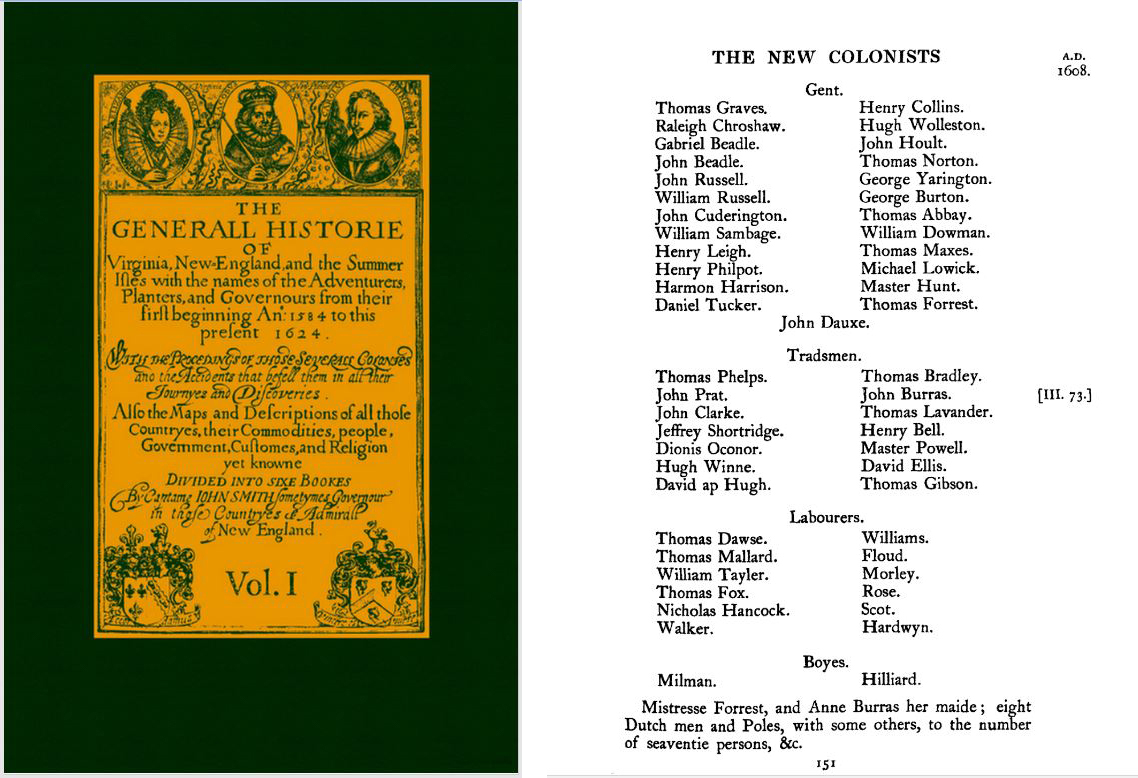
Passenger list of the second supply to Jamestown

Mistress Forrest, probably the wife of gentleman Thomas Forrest, is not mentioned again in the historical record.

In 1997, a skeleton within a gabled coffin was found within the walls of James Fort, which is believed to be Margaret Forrest. The remains of the skeleton assert that Forrest was about 35 years old, about 4.67 feet (1.42 m) tall (4 feet 8 inches), and died within the first years of Jamestown.
