= Anne Burras =

Early Virginia colonist (c. 1595–after 1625)

Anne Burras Laydon
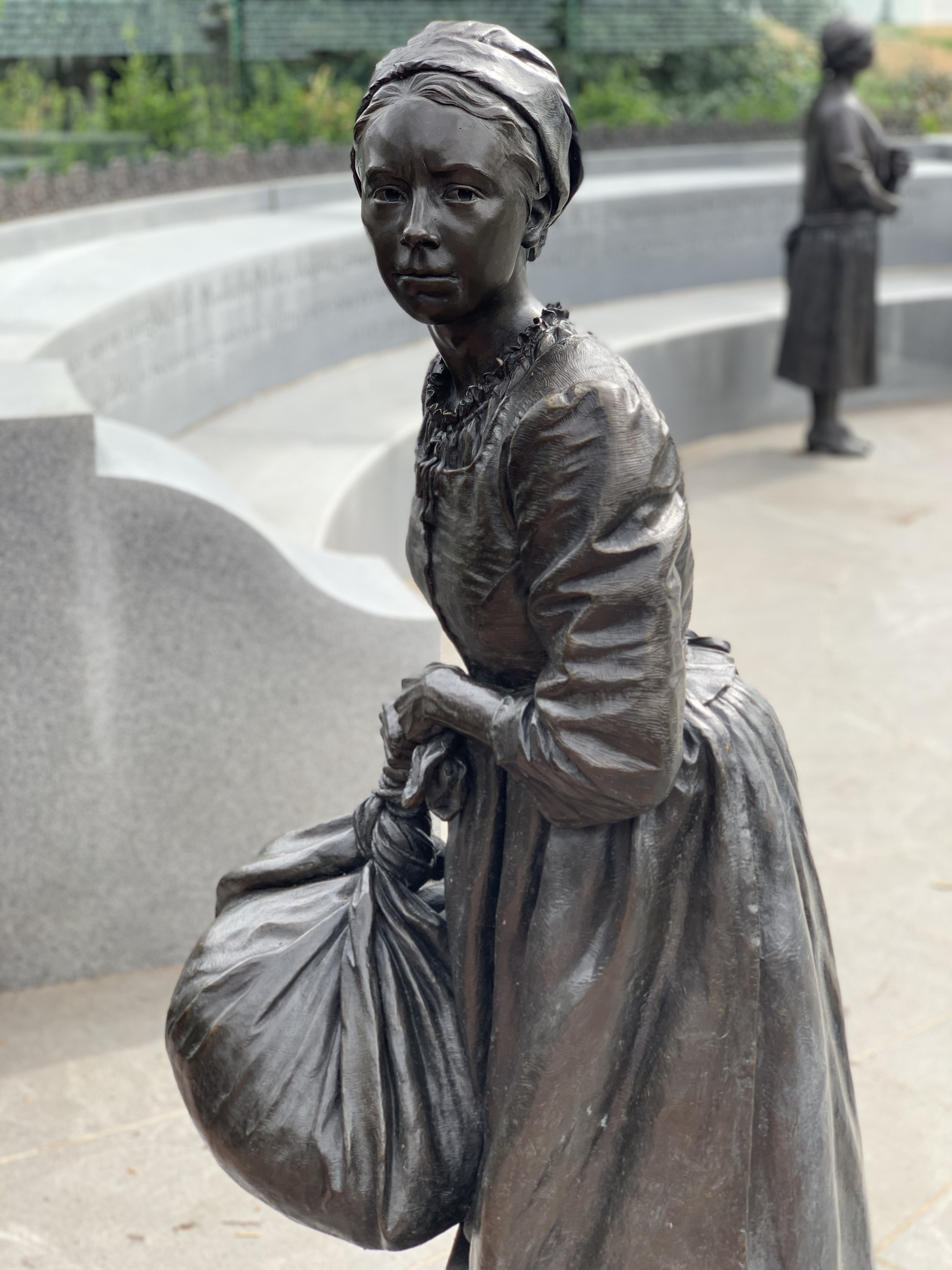
- Statue of Anne Burras included in the Virginia Women's Monument
- Born: Anne Burras c. 1595
- Died: after 1625
- Other names: Ann Burras, Anne Leyden, Layton, Anna Burrowes
- Occupations: Maid (lady-in-waiting) to Mistress Forrest later seamstress
- Known for: First girl in Jamestown, Virginia colony First English marriage in Virginia
- Spouse: John Laydon (1608)
- Children: Virginia Laydon, Alice, Katherine, and Margaret

Anne Burras, later known as Anne Laydon, was an early English settler in Virginia and an ancient planter. She was the first English woman to marry in the New World, and her daughter Virginia Laydon was the first child of English colonists to be born in the Jamestown, Virginia, colony. Anne Burras arrived in Jamestown on October 1, 1608, on the Mary and Margaret, the ship bringing the Second Supply. She came as a 14-year-old maid (similar to a lady-in-waiting) to Mistress Forrest.

In December 1608, Anne married carpenter John Laydon (or Layton, Leyden), aged 28 years (b. 1580). John Laydon had arrived with the original colonists to Virginia in 1607.

In 1610, Anne worked as a seamstress for the colony. During the strict regime enacted by Dale's Code, she was whipped brutally for "sewing shirts too short", a punishment which caused a miscarriage.

The Laydons had four daughters, Virginia, Alice, Katherine, and Margaret. All six members of the Laydon family were listed in the muster of February 1624–1625. According to the muster, Anne was 30 years of age when the muster was taken. All four children are listed as born in Virginia; their ages are not given.

John Laydon was shown as having 200 acres in Henrico in May, 1625. However, the 1624–1625 muster shows the family living in Elizabeth City. A patent to "John Leyden, Ancient Planter", dated December 2, 1628, refers to 100 acres on the east side of Blunt Point Creek, "land now in tenure of Anthony Burrowes and William Harris, and said land being in lieu of 100 acres in the Island of Henrico".

No proof has been found of the marriage of any of the four daughters, though it has been suggested, on the basis of land records, that one daughter may have married John Hewitt or Howitt.
