= Timeline of Jamestown =

This is a timeline of events related to the establishment of Jamestown, which today is located the U.S. state of Virginia. Dates below use the Old Style calendar (e.g., the settlement naming occurred 4 May 1607 [O.S. 14 May 1607]).

== Before 1606 ==
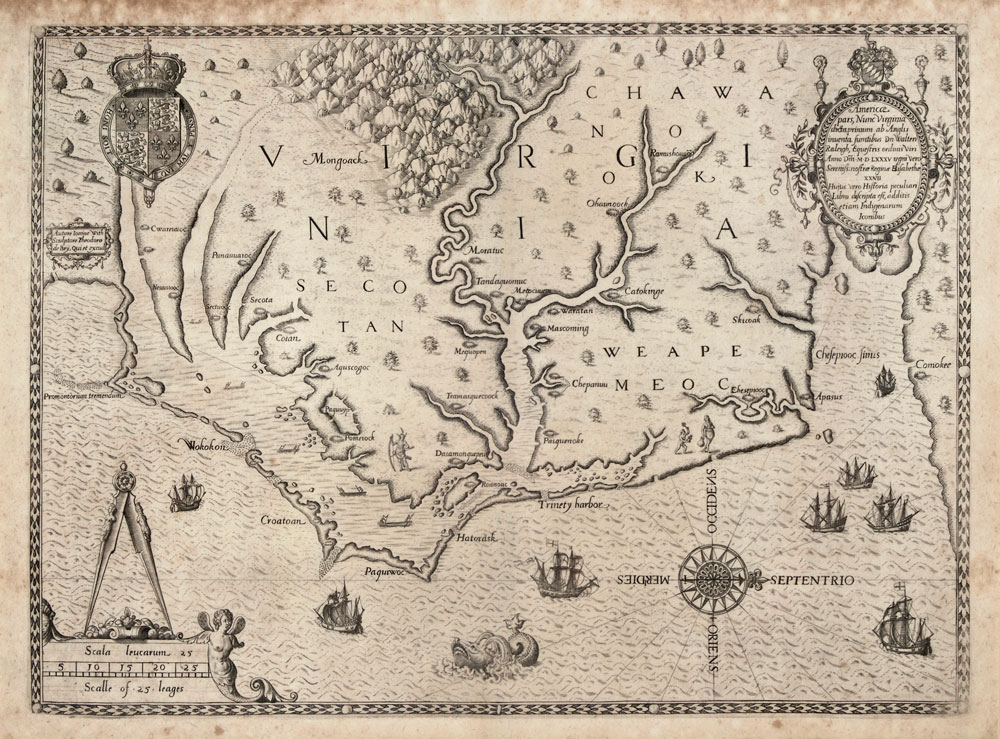
Chart of the coast of "Virginia" (including North Carolina) c. 1585-1586. Engraving by Theodor de Bry based on John White's designs

- June 1561: Native Virginian Paquiquineo was kidnapped by the crew of the Spanish caravel Santa Catalina in Chesapeake Bay. Some historians believe Paquiquineo and Opechancanough are the same individual.
- September 8, 1565: The Spanish Empire settled in St. Augustine, Florida and annexed parts of the Outer Banks, calling the region north to Delaware Bay "La Florida".
- c. Feb 1571: Paquiquineo, now christened as "Don Luís de Velasco", slayed eight Jesuit missionaries attempting to set up Ajacán Mission, somewhere on the Virginia Peninsula.
- c. 1585: Walter Raleigh was granted a charter by Queen Elizabeth I, naming the North American coast "Virginia" in tribute to her. This led to the establishment of a colony on Roanoke Island with 108 men.
- August 18, 1590: John White and the Watts' expedition men discovered the Roanoke Colony abandoned.
- May – June 1602: Captain Bartholomew Gosnold, Captain Bartholomew Gilbert, Captain Gabriel Archer and others explored the New World coast with the intention of starting a colony, but occupied Cuttyhunk Island for only a few weeks before returning to England.
- March 24, 1603: Queen Elizabeth I dies. James VI of Scotland becomes King James I of England.
- c. 1605: Chesapeake people were slain on the orders of Powhatan (Native American leader).

== 1606 ==
- April 10, 1606: Virginia Company of London was formed by Bartholomew Gosnold from a charter from King James I of England, with plans to create a proprietary colony in "Virginia" (which describes a coastline that is now known as Carolinas and north to New England).
- 1606–1612: Eastern Virginia and the Tidewater region experienced a severe six-year-long drought, affecting colonists and natives alike.
- December 20, 1606: 105 to 108 men and boys (with 39 crew) boarded ships Susan Constant, Discovery, and the Godspeed in Blackwall, London, set for the colonization of Virginia.

== 1607 ==
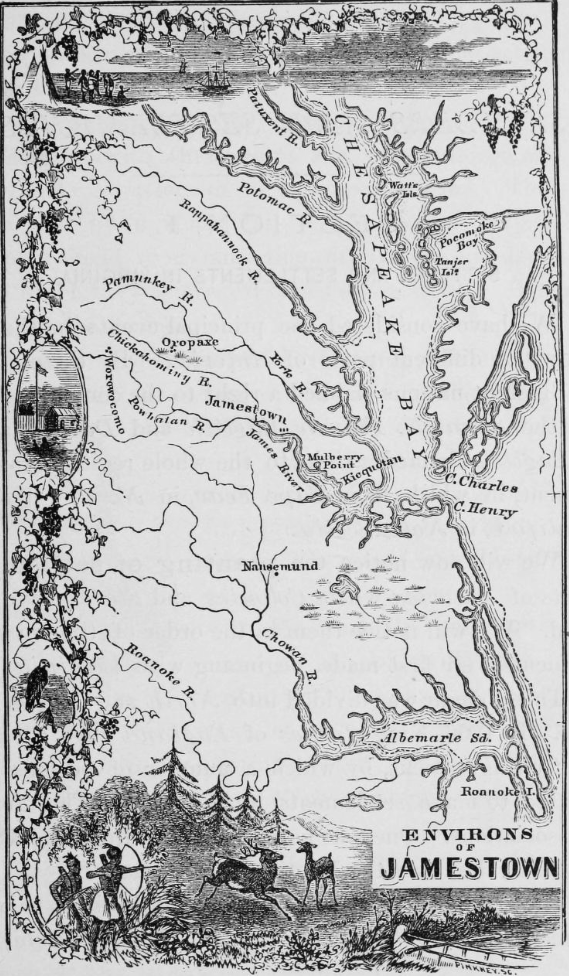
Environs of Jamestown

- c. 1607: Chief Powhatan inherited Powhatan Confederacy of tribes with political domain over much of eastern Tidewater Virginia (Tsenacommacah).
- February 13, 1607: Near the Canary Islands, John Smith was charged with plotting a mutiny by Captain Christopher Newport.
- March 28, 1607: John Smith was spared from execution by hanging by the Reverend Robert Hunt and Bartholomew Gosnold, but was kept as a prisoner.
- April 26, 1607: First landing of the English settlers occurred at Cape Henry.
- May 4, 1607: Fleet met Rappahannock people and visited a Paspahegh native village where the colonists were entertained.
- May 8, 1607: Fleet encountered Appomattoc native up the James River.
- May 12, 1607: Archer's Hope was explored as a potential settlement site.
- c. May 1607: Settlers deposited three pigs on Hog Island for safekeeping.
- May 14, 1607: Jamestown Island was selected (by decree of Edward Maria Wingfield) as the settlement site. The settlement was named "James His Towne" in tribute to James I of England.
- c. May 14, 1607: Virginia Company instructions were unsealed to identify the pre-determined Council Members of the settlement: Edward Maria Wingfield (president), Bartholomew Gosnold, John Martin, John Ratcliffe, George Kendall, Christopher Newport (ex officio), and John Smith. Smith was denied a council membership by the president.
- May 18, 1607: A party of 100 Paspahegh attempted to fight the colonists.
- May 21, 1607: Christopher Newport, Gabriel Archer, and other explorers visited the Weanock native people.
- May 23, 1607: Newport and explorers met Parahunt "Tanx" Powhatan (son of Powhatan).

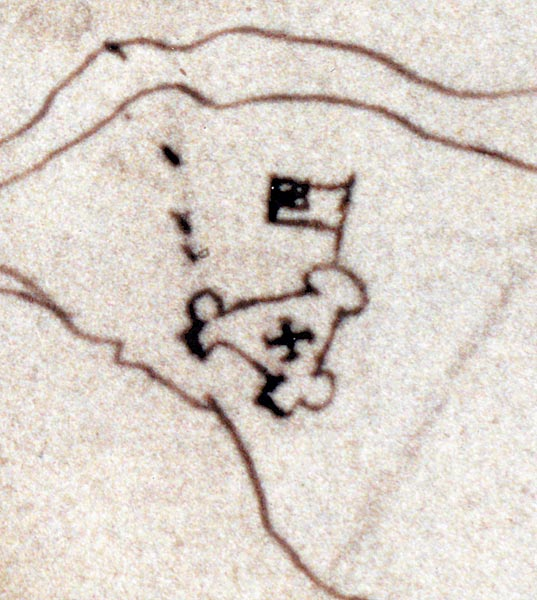
Sketch of James Fort, from the Zuniga map

- June 15, 1607: Initial construction of James Fort was concluded.
- c. June 1607: Sometime before setting sail, Christopher Newport convinced leaders to free John Smith and appoint Smith to the council.
- June 22, 1607: Newport sailed for England in the Susan Constant (with cargo of fool's gold and dirt (to test for precious metals)), leaving the Discovery and reassembled shallops (or barges) for the colonists to use in the rivers and bays.
- c. June 22, 1607: Jamestown colonists began to succumb to disease due to non-potable water and mosquito-borne illnesses.
- c. June 22, 1607: Chief Powhatan sent corn and venison to the malnourished Jamestown settlers.
- c. August 1607: About 100 Englishmen arrived to settle in Popham Colony (present day Maine).
- August 12, 1607: The Susan Constant (with Newport) arrived back in London, England.
- August 22, 1607: Bartholomew Gosnold died.
- September 10, 1607: Council President Edward Maria Wingfield was deposed/impeached and arrested for allegedly hoarding food. John Ratcliffe became president. George Kendall was imprisoned for mutiny, and held on the Discovery.
- December 10, 1607: John Smith took nine men on a shallop to explore and find food up the Chickahominy River. George Cassen was captured and tortured to death.
- December 1607: John Smith was taken by Opechancanough to Werowocomoco, either to be inducted as a ceremonial tribe member or to be executed. Pocahantas participated.

== 1608 ==
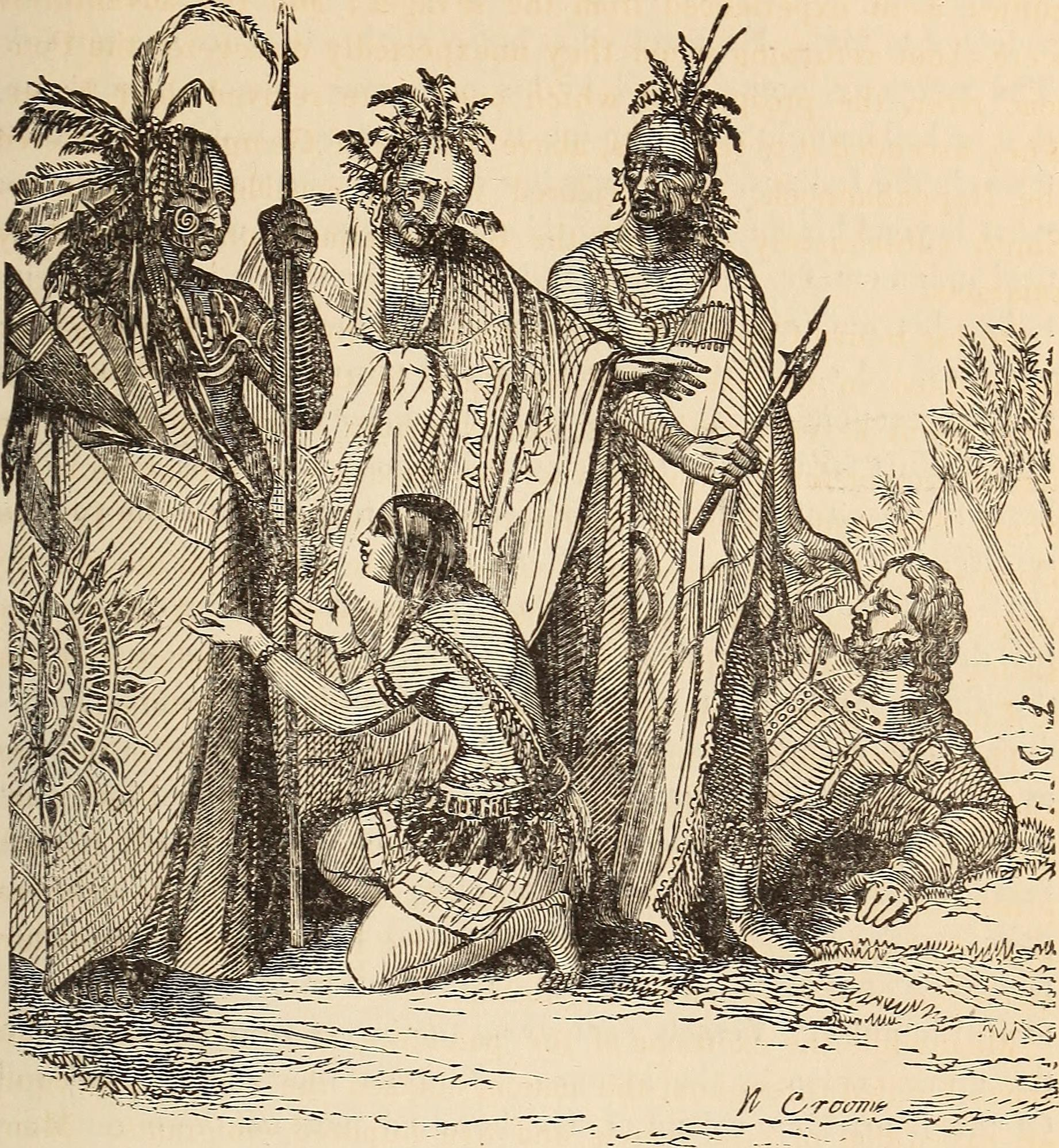
Illustration of Powhatans, Pocahontas, and John Smith

- c. January 1608: Only 38 to 40 colonists were alive. Ratcliffe and the Council planned to return to England on Discovery.
- c. January 5, 1608: John Smith used a compass to confound Opecanchanough and his hunting party, avoiding death.
- c. January 1608: John Smith returned to Jamestown from his encounter with Powhatan.
- c. January 1608: President John Ratcliffe held John Smith responsible for the deaths of two English explorers, and sentenced him to death by hanging.
- January 2, 1608: Newport and the "first supply" mission ship, the John and Francis, arrived in Jamestown (containing 80 to 100 passengers). Newport overturned Smith's death sentence.
- January 7, 1608: At James Fort, a major fire occurred through carelessness, burning down most wattle shelters and the food storehouse. Colonists had to live in the ruins to overwinter.
- February 1608: Newport and Smith traded with Powhatan. Thomas Savage (a teenaged boy) was sent to live with natives; while Namontack (a page to Powhatan) was sent to live with English.
- April 1608: Presumed lost at sea, the Phoenix, a supply ship captained by Francis Nelson, arrives in Virginia; carrying 20-40 passengers
- April 10, 1608: Newport sailed for England with the John and Francis.
- May 21, 1608: Newport arrived back in England.
- June 2, 1608 – July 22, 1608: John Smith explored Chesapeake Bay and rivers to find food and passage to the Pacific Ocean.
- June 2, 1608: The Phoenix departs Virginia with writings and maps from John Smith.
- June 8–10, 1608: At Roaring Point, natives attempted to repel Smith and English explorers with archers waiting on the shore. The next evening, Smith came ashore and left a basket of trade goods. Eventually, four Nanticoke men unaware of the situation met with Smith and spread the word that he did not wish to attack. Hundreds of native people came to talk and trade.
- June 17, 1608: At Nomini Bay, two native men invited Smith's shallop crew to go up the creek. They were led into an ambush. However, gunfire disarmed the natives, and ceasing fire, they exchanged hostages. The weroance explained that Mamanatowick Powhatan had ordered the ambush.
- c. June 18 to July 16, 1608: Smith's exploration in the shallop continued, with charting of the Potomac River and towns along the way. The explorers met a Wicocomico man named "Mosco". Smith guessed that he is partly of European descent due to facial hair. Mosco guided the English along a portion of the Potomac.
- July 17, 1608: Smith was wounded by stingray near the mouth of the Rappahannock River. He was treated by a doctor and survived. The area was named Stingray Point.
- July 18–21, 1608: Smith's shallop returned to Jamestown.
- July 1608: John Ratcliffe left office (either by resignation or deposition) in July 1608, two months before the end of his term.
- Sept 10, 1608: John Smith was elected to serve a one-year term as president of the council. His term ended on September 10, 1609.
- July 24, 1608 – September 27, 1608: Smith's second exploration of Chesapeake Bay and rivers to find food and passage to the Pacific Ocean. Matthew Scrivener was in command in Jamestown while Smith was gone.
- c. October 1, 1608: Newport and the "second supply" mission ship (the Mary and Margaret) arrived in Jamestown, adding about 70 settlers to the colony. Included were Jamestown Polish craftsmen, "Dutch" (German) carpenters and glassmakers, and two English women: Mistress Margaret Fox Forrest and Anne Burras.
- c. 1608: Printing of John Smith's True Relation of Virginia in London, England.
- c. October 1608: Captain Newport, John Smith, and armed men met with Powhatan (Wahunsenacawh) to bestow gifts such as a scarlet cloak and a feather mattress. Included was a coronation ceremony (using a metal crown with fake jewels, which attempted to make Wahunsenacawh a vassal of King James I.
- c. 1608: Hog Island contained a drove of 60 pigs, which went unused by colonists.
- c. Autumn of 1608: Jamestown Glasshouse was built by German glassmakers.
- November 1608: Jamestown's first wedding (of two English): Anne Burras married John Laydon, a carpenter.
- December 1, 1608: George Kendall was executed for treason.

== 1609 ==
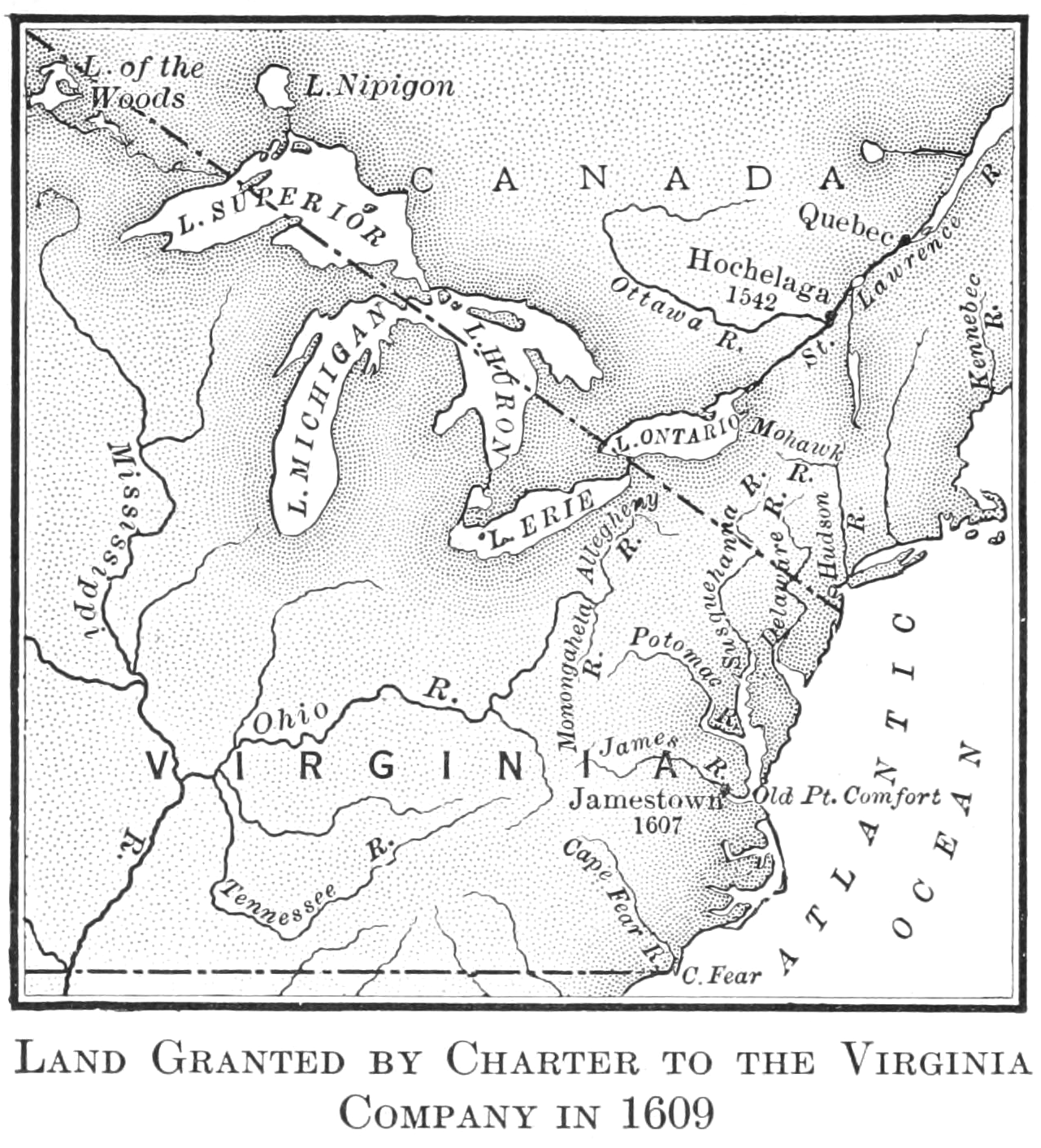
Second Virginia Charter

- January 7, 1609: Matthew Scrivener drowned in the James River, near Hog Island.
- c. Springtime of 1609: John Smith decreed, "He who does not work, neither shall he eat".
- June 2, 1609: Newport, George Somers and the "third supply" ships (Sea Venture, Diamond, Faulcon, Blessinge, Unitie, Lion, Swallow, Virginia, and Catch (ketch)) formed a flotilla and departed from England.

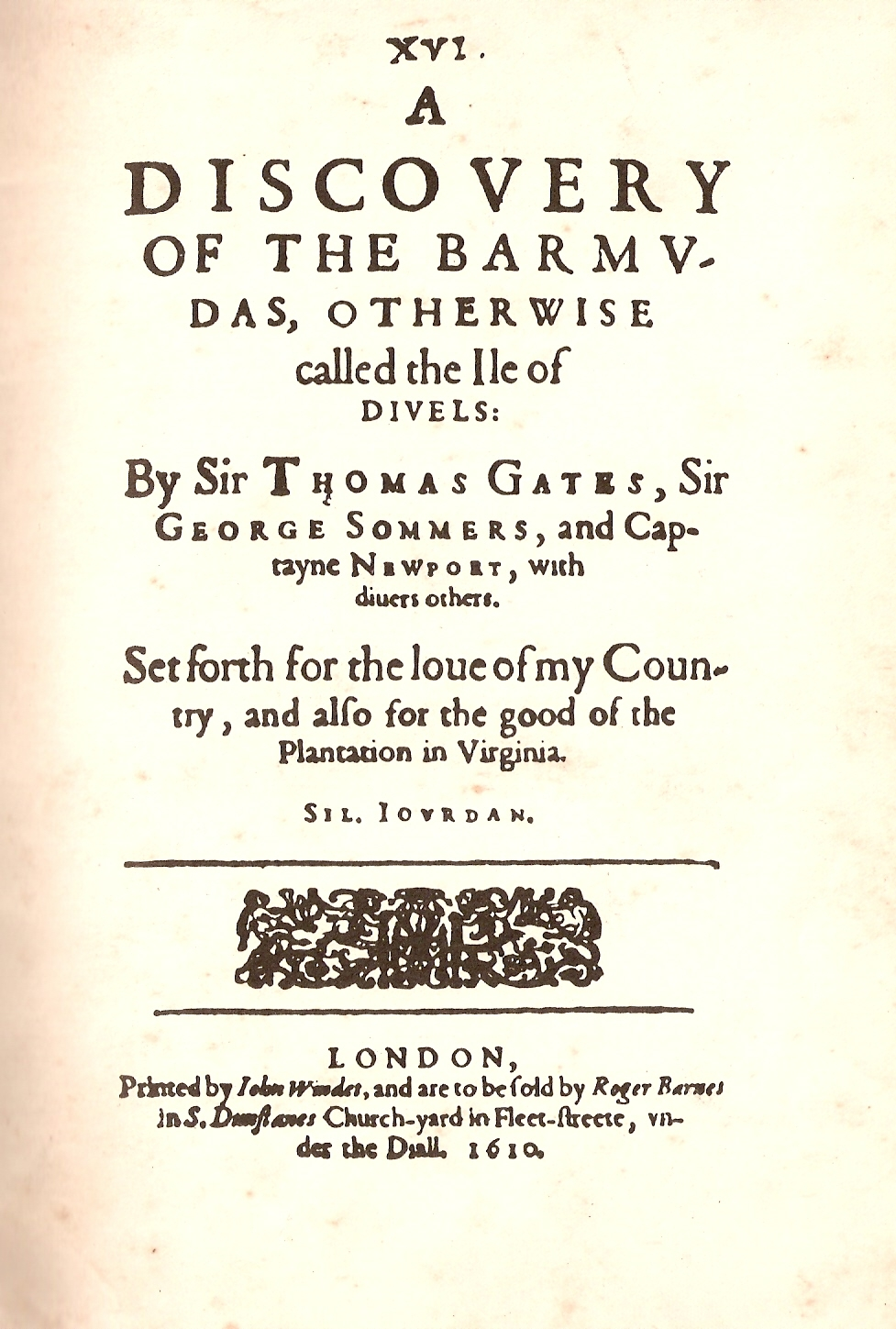
Pamphlet, A Discovery of the Barmudas, otherwise called the Ile of Divels by Silvester Jourdain

- June 1609: Samuel Argall departed from England for Virginia, attempting a more northerly, more direct route via Bermuda.
- c. July 1609: In the Chesapeake Bay, Spanish reconnaissance ship, La Asunción de Cristo, was driven off by the timely arrival of Mary and John (captained by Samuel Argall), preventing the Spanish Empire from discovering a weakened Jamestown. Pedro de Zúñiga y de la Cueva, the Spanish ambassador to England, was desperately seeking the location in order to authorize an attack by Philip III of Spain.
- July 24, 1609: A tropical storm (likely a hurricane) hit the supply mission flotilla, separating ships and delaying the resupply.
- July 28, 1609: The Sea Venture was shipwrecked near Gates' Bay, St. George's Island, Bermuda. The 150 Virginia-bound people became castaways on the uncolonized island, dubbed "Virginiola".
- c. Summer of 1609: In Bermuda, Stephen Hopkins was accused of mutiny for wanting to remain a Bermuda colonist, arguing the Virginia Company contract voided by shipwreck.
- c. Fall of 1609: Fort Algernon was built nearby Jamestown.
- c. October 1609: John Smith was severely wounded by a gunpowder accident, and had to return to England for proper treatment. The Faulcon, Unitie, Blessinge, and Lion departed from Virginia, while the Swallow and Virginia (pinnace) remained behind.
- c. October 1609: Master George Percy took over as president of the governing council.
- October 4, 1609: Seven of the nine ships of the "third supply" mission arrived, delivering approximately 350 colonists but little supply. Four of the ships harbored sufferers of yellow fever, while the Diamond and Unity brought bubonic plague to the colony, killing at least 30 emigrants on the journey (and more over the following months).
- c. November 1609: Henry Spelman of Jamestown, a teenage boy, was sent to live with Powhatan as a translator and ambassador.
- c. November 1609: After trading for corn with Powhatan confederacy natives, John Ratcliffe was stripped naked, flayed, and burned at the stake.
- c. November 1609: Powhatan natives attacked and killed several settlers, and destroyed the stock of pigs on Hog Island.
- c. November 1609: Captain and Councillor Francis West took the Swallow to trade with Patawomeck people. West killed several natives and stole food, but set sail for England to avoid mutiny by his crew.
- c. November 1609 – June 1610: Starving Time began in the winter, killing many.
- c. Winter of 1609 – 10: Gabriel Archer died.

== 1610 ==
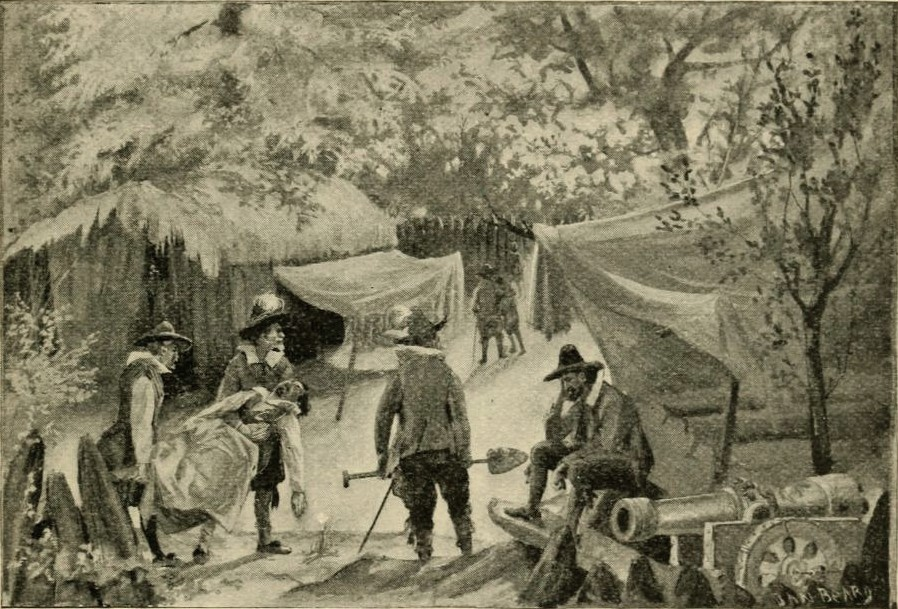
Sickness at Jamestown, circa 1610

- February 1610: In the Somers Isles, Bermuda Rolfe (baby girl) was born to John Rolfe and Mistress Sarah Hacker Rolfe, but soon perished.
- February 1610: In the Somers Isles, Bermudas Eason (baby boy) was born to Edward Eason and his wife.
- March 1610: About 60 out of 500–600 colonists remained alive. Francis West and 36 men were not counted as they had absconded to England.
- May 10, 1610: In the Somers Isles, Thomas Gates, Newport, Somers, and other castaway-colonists (totaling 137) boarded the Deliverance and Patience to sail to Jamestown. Two sailors (Christopher Carter and Edward-Robert Waters) remained behind on Bermuda.

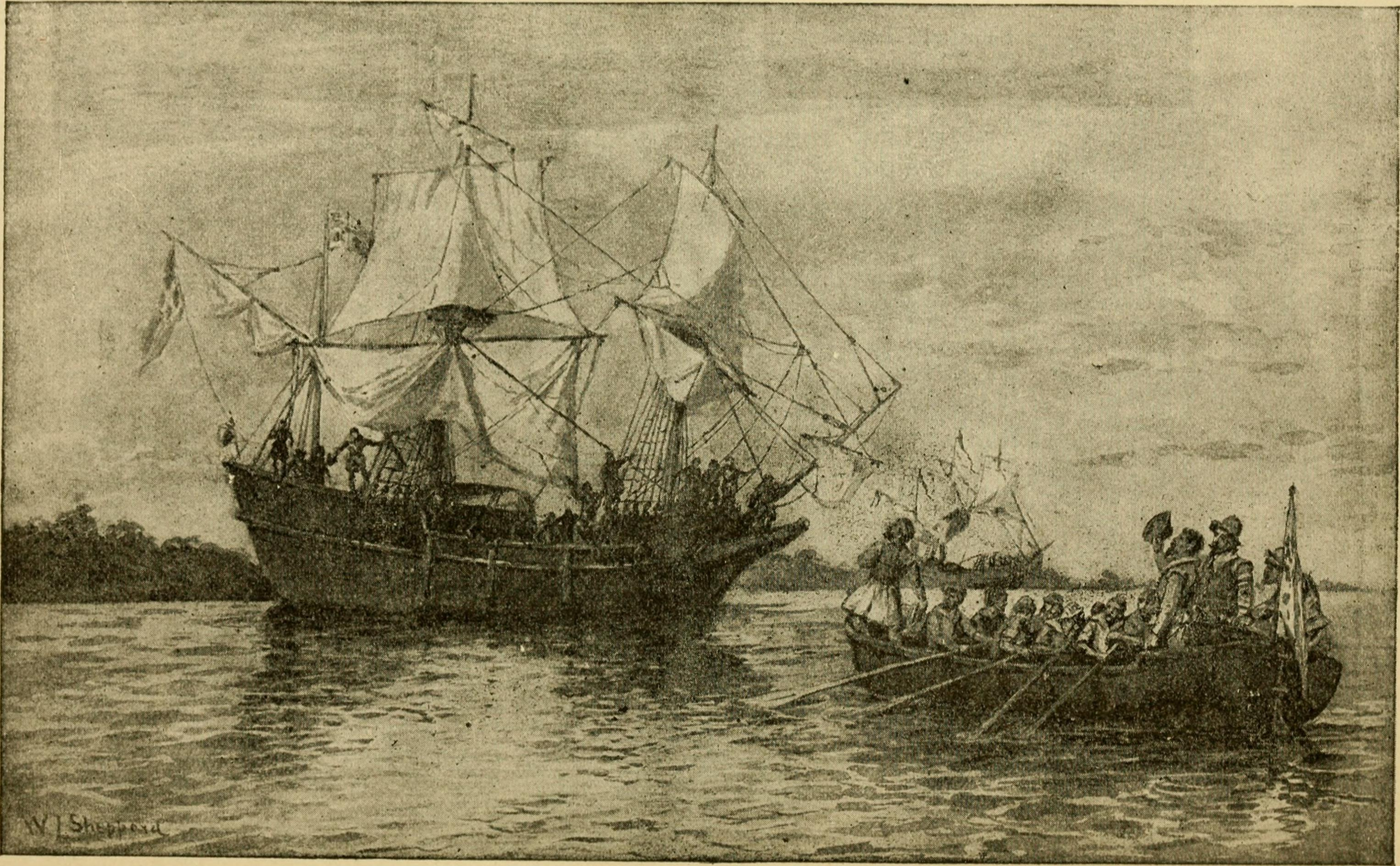
Lord De La Warr's flotilla intercepted the English refugees abandoning the Jamestown colony, June 1610

- May 23, 1610: Deliverance and Patience (with castaway-colonists) arrived from Bermuda in Virginia expecting 500-600 settlers, but found only the 60 colonists remaining.
- May 24, 1610: Thomas Gates and Thomas Dale issued Lawes Divine, Morall and Martiall [sic], also known as "Dale's Code", a martial law/authoritarian system of government.
- June 7, 1610: Thomas Gates and leaders decided to abandon Jamestown. Colonists planned to head north to Newfoundland fishing settlements for food and evacuation.
- June 8, 1610: Jamestown refugees met the supply ships of Thomas West, Lord De La Warr at Mulberry Island. Thomas West convinced the colonists to return to Jamestown with fresh supplies and healthy men.
- July 9, 1610: St. John's Episcopal Church (Hampton, Virginia) was founded on Cape Henry.
- August 9, 1610: De la Warr sent Percy with 70 colonists to attack the Paspahegh and Chickahominy villages, burning buildings, destroying crops, and killing up to 75 natives. This ignited the first of the Anglo-Powhatan Wars.
- June 19, 1610: George Somers and Samuel Argall sailed for Bermuda to gather wild hogs for Jamestown.
- July 20, 1610: Christopher Newport and Thomas Gates left Virginia (on the Blessinge and Hercules) for England, where he would use his story of the Sea Venture wreck to advocate for the colony and to spur further investment. Aboard with him were two Virginia Indians recently taken prisoner: Weroance Sasenticum and his son Kainta.
- c. November 9, 1610: George Somers died at Bermuda from exhaustion.
- c. 1610: Captained by Nathaniel West, the Mary Ann carried widow Mistress Francis West to Virginia.
- c. 1610: The Mary and Thomas (also known as Mary and James) carried William Tucker to Virginia.

== 1611 ==
- c. 1611: Henricus was founded on Farrar's Island.
- c. January 4, 1611: Henry Spelman was returned to Samuel Argall, in trade for copper ore to Jopassus (brother to paramount chief).
- c. Winter of 1611: Colonists suffered from scurvy, including "Kemps", a native living with the English. Dr. Lawrence Bohun experimented in treating the disease with local vegetables, such as Ipomoea purga and sassafras.
- c. 1611: Thomas West, 3rd Baron De La Warr contracted an illness. He boarded a ship bound for Nevis, West Indies, (captained by Samuel Argall), but was blown off course and forced to sail to England.
- March 1611: Thomas West returned to England, appointing George Percy to lead the colony in his absence.
- August 1611: Thomas Gates returned to Virginia at the head of an expedition that included three ships, 280 men, 20 women, 200 heads of cattle, 200 swine, and various other supplies and equipment.
- c. 1611: Puritan Reverend Alexander Whitaker arrived in Jamestown.
- c. 1611: John Rolfe cultivated Nicotiana tabacum as a viable cash crop for smoking tobacco (marketed as "Orinoco tobacco").

== 1612 ==
- c. 1612: Area drought ended after six years.
- c. 1612: The Bermuda settlement of "New London" (later named St. George's) was founded, becoming the oldest continuously inhabited British town in the New World.

== 1613 ==
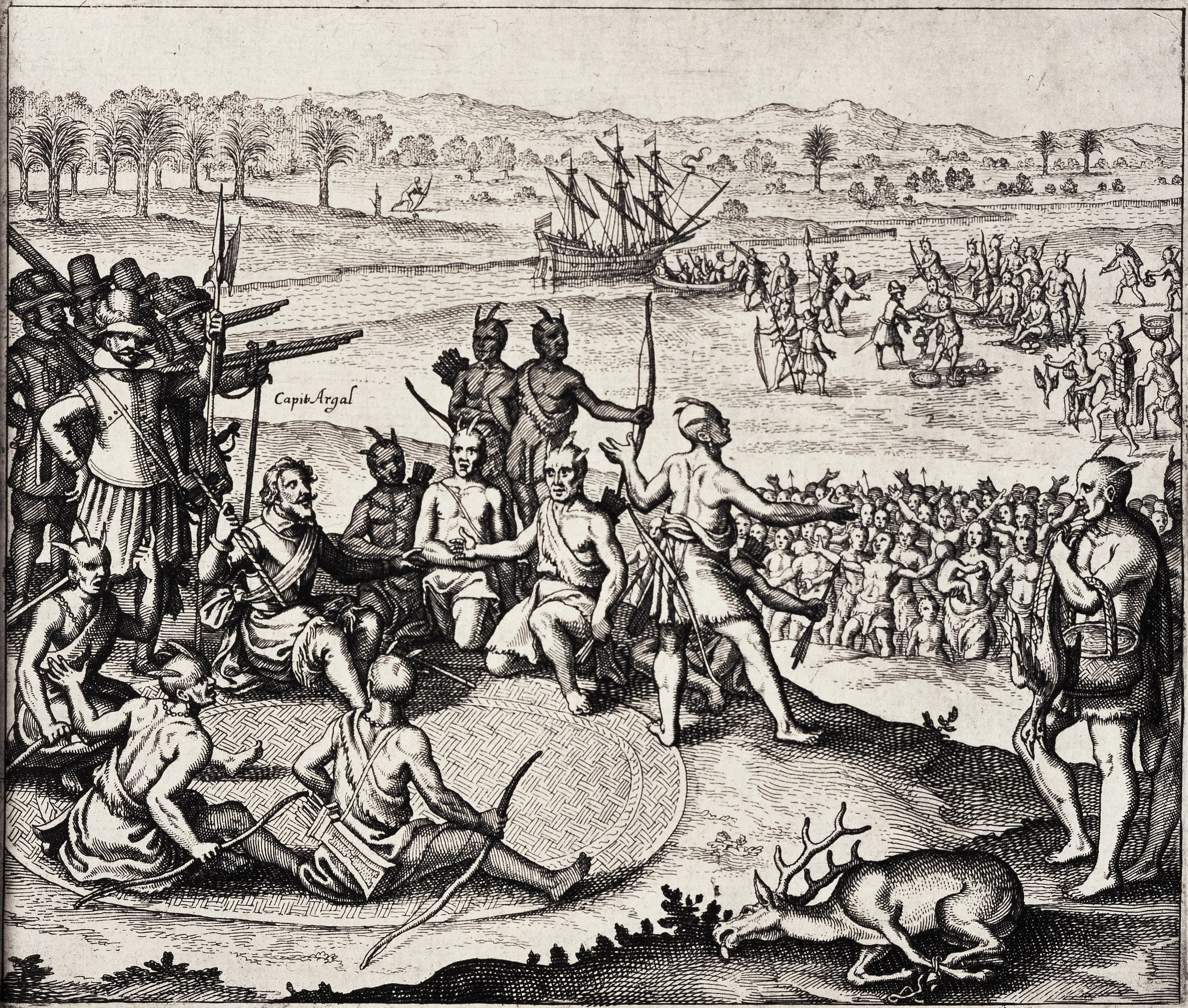
Depiction of Samuel Argall making peace with the Chickahominy people in 1614

- c. 1613: Thomas Dale founded "Bermuda Cittie", which was renamed to "Charles City" (and later City Point, Virginia)
- 13 April 1613: Samuel Argall abducted Pocahontas for use in prisoner exchange for return of English captives by Powhatan.

== 1614 ==
- c. 1614: Pocahontas was baptised by Alexander Whitaker and was given a Christian name of "Rebecca", Henricus.

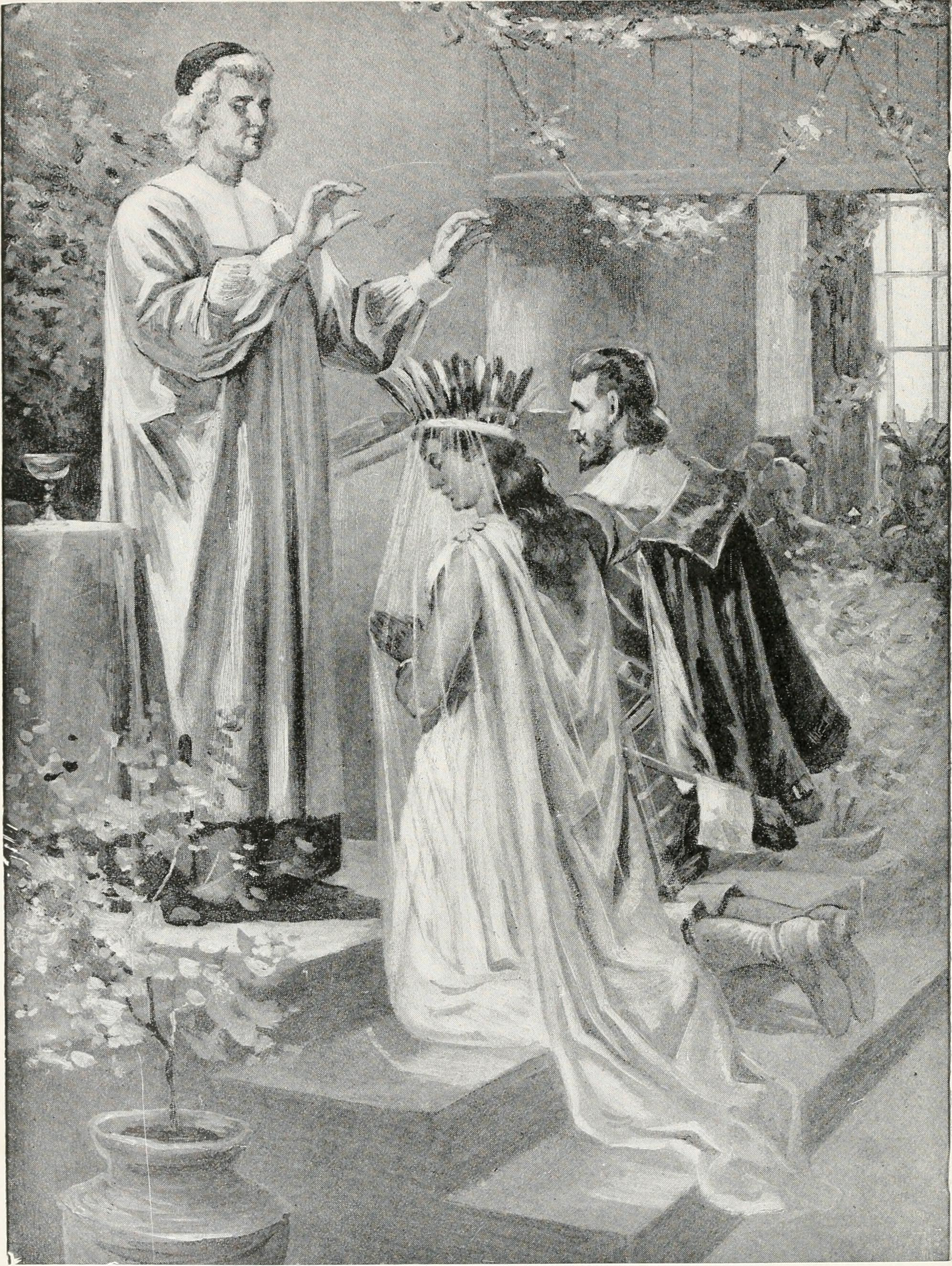
Depiction of the marriage of John Rolfe and "Rebecca" (Pocahontas)

- April 5, 1614: Richard Buck officiated the marriage of John Rolfe and Pocahontas (known as "Rebecca" Rolfe). A period of peace occurred between the natives and the colonists. The Rolfes then moved to Varina Farms.

== 1615 ==
- c. January 1615: Pocahontas gave birth to a son, Thomas Rolfe, at Varina Farms.
- c. 1615: The Somers Isles Company was formed by a charter to colonize the "Somers Isles" (Bermuda).

== 1616 ==
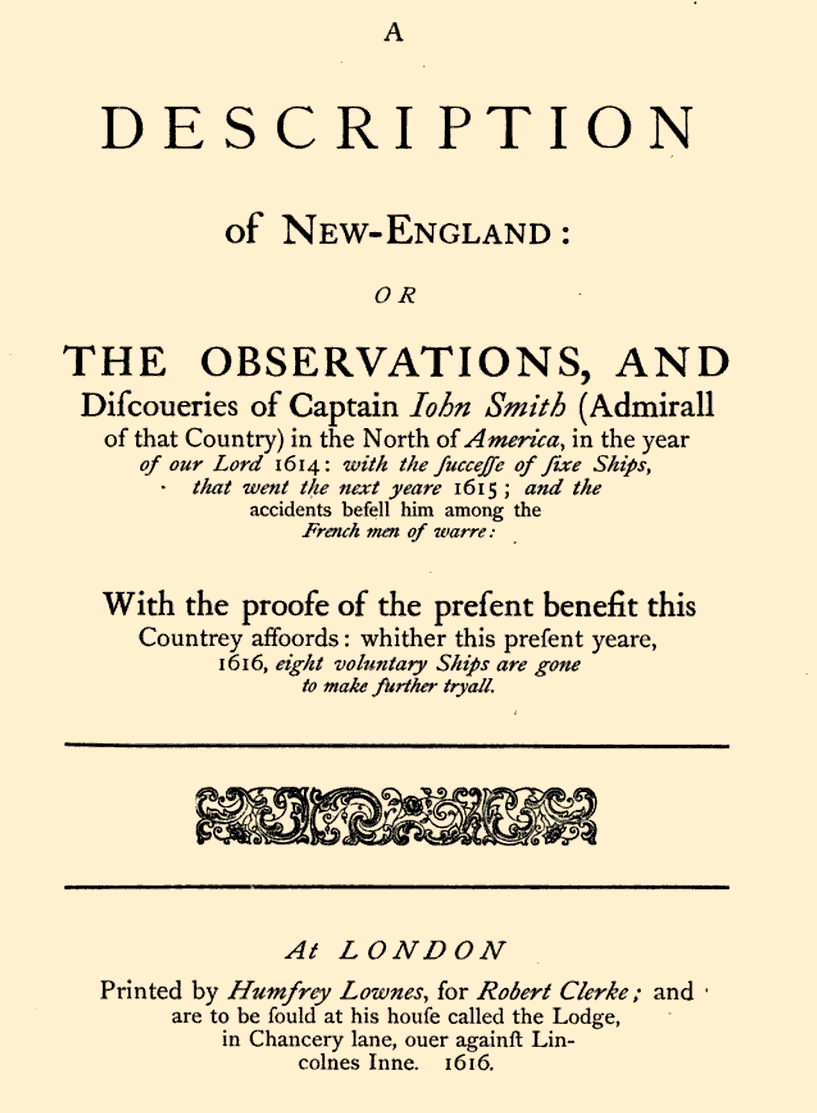
A Description of New England by John Smith

- Spring 1616: John Rolfe, "Rebecca Rolfe" (Pocahontas), son Thomas Rolfe, a company of about 12 Powhatans, Stephen Hopkins, Thomas Dale, and others left for England aboard the Treasurer.
- April 1616: George Yeardley was appointed deputy-governor while Thomas Dale returned to England. Yeardley relaxes laws and punishments set by Dale's Code, and the colony prospered.

== 1617 ==
- c. March 1617: John Rolfe and "Rebecca" (Pocahontas) boarded a ship to return to Virginia, but they had sailed only as far as Gravesend on the River Thames when Pocahontas became gravely ill
- c. March 1617: "Rebecca" (Pocahontas) died from unknown causes (perhaps a respiratory disease), aged 20 or 21 years.
- May 25, 1617: John Rolfe returned to Virginia on the George, led by Samuel Argall. Argall was assigned to replace George Yeardley as Governor, finding Jamestown in a deteriorated state.
- c. 1617: Alexander Whitaker drowned in the James River.

== 1618 ==
- c. 1618: Powhatan (Native American leader) died. His brother Opitchapam officially assumed power, but Opechancanough is considered the chief-paramount.
- c. April 1618: Lord De La Warr died en route to Virginia, and was replaced by George Yeardley.
- c. October, 1618: George Yeardley and his wife, Temperance Flowerdew, traveled to England.
- November 18, 1618: The Virginia Company of London issued its "Instructions to George Yeardley," which included the establishment of the ancient planter/headright system. Part of the purpose was to encourage settlers to emigrate to Virginia, which included building a college. These instructions came to be known as the Great Charter.
- November 24, 1618: George Yeardley was knighted by James VI and I.

== 1619 ==
- c. January 1619 (N.S.): Ship George departed from England with George Yeardley, Temperance Flowerdew, Edmund Rossingham, Doctor John Pott, Mistress Pott, and others.
- c. April 1619: Ship George arrived to Virginia.
- c. May 1619: A craftsmen strike began due to a lack of voting rights.
- July 21, 1619: Jamestown craftsmen strike ended.
- July 30, 1619: The first Virginia General Assembly convened at the Jamestown Church. Dale's Code was no longer law.
- c. late August 1619: The first Africans in Virginia were purchased from The White Lion and Treasurer as "indentured servants" for tobacco farming. This included "Angela".
- December 4, 1619: Captain John Woodlief (Woodleefe) and the Margaret (of Bristol) arrived at Berkeley Hundred with 36 settlers and 19 crewman (all males). By written order of the Virginia Company of London, the passengers held a Thanksgiving, and celebrated the same holiday in 1620 and 1621.
- December 31, 1619: Virginia Company forces London boys and girls from Bridewell and Bethlehem Hospitals to sail on the Duty, such as the likes of Christopher Browne, age 12 years, and Henry Carman, age 17. It is intended that they will work as child labor to farm tobacco. They are dubbed "Duty boys" in Jamestown.

== 1620 ==
- 1620: 90-100 English women were enlisted as tobacco brides to help the gender inequality and family gap of Jamestown.
- November 11, 1620: About 100 pilgrims arrived on the Mayflower to Provincetown Harbor, Cape Cod.

== 1621 ==
- October, 1621: The George arrived with Francis Wyatt (appointed to be Virginia Governor) and George Sandys.
- c. November 1621: Nemattanew (known derisively as "Jack-of-a-Feather") was slain by settlers.

== 1622 ==
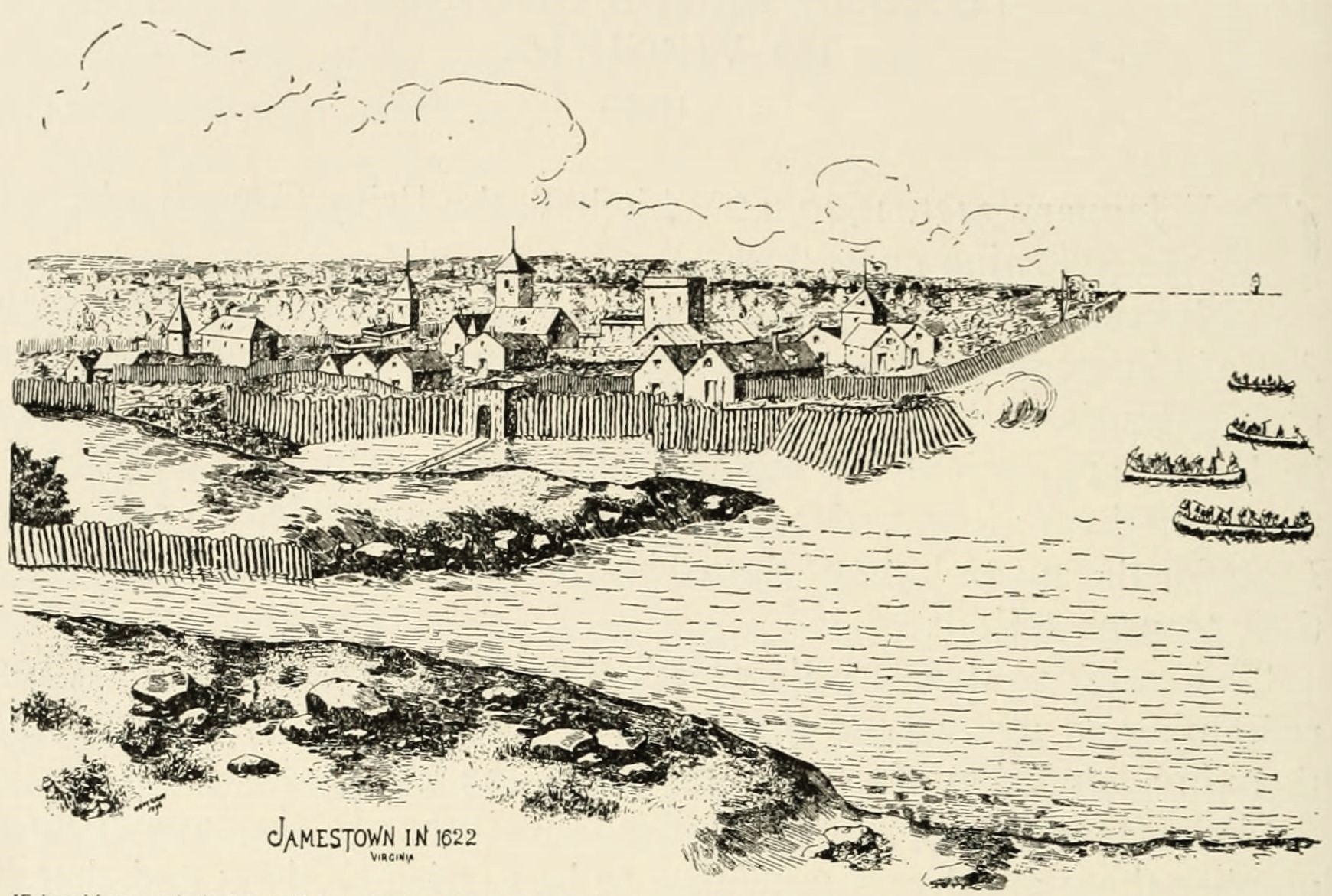
Jamestown, Virginia, 1622

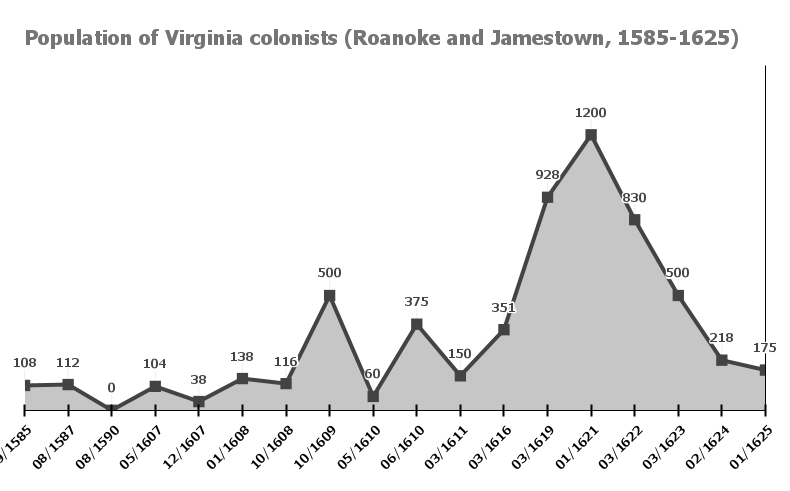
European population in Virginia over time

- c. March 1622: Ship Seaflower, containing relief supplies for Virginia, was accidentally sunk in Bermuda.
- March 22, 1622: Indian massacre of 1622 occurred, killing over 350 people in surrounding plantations and Henricus.
- December 20, 1622: Ship Abigail arrived with hungry, diseased passengers. The colony was reduced to 500 settlers over the winter.

== 1623 ==
- 1623: Captain William Norton arrived at the colony with skilled Italian glass workers.
- 1623: Conspiring with William Tucker, Dr John Pott fed poisoned wine to 200 natives, killing them in retaliation to the previous year's massacre.
- September 1623: William Claiborne mapped out "New Towne" for the growing Jamestown, now referred to as "James Cittie".

== 1624 ==
- May 24, 1624: The Virginia Company's royal charter was revoked due to overwhelming financial and political problems, making the Colony of Virginia a Crown colony (under royal authority) instead of a proprietary colony. The General Assembly was dissolved.

== 1625 ==
- March 1625: King James I died. Charles I of England assumed official control of the Kingdom of England.

== 1626 ==
- September 1626: Joan Wright was accused of witchcraft.

== 1629 ==
- 1629: Charles I of England granted his attorney general, Robert Heath, title and land south of Virginia. Dubbed "Carolana", it comprised present-day North Carolina, Georgia, and other parts of the Deep South.

== 1631 ==
- June 21, 1631: John Smith died in London, England.

== 1639 ==
- 1639: The King formally approved the restoration of the General Assembly.
- c. November 1639: Richard Lee I arrived in Virginia.

== 1640 ==
- July 1640: John Punch, an indentured servant to Hugh Gwyn, was sentenced to a lifetime of slavery by the Virginia Governor's Council. Punch was considered the first legal sanctioning of slavery in the English colonies.

== 1644 ==
- April 1644: Opechancanough planned another coordinated attack, which resulted in the deaths of another 350 to 500 of the 8,000 settlers in outlying plantations.

== 1646 ==
- 1646: Opechancanough was captured, taken to Jamestown, and shot in the back by a guard—against orders—and killed.

== 1649 ==
- January 30, 1649: Execution of Charles I. Charles II of England was crowned in February.
- 1649: Population estimates for Virginia was 15,000.

== 1676 ==
- July 30, 1676: Declaration of the People of Virginia.
- September 18, 1676: Jamestown was burned/torched by Bacon's Rebellion forces.
- October 1676: Nathaniel Bacon died, marking a death knell to the rebellion.
- 1676: Legislature temporarily used Middle Plantation as a statehouse.

== 1685 ==
- February 1685: Charles II of England dies. James II of England assumed the crown of the Kingdom of England.

== 1688 ==
- November, 1688: James II of England was deposed. Glorious Revolution occurred.

== 1693 ==
- 1693: College of William & Mary was established by a royal charter.

== 1697 ==
- 1697: Population estimate for the Virginia colony was 70,000.

== 1698 ==
- 1698: A fire was started by a prisoner awaiting execution. The conflagration destroyed the prison and the statehouse. The legislature was temporarily relocated to Middle Plantation and was able to meet in the new facilities of the College of William & Mary.

== 1699 ==
- 1699: Colony capital was permanently moved to Middle Plantation, which was renamed Williamsburg.

== 1750 ==
- c. 1750: Jamestown ownership consolidated into two families via land sales: Travis and Ambler.
