= Edmund Rossingham =

Virginia colonist and burgess

Captain Edmund Rossingham
- Other names: Edmund Roffingham, Ensigne Rossingham, Edmund van Rasseghem
- Occupation: Factor
- Years active: 1619-1633
- Relatives: Temperance Flowerdew (aunt), George Yeardley (uncle)

Member Virginia House of Burgesses

Military service
- Branch/service: Virginia colonial militia
- Rank: Ensign (1619); later Captain

Edmund Rossingham was the nephew of and factor for Sir George Yeardley, who was Governor of the Colony of Virginia and his wife Temperance Flowerdew. Rossingham was a member of the first assembly of the Virginia House of Burgesses in 1619, representing Flowerdew Hundred Plantation. After Yeardley's death, he sued the estate for unpaid wages, but Ralph Yeardley refused him on multiple requests.

== Early life ==
Rossingham was a son of Temperance Flowerdew's elder sister Mary Flowerdew and her husband Dionysis Rossingham. According to records, Edmund's original surname was "van Rasseghem".

== Arrival at Jamestown ==
Rossingham arrived in Jamestown in April 1619 with the returning Governor Yeardley, aboard the George.

Upon Yeardley's return to Virginia, he found the colony short of food. Yeardley sent Captain John Martin along with Ensign Harmon Harrison and Ensign Edmund Rossingham to the Chesapeake Bay to trade for corn with the native Indians. When the Indians refused to sell their corn, Martin took it from them by force. The General Assembly considered the matter but unlike with later controversies concerning Martin, Rossingham, as well as Speaker John Pory and others supported Martin's side.

== Burgess ==
Along with John Jefferson, Ensign Edmund Rossingham represented Yeardley's plantation, Flowerdew Hundred, in the first assembly of the Virginia House of Burgesses in Jamestown, July 30–August 4, 1619 (N.S.).

== Work for Yeardley ==
Rossingham reported that Yeardley gave him a power of attorney and sent him to Newfoundland to trade in January 1620. Rossignham worked for Yeardley as a factor in 1621 and 1623. He also was in England in 1622 to seek debt relief for Yeardley from the Virginia Company of London and the Society of Southampton Hundred. While in England, he testified against Captain John Martin in a Virginia Company hearing concerning Martin's disputes with Yeardley as well as giving information about conditions in Virginia. By this time, Rossingham was identified as Captain.

== Compensation dispute with Yeardley estate ==
Sir George Yeardley died in Jamestown on November 10, 1627. Rossingham then tried to obtain payment for his services from Yeardley's estate, stating that he was the chief means of raising the value of the estate to £6,000. Ralph Yeardley, brother of George and administrator of his estate, refused to pay Rossingham. The commissioners for Yeardley's plantation awarded Rossingham 360 pounds on September 25, 1629 but Yeardley still refused to pay. After Rossingham petitioned the Privy Council, on February 19, 1630, the Council ordered Ralph Yeardley to pay Rossingham 200 pounds. Since Yeardley still refused to comply with the order, Rossingham brought suit against him in the Court of Chancery which continued until at least November 1630.
