= Ancient planter =

Early English settlers in Virginia

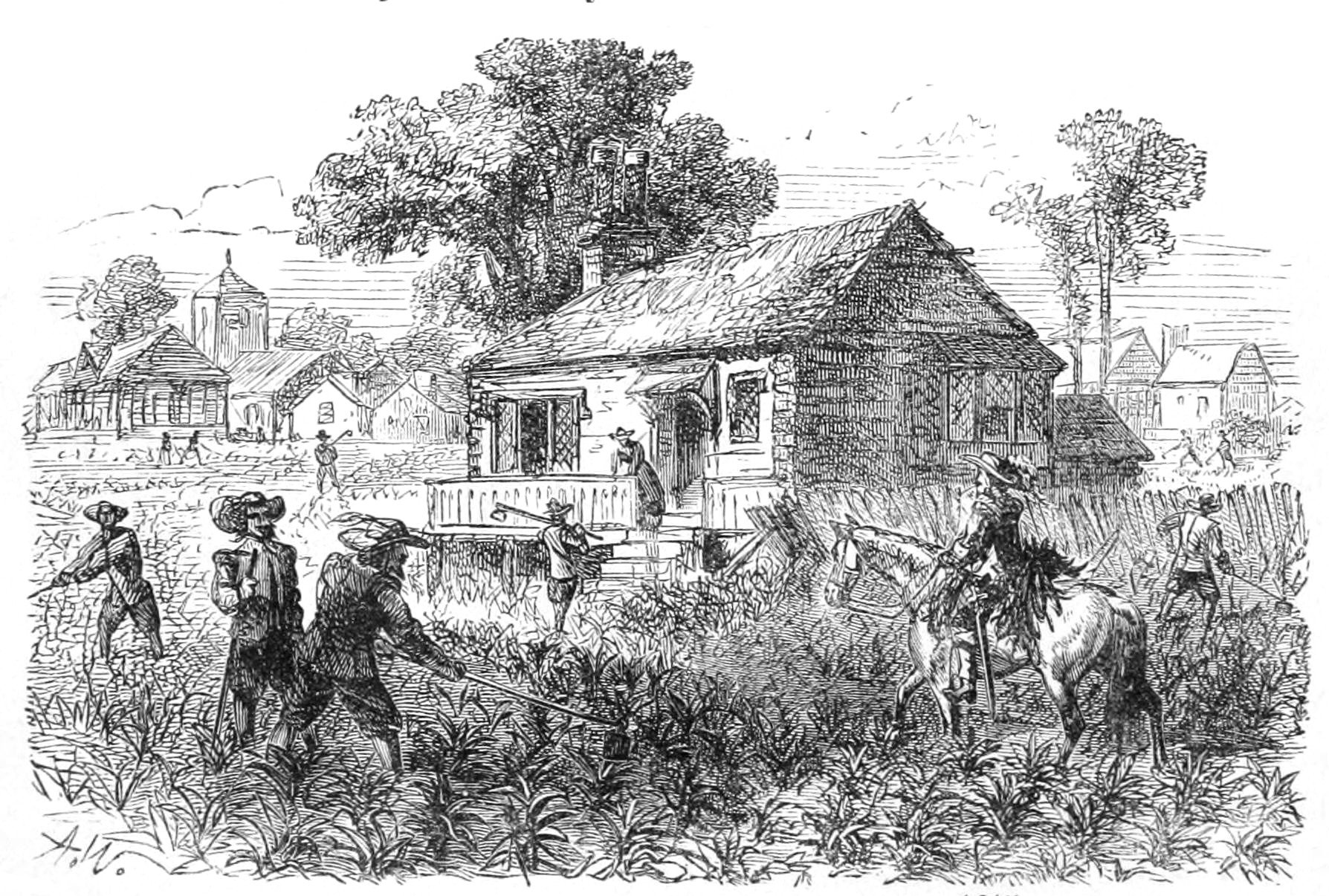
"Cultivation of tobacco at Jamestown 1615"

Ancient planter (sometimes called ancient colony man) was a term applied to an early settler who migrated to the Colony of Virginia before 1616 (O.S.) and remained there for at least three years. The settler received a land grant, which was equivalent to a dividend of investing in the Virginia Company (the colony's joint-stock administrative body) as a shareholder. Under the terms of the "Instructions to Governor Yeardley" (issued in 1618), these persons received the first land grants in the New World.

== History ==
These land grants constituted a dividend paid out by the Virginia Company of London, which was constituted as a joint stock company. Under the terms of the Second Charter, issued in 1609, the Company offered shares for twelve pounds ten shillings per share, to be invested and reinvested for seven years. Those men who ventured to Virginia in person, investing their time and risking their lives, would each be counted as holding one share.

In the spring of 1616, at the end of the administration of Sir Thomas Dale, the first dividend became due and payable to all who had invested, whether by the purchase of shares or by "personal adventure". However, since the colony had not prospered, there was no money to divide. Instead, the Company offered grants of land. Colonists who had paid their own passage to Virginia received a "first dividend" of 100 acres (0.40 km^{2}), free of quit-rent, for their "personal adventure", and an additional hundred acres for each share they owned in the London Company:

...the ancient adventurers and Planters which were transported thither with Intent to Inhabit at their own costs and charges before the coming away of Sir Thomas Dale, Knight, and have so continued during the space of three years, shall have upon a first Division to be afterwards by us augmented one hundred acres of Land for their personal adventure and as much for every single share of twelve pounds ten shillings paid for such share allotted and set out to be held by them their Heirs and assigns forever.

Those who had been brought at the Company's expense (as indentured servants) also received 100 acres for their "personal adventure", but in their case the land was subject to an annual rent of one shilling per 50 acres:

And that for all such planters as were brought thither at the Company's charge to Inhabit there before the coming away of the said Sir Thomas Dale after the time of their service to the Company on the common Land agreed shall be expired there be set out one hundred acres of Land for each of their Personal adventure to be held by them their Heirs and assigns for ever paying for every fifty acres the yearly free Rent of one shilling to the said Treasurer and company and their successors at one entire payment on the feast day of Saint Michaels the Archangel forever.

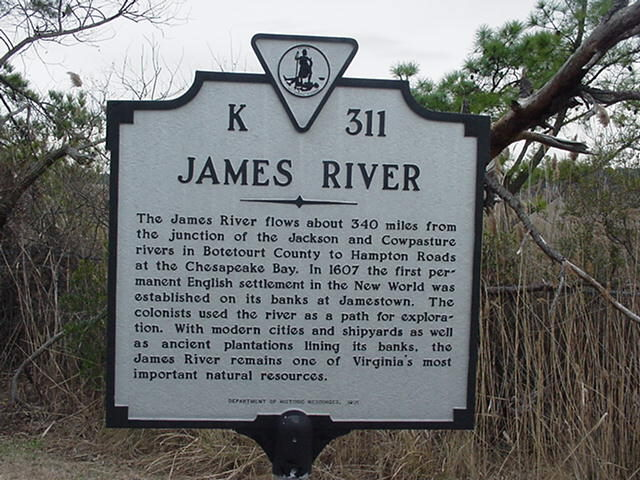
Historical marker mentioning ancient plantations along the James River

Colonists who arrived after the departure of Sir Thomas Dale were entitled to a lesser grant of 50 acres (0.20 km^{2}). The London Company reasoned that "... by the singular Industry and virtue of the said Sir Thomas Dale the former Difficulties and Dangers were in greatest part overcome to the great ease and security of such as have been since that time transported thither". In other words, those who had come earlier received twice as much land, supposedly in recognition of the greater risks and hardships they had endured. Of course, reducing the size of the grant to 50 acres also saved the hard-pressed Company a great deal of money, and the later colonists can scarcely be said to have experienced the "great ease and security" mentioned by the Company; the death rate continued extremely high.

The phrase "ancient planter" was not an honorific; it was simply a descriptive term, as used in the "Instructions", for a planter of long standing.

According to a letter from John Rolfe dated January 1619/20:

All the Ancient Planters being sett free have chosen places for their dividends according to the Comyssion. Which giveth all greate content, for now knowing their owne landes, they strive and are prepared to build houses & to clear their groundes ready to plant, which giveth great encouragement and the greatest hope to make the Colony florrish that ever yet happened to them.

== Identification ==
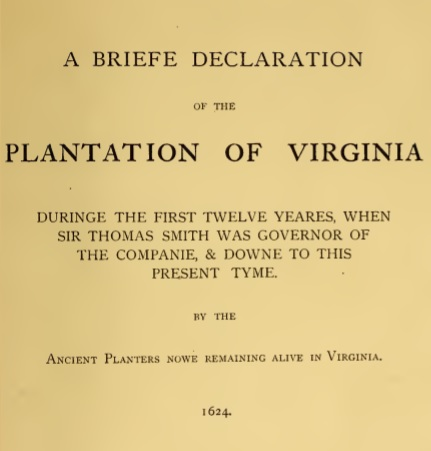
Title page of "A Breife Declaration of the Plantation of Virginia duringe the first Twelve Yeares" (1624)

Because the surviving historical records are incomplete, and sometimes demonstrably inaccurate, it is not possible to compile a definitive list of ancient planters.

The database of Colonial Land Office Patents at the Library of Virginia is the principal source of information as to the identities of those who received grants as ancient planters. Though the record does not begin until 1623, when administration of the colony was taken over by the Crown, many of the subsequent patents identify "ancient planters", or provide information which shows that a tract of land must have been originally granted under the terms applying to Ancient Planters.

Additional information comes from the 1624/5 Muster, a census ordered as part of the handover of the colony from the Virginia Company to the Crown. For some of the colonists, the census includes information on the year and ship of arrival. In many cases this valuable information is missing.

Also as part of the transition to Crown Colony status, a list of grants was compiled in 1625 and sent to London. This list does not identify the ancient planters as such, but in some cases knowledge of the grant combined with information from other sources (e.g., knowledge of the date of arrival) is enough to show that the planter in question must have received the grant as an ancient planter.

=== Notable ancient planters ===
- Samuel Argall
- Robert Beheathland
- Richard Buck
- Anne Burras and John Laydon
- Raleigh Croshaw
- James and Rachel Davis
- Thomas Dowse
- Temperance Flowerdew
- Thomas Gates
- Thomas Graves
- Cecily Jordan Farrar
- Samuel Jordan
- Richard and Isabella Pace
- William Powell
- John and Alice Proctor
- John Rolfe
- Thomas Savage
- John Smith
- William Spencer
- William Tucker
- Francis West
- Robert and Joan Wright
- George Yeardley

== See also ==
- Headright
- Planter class

== Bibliography ==
- Billings, Warren M., ed. (1975). "An Account of George Percey". The Old Dominion in the Seventeenth Century. UNC Press. pp. 22–27. ISBN 978-0-8078-1234-1.
- Boddie, John B. (1974) [1948, Dietz Press]. Colonial Surry. Baltimore, MD: Genealogical Publishing Co. OCLC 11744120.
- Campbell, Charles (1860). History of the Colony and Dominion of Virginia. Philadelphia: Lippincott. OCLC 457248042.
- Coldham, Peter W. (1987). The Complete Book of Emigrants 1607-1660. Baltimore, MD: Genealogical Publishing Co. ISBN 978-0-8063-1192-0. OCLC 22434255.
- Dorman, John F., ed. (2004). Adventurers of Purse and Person 1607-1624/5 (4th ed.). First Families of Virginia. ISBN 978-0-8063-1744-1. OCLC 54456619.
- Hotten, John Camden (1983). The Original Lists of Persons of Quality. Baltimore, MD: Genealogical Publishing Co. ISBN 978-0-8063-0605-6.
- Hume, Ivor Noel (1994). The Virginia Adventure: Roanoke to James Towne. New York: Alfred A. Knopf. ISBN 978-0-394-56446-3. OCLC 28891458.
