= Flowerdew Hundred Plantation =

Archaeological site in Virginia, United States

- U.S. National Register of Historic Places
- U.S. Historic district
- Virginia Landmarks Register
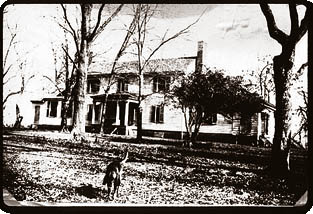
- Wilcox House at Flowerdew Hundred, built 1804, demolished 1955.

- Location within Virginia Location within the United States
- Nearest city: Garysville, Virginia
- Coordinates: 37°17′46″N 77°06′15″W
- Area: 1,400 acres (570 ha)
- NRHP reference No.: 75002030
- VLR No.: 074-0006

Significant dates
- Added to NRHP: August 1, 1975
- Designated VLR: May 20, 1975

Flowerdew Hundred Plantation dates to 1618/19 with the patent by Sir George Yeardley, the Governor and Captain General of Virginia, of 1,000 acres (400 ha) on the south side of the James River. Yeardley probably named the plantation after his wife's wealthy father, Anthony Flowerdew, just as he named another plantation "Stanley Hundred" after his wife's wealthy mother, Martha Stanley. (Yeardley's wife, Temperance Flowerdew, came from English gentry in the County of Norfolk.) A "hundred" was historically a division of a shire or county. With a population of about 30, the plantation was economically successful with thousands of pounds of tobacco produced along with corn, fish and livestock. Sir George paid 120 pounds (possibly a hogshead of tobacco) to build the first windmill in British America.

Today, Flowerdew Hundred plantation is a private residence.

== History ==
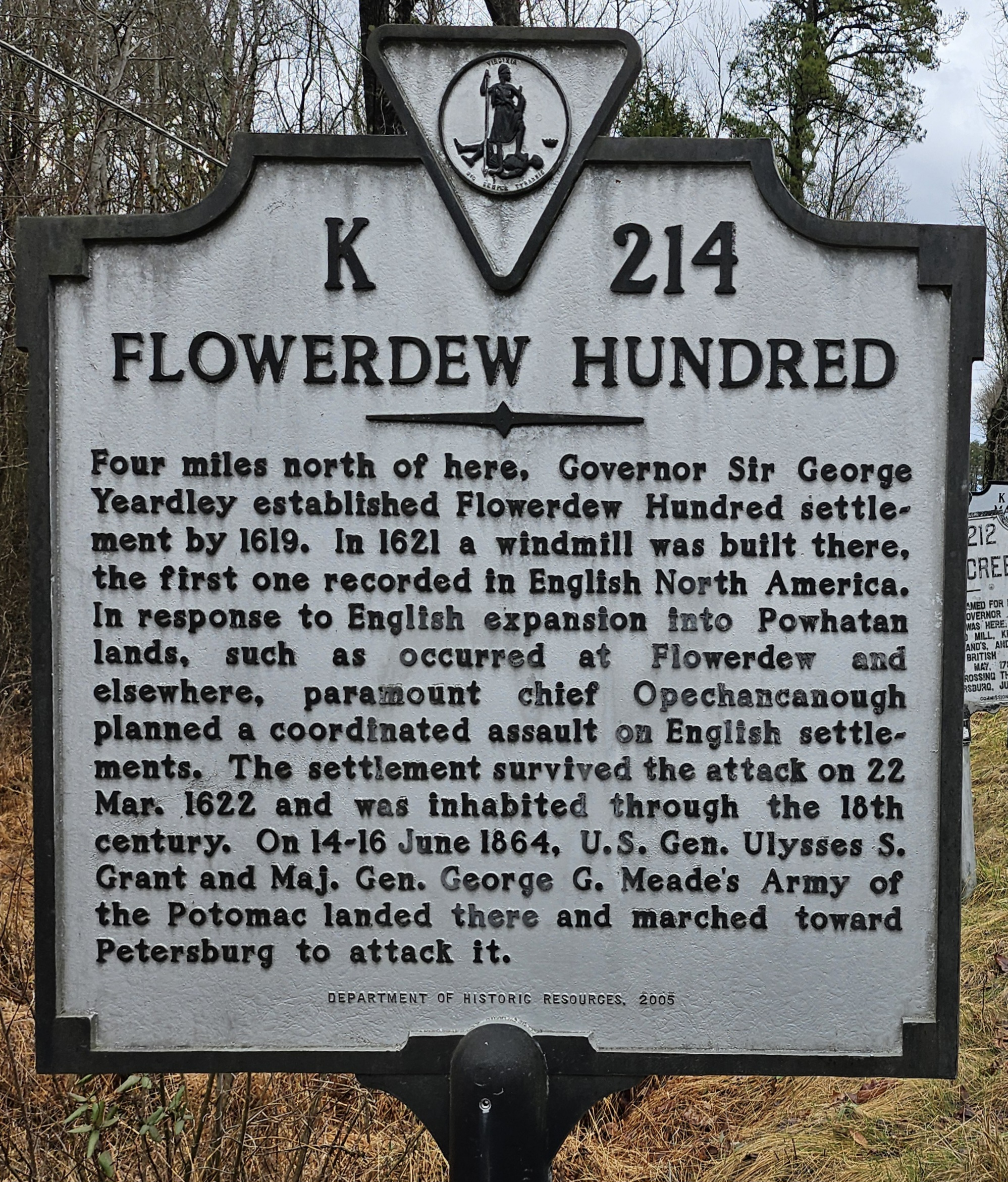
Flowerdew Hundred historical marker

Sometimes written as "Flowerdieu", the plantation survived the Indian massacre of 1622 with only six deaths, remaining an active and fortified private plantation unlike many others in the area, such as the Citie of Henricus and Martin's Hundred, that were abandoned. The first windmill erected in English North America was built at Flowerdew Hundred by 1621, and was an English post mill. In 1624, Abraham Piersey, Cape Merchant of the Virginia Company, purchased Flowerdew Hundred renaming it Piersey's Hundred. Piersey's Stone House was the first home with a permanent foundation in the colony. The 1624 Muster lists approximately sixty occupants at the settlement, including some of the first Africans in Virginia.

Throughout the seventeenth century, Flowerdew Hundred continued to prosper with the establishment of a secondary settlement. In 1683, with the passage of the king's Advancement of Trade Act, Flowerdew Towne was formed down river, but it was not very successful within the James River planter economy. Sometime after 1720, a ferry ran from Flowerdew Hundred across the stretch of the James known as "Three Mile Reach" to the north bank of the James. An ordinary or tavern was eventually built there for the convenience of the passengers.

Part of the old Hundred was acquired by Joshua Poythress and passed through several of his descendants also named Joshua Poythress. The property was shelled during the 1781 campaign of Gen. Benedict Arnold. He ordered Lt. Col. Simcoe and some Queen's Rangers to spike the guns near Hood's fort on the eastern edge of the property and then continued to the capital of Richmond, setting it afire.

The Plantation was re-formed again through the work of John Vaughn Willcox, a Petersburg merchant. He married the last Poythress heiress and bought up the surrounding tracts that were part of the original land grant that had been sold off during the 18th century. In 1804 they built a new farmhouse on the high ridge overlooking the fertile bottom lands along the James, but maintained their primary residence in nearby Petersburg.

The Civil War came to Flowerdew in June 1864 when the Commanding General of the Armies of the United States Ulysses S. Grant ordered his men to cross the James River in an effort to outflank Gen. Robert E. Lee and capture the City of Petersburg and its rail hub that was vital to the Confederate war effort. In support of the Overland Campaign, the Corps of Engineers, in a remarkable feat of construction, built a pontoon bridge across the James in one evening, setting a record for the longest floating bridge ever built. Grant's Crossing from Weyanoke to Flowerdew (or Wilcox Landing as it was then known) held this record until World War II. The Army of the Potomac with three corps and a supply train crossed the river in about three days heading for City Point to begin the Siege of Petersburg.

The site of the pontoon bridge was found again in 1986 by Eugene Prince and Taft Kiser. Using Prince's Principle, a simple 35 mm camera, a cypress tree on the riverbank, and an Andrew Joseph Russell photograph taken in 1864, they were able to place the bridge into the modern landscape. A dead limb on a cypress tree in the Gardner photograph was still present 122 years later and confirmed the location as the site of the crossing.

The old Willcox house was torn down in 1955 though a magnolia planted in 1840 still survives in the yard of the large mansion that was built on its former site in the late 20th century. The bald cypress tree that anchored the great pontoon bridge also remains. In 1978, a commemorative windmill of English post design was built on the farm by English Millwright Derrick Ogden. The windmill has since been removed from the property.

Over the years the name has been spelled as Fleur de, Flowerdieu, Flower de and Flourdy Hundred. Other names for the property include Piersey or Peircey's Hundred, Selden's (Selden family), Hood's, and Bellevue. It is listed on Virginia's Captain John Smith Chesapeake National Historic Trail, Civil War Overland Campaign Lee-Grant Trail, and the National Register of Historic Places.

Flowerdew Hundred Plantation is currently owned by local businessman and former NASCAR driver Jeff Oakley.

== Archaeology ==
The original land grant of 1,000 acres contains over 60 archaeological sites ranging from archaic Native American encampments to twentieth century homesteads. Registered sites include 44PG64 (Stone House excavation); 44PG65 (Fortified Area); 44PG113 (Selden House sites) and 44PG98 (Flowerdew Towne/Ferry Complex). Archaeological investigations began at Flowerdew in the late 1960s and continued through 1995, when archaeologist James Deetz led the final excavation within the original limits of the fortified area. The excavations yielded more than 500,000 artifacts, all of which are currently housed at the University of Virginia.

One of many notable artifacts is the Prince of Orange medallion, which was minted in 1615. Three other such medallions have been found, including one at Historic Jamestowne, and in a Native American grave at Burr's Hill, Rhode Island. In addition, one medallion is held by the British Museum.

== Foundation ==
In 1975, David A. Harrison III, then owner of Flowerdew Hundred, created the Flowerdew Hundred Foundation. The Foundation operated a museum and conducted tours of the plantation and reconstructed windmill until 2007. The windmill was donated to the American Wind Center and Museum in Lubbock, Texas. It was dismantled and moved to Lubbock in 2010. The Foundation closed its doors on October 12, 2007. After Harrison's death the plantation was sold.

== See also ==
- William Smith, a Revolutionary War veteran born in Flowerdew Hundred

== Sources ==
- Dawson, Henry B., Battles of the United States, (Vol. I. New York. 1858).
- Deetz, James, Flowerdew Hundred: the Archaeology of a Virginia Plantation 1619-1864. (Charlottesville: University of Virginia Press, 1993).
- Frassanito, William A., Grant and Lee, the Virginia Campaigns, 1864-1865 (New York, Charles Scribner's Sons, 1983).
- Hannum, Warren T., "The Crossing of the James River in 1864," The Military Engineer. 1932. Vol. XV. No. 81. P. 229-237.
- Hatch, Charles E., The First Seventeen Years: Virginia, 1607-1624 (Charlottesville: University of Virginia Press, 1957).
- Huston, James A. "Grant's Crossing of the James" (The Military Engineer. 1953. Vol. XLV, No. 303. P. 18-22).
- Jester, A., ed., Adventures of Purse and Person, Virginia 1607-1624/5 (Alexandria: Order of First Families of Virginia, 1987).
- Hume, Ivor Noël, The Virginia Adventure. (New York, Alfred A. Knopf. 1994).
- Prince, Eugene. Antiquity. (March, 1988. Vol. 62, No. 234. P. 113-116).
- Prince, Eugene. "Photography for discovery and scale by superimposing old photographs on the present-day scene." Antiquity. 1988. Vol. 62, No. 234. P. 113-116.
