= Samuel Argall =

16/17th-century English naval officer and colonial official in Virginia

Sir Samuel Argall Admiral of New England
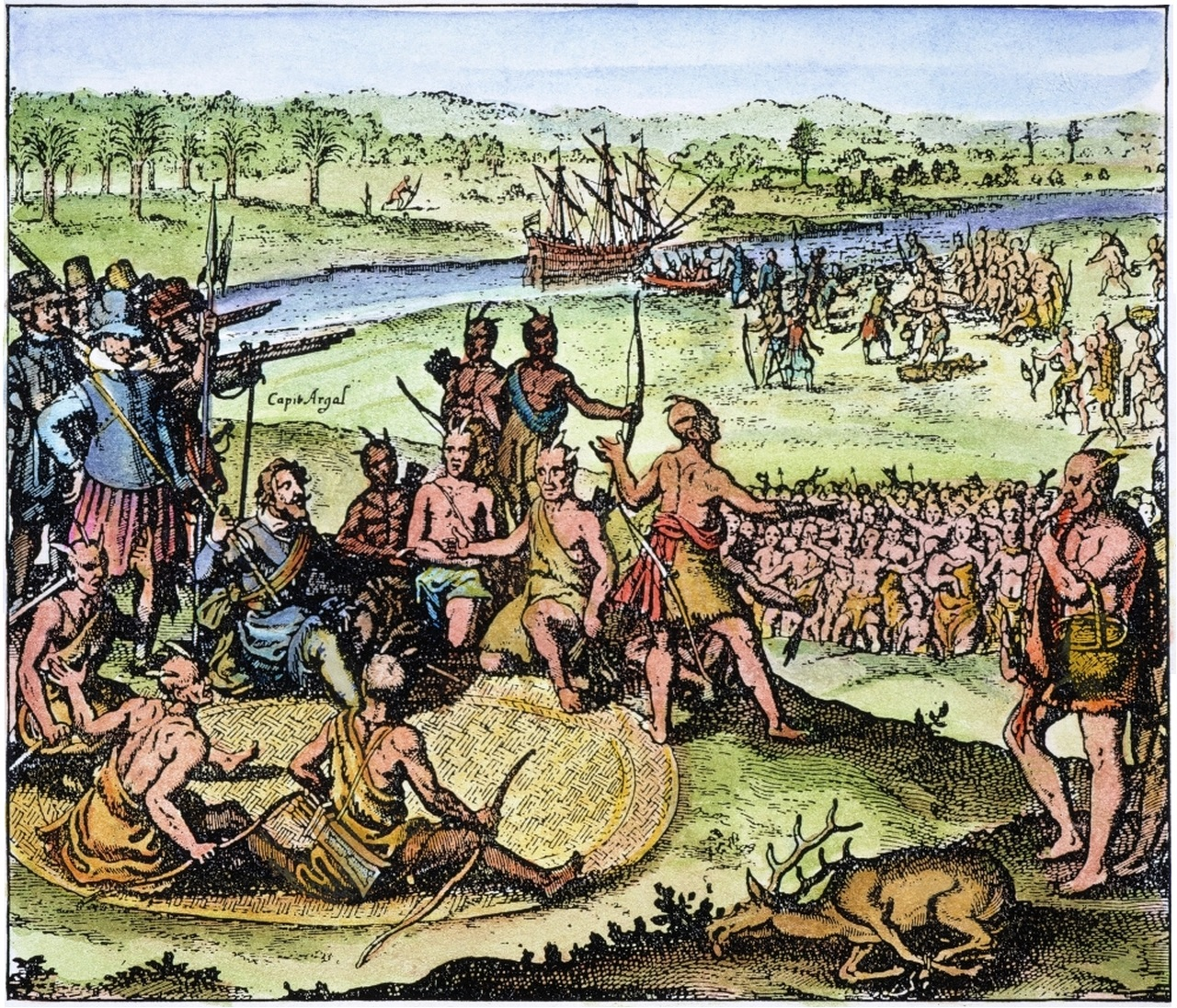
- Illustration of Argall meeting with Chickahominy people
- Born: c. 1572 – c. 1580
- Died: January 1625/26 (O.S./N.S.); Died at sea
- Burial place: Penryn, Cornwall
- Other names: Samuel Argal, Argoll [sic]
- Occupations: Sea captain, adventurer, privateer
- Employer: Virginia Company of London

Colonial Governor of Virginia Deputy-Governor
- In office 1617–1619

Military service
- Rank: Admiral (1622)
- Commands: Mary and John, Treasurer, Swiftsure

Sir Samuel Argall (b. c. 1572 or 1580 – d. 1626) was an English sea captain, navigator, and Deputy-Governour of Virginia, an English colony.

As a sea captain, in 1609, Argall was the first to determine a shorter northern route from England across the Atlantic Ocean to the new English colony of Virginia, based at Jamestown, and made numerous voyages to the New World. He captained one of Lord De La Warr's ships in the successful rescue mission to Virginia in 1610 which saved the colony from starvation.

In 1610 he named Delaware Bay in honor of Lord De La Warr. Shortly afterwards Dutch settlers along the bay gave it a different name, but the name Delaware Bay was restored when the English took control of the area in 1665.

He is best known for his diplomacy by force with the Chief of the Powhatan Confederacy. He abducted the Chief's daughter, Pocahontas, on 13 April 1613, and held her as a captive at Henricus as security against the return of English captives and property held by Powhatan. Pocahontas had long been a friend of the English and was treated with great respect according to her rank, as the English considered her an Algonquian princess.

Eventually peace and trade relations were restored between the English and the Powhatan Confederacy, after English planter John Rolfe, of nearby Varina Plantation, met and married Pocahontas. Argall was also successful in taking action against French efforts at colonisation in Acadia in North America, and in North Africa. London ruled that the French violated the Charter of the Virginia Company.

Knighted by King James I after serving as Governor of the Virginia Colony, Argall was accused by planters of having been excessively stern in his treatment of them. Examinations of his conduct in London and the opinion of some modern historians have disputed these charges.

== Childhood ==
Samuel Argall, baptized 4 December 1580, was the fourth son of Richard Argall (c. 1536–1588) of East Sutton, Kent, by his third wife, Mary Scott (d. 1598). She was the daughter of Sir Reginald Scott of Scot's Hall, one of the foremost houses in Kent, and his second wife, Mary Tuke, the daughter of Sir Bryan Tuke of Layer Marney, Essex and his wife. Tuke was secretary to Cardinal Wolsey.

== Shorter route to Virginia ==
In 1609, The Virginia Company of London was assembling Jamestown supply mission of nine ships, which included the Virginia and Sea Venture. Ahead of this flotilla was Samuel Argall and the Mary and John.

According to records, the voyage on the Mary and John was partially financed by a merchant of the name John Cornelis (or "Cornelius") who desired a shipment of fish. Argall was the first to develop a shorter, more northerly route for sailing from England across the Atlantic Ocean to the Virginia Colony and its primary port and seat of government at Jamestown. Rather than following the normal practice of going south to the tropics and west with the trade winds, Argall sailed west from the Azores to Bermuda and then almost due west to the mouth of the Chesapeake Bay. His voyage aboard the Mary and John took nine weeks and six days, including two weeks becalmed. This new route enabled the English to avoid hostile Spanish ships and to save on provisions.

Upon his arrival at Jamestown, Captain Argall found the colonists in dire straits. Argall resupplied them with all the food he could spare and returned to England at the end of the summer. The help came to the colony at one of the most critical periods in its history, as this was the beginning of the Starving Time, during which fewer than one in five survived. Without the provisions supplied by Argall, the colony may have been totally destroyed.

During this voyage, Argall also prevented the Spanish Empire from learning about the weakness of the Jamestown colony. In July 1609, Argall encountered a Spanish reconnaissance ship, La Asunción de Cristo, under the command of Francisco Fernández de Écija, sent from St. Augustine by governor Pedro de Ibarra to survey activities at Jamestown. Argall had a larger ship at Cape Henry, and chased the Spanish ship, preventing it from entering Chesapeake Bay.

== Under Lord De La Warr ==
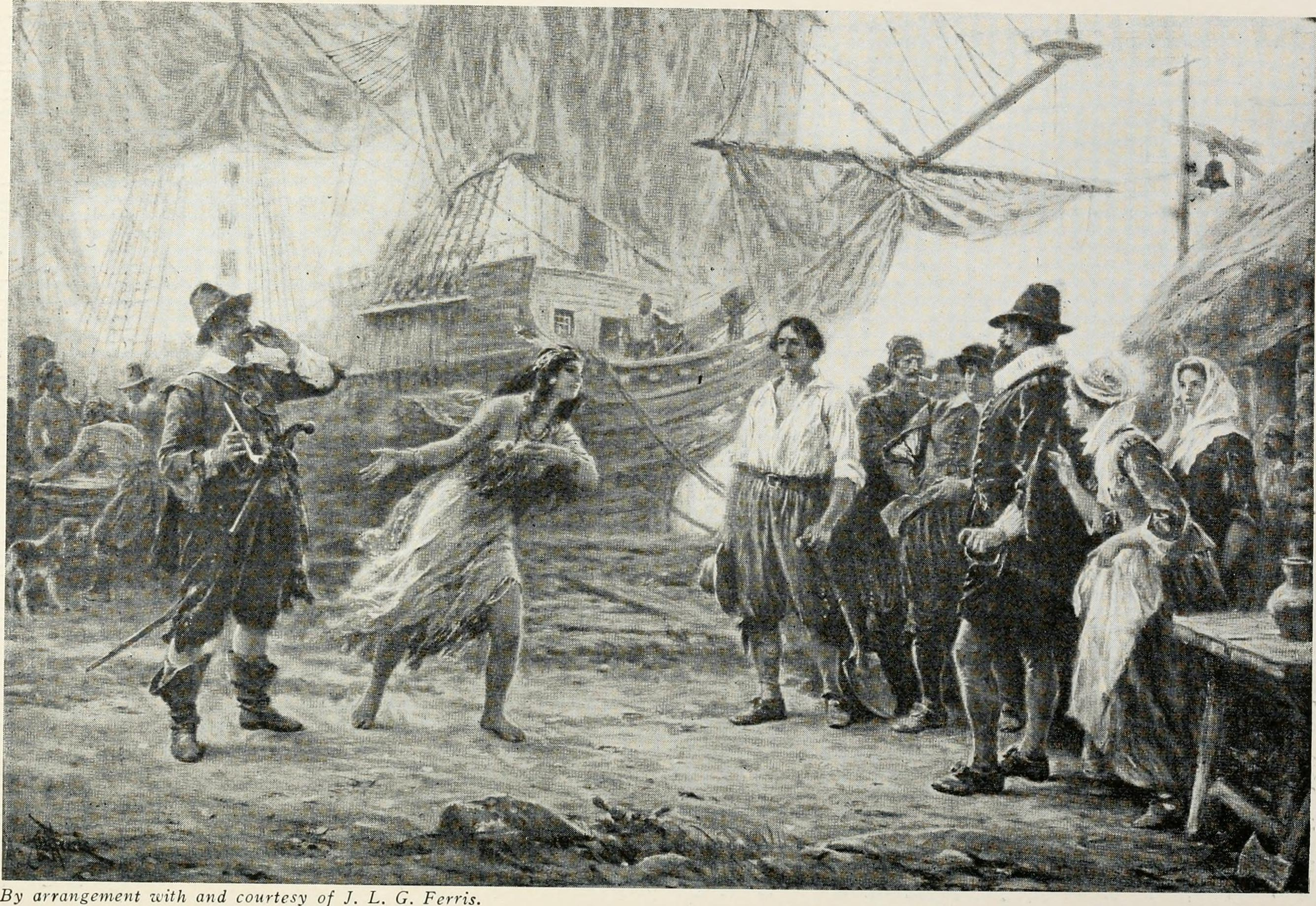
The Abduction of Pocahontas, with Argall on the left

Argall returned to the Virginia Colony in the summer of 1610, when Royal Governor Thomas West, 3rd Baron De La Warr reinforced the defences of the English against the sometimes hostile Native Americans there. De La Warr became so ill that in the spring of 1611 he sailed home to England, and Sir Thomas Dale took his place as Deputy Governor in charge of the Virginia Colony. After De la Warr reached England and recovered, he wrote a book, The Relation of the Right Honourable the Lord De-La-Warre, of the Colonie, Planted in Virginia. He was considered the nominal Royal Governor until his death in 1618.

Serving under Dale, in March 1613, Argall, looking for food for the settlement, sailed up the Potomac River. There, he traded with the Patawomeck, a Native American tribe who were affiliated with the Powhatan Confederacy. The Patawomeck lived at the village of Passapatanzy, as well as several other villages along the river.

When two English colonists began trading with the Patawomeck, they discovered that Pocahontas, the daughter of Wahunsonacock, Chief of the Powhatan Confederacy, was living there. According to a book by Captain John Smith, she had been there for around three months. (But he had left the colony in 1609 and had only a brief exchange with Pocahontas during her visit to England, so the claim is difficult to verify.) Learning this, Argall resolved to capture Pocahontas to aid in negotiations with the Powhatan. Sending for the local chief, Japazaws, Argall told him he must bring her on board his ship, Treasurer and suggested luring her with the present of a copper kettle.

According to Patawomeck oral tradition, with the help of Japazaws, the colonists tricked Pocahontas into being captured. Their purpose, as Argall said in a letter, was to ransom her for English prisoners held by Chief Powhatan, along with various weapons and farming tools that the Powhatan people had stolen. Powhatan returned the captives, but failed to satisfy the colonists with the amount of weapons and tools he returned. A long standoff ensued.

Argall also used Treasurer to take Pocahontas, her family, and her retinue, including her brother in law Uttamatomakkin, to visit England in 1616. He also captained the ship George, that returned John Rolfe to Virginia, after his wife's sudden death.

=== Raid on Acadia ===
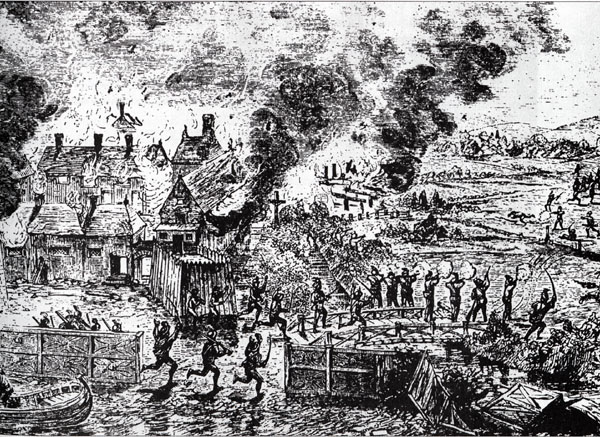
"Fire at Port-Royal following Samuel Argall's attack in 1613"

Later in 1613, under orders from London, Argall began to raid Acadia, a French colony in what is now Canada. First he sacked the French Jesuit colony of Saint-Sauveur on Mount Desert Island (now part of the state of Maine). He took fourteen prisoners, whom he transported back to Jamestown. He then returned to burn the settlement and remaining structures of an earlier French settlement on Sainte-Croix (now in Maine) and the occupied site of Port Royal (now in Nova Scotia). One of his principal French captives later wrote to praise Argall's character and conduct toward the prisoners. Argall was also the first Englishman to visit Manhattan, where he landed and warned the Dutch of their encroachment upon English territory.

=== Land ownership and departure from Virginia ===
Back In the Virginia Colony, Argall was viewed as an autocrat who was insensitive to the poorer of the colonists, who included indentured servants. The London Company granted him a parcel of land, which he forced free ancient planters to clear, and used the colony's stock of corn to farm.

After Argall served as Principal Governor of Virginia beginning in 1617, Lord De La Warr was enroute from England to investigate complaints about the man, but died at sea in 1618. Before he could be investigated further, Samuel Argall gave gubernatorial powers to Captain Nathaniel Powell and absconded to England aboard the pinnace, Ellinor, in 1618/9. Argall was succeeded by Sir George Yeardley (who named a son "Argoll" in his honor). After returning to London, Argall was cleared of the accusations against him, and continued to serve King James I.

== Later life and career ==
In 1620, Argall was captain of a merchant vessel that took part in an expedition against Algiers in North Africa. It was then part of the Ottoman Empire. On his return, he was made a member of the Council for New England. Later he was named admiral for New England.

On 26 June 1622, Argall was knighted by King James I. In 1625, he was admiral of a fleet of 28 vessels, which took many prizes in capturing other nation's vessels off the coast of France. In October he commanded the flagship in an unsuccessful attack on Cádiz, Spain.

Argall never married. He died at sea on or about 24 January 1626. He left a will dated 23 May 1625, which was proved 21 March 1626. In it he mentions the following relations: sister Filmer, niece Sarah Filmer, nephew Samuel Filmer; sister Bathurst, nephew Samuel Bathurst; sister Fleetwood; brother John Argall Esq and John's son Samuel, whose descendants have flourished in Virginia and the West. He was interred in St Gluvias churchyard, Penryn, Cornwall.

== Representation in other media ==
- Argall (voiced by Kevin Farrell) appears in the Animated Hero Classics 1994 episode Pocahontas.
- Yorick van Wageningen portrays Argall in Terrence Malick's 2005 film The New World.

== Notes ==
Sources

- Baldwin, R. C. D. "Argall, Sir Samuel". Oxford Dictionary of National Biography (online ed.). Oxford University Press. doi:10.1093/ref:odnb/640. (Subscription, Wikipedia Library access or UK public library membership required.)
- Coote, Henry Coote (1885). "Argall, Samuel" . In Stephen, Leslie (ed.). Dictionary of National Biography. Vol. 2. London: Smith, Elder & Co. pp. 78–80.
- Johnson, Rossiter, ed. (1906). "Argall, Sir Samuel". The Biographical Dictionary of America. Vol. 1. Boston: American Biographical Society. pp. 134–135.
- Wilson, J. G.; Fiske, J., eds. (1900). "Argall, Samuel" . Appletons' Cyclopædia of American Biography. New York: D. Appleton. p. 88.
- Squires, W. Austin (1979) [1966]. "Argall, Sir Samuel". In Brown, George Williams (ed.). Dictionary of Canadian Biography. Vol. I (1000–1700) (online ed.). University of Toronto Press.
- Baldwin, R.C.D. (2004). "Argall, Sir Samuel (bap. 1580, d. 1626)". Oxford Dictionary of National Biography (online ed.). Oxford University Press. doi:10.1093/ref:odnb/640. (Subscription, Wikipedia Library access or UK public library membership required.)
- Richardson, Douglas (2011). Everingham, Kimball G. (ed.). Magna Carta Ancestry: A Study in Colonial and Medieval Families. Vol. II (2nd ed.). Salt Lake City: Douglas Richardson. p. 165. ISBN 978-1449966386.
- Richardson, Douglas (2011). Everingham, Kimball G. (ed.). Magna Carta Ancestry: A Study in Colonial and Medieval Families. Vol. IV (2nd ed.). Salt Lake City: Douglas Richardson. pp. 2–3. ISBN 978-1460992708.
- Squires, W. Austin (1979) [1966]. "Argall, Sir Samuel". In Brown, George Williams (ed.). Dictionary of Canadian Biography. Vol. I (1000–1700) (online ed.). University of Toronto Press.
- Roberts, Gary Boyd (2004). The Royal Descents of 600 Immigrants. Genealogical Publishing Company.

Government offices
Preceded by George Yeardley	Colonial Governor of Virginia; 1617–1619	Succeeded by George Yeardley
