= George Yeardley =

Colonial governor of Virginia

Sir George Yeardley Captain-General and Lord Governor
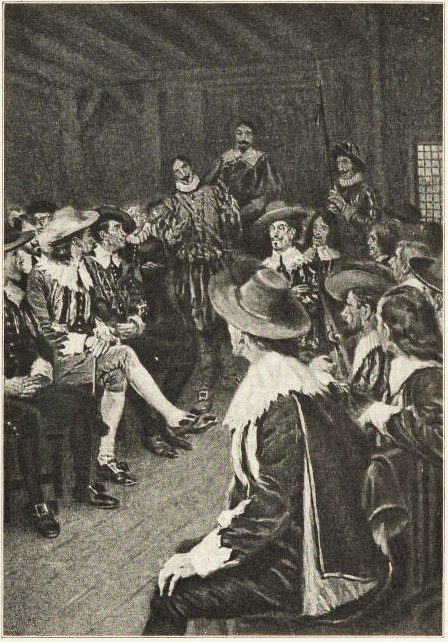
- First Virginia Assembly, Governor Yeardley presiding (in center)
- Born: 1587; St. Saviour's Parish, Southwark, Surrey
- Died: November 13, 1627 (aged 39–40)
- Resting place: Jamestown Church
- Other names: George Yardley, Yearlly
- Occupations: Ancient planter, colonist
- Spouse: Temperance Flowerdew (m. 1618–1627)
- Children: 3
- Awards: Knight Bachelor (1618)

Governor of Virginia
- In office November 1616 – November 1617
- Appointed by: James I
- Preceded by: Thomas Dale
- Succeeded by: Samuel Argall
- In office November 1618 – November 1621
- Appointed by: James I
- Preceded by: Samuel Argall
- Succeeded by: Francis Wyatt
- In office March 4, 1626 – November 13, 1627
- Appointed by: James I
- Preceded by: Francis Wyatt
- Succeeded by: Francis West

Military service
- Rank: Captain of the guard (1609)

Signature
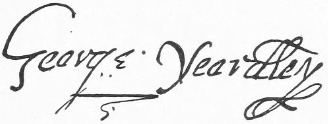

Sir George Yeardley (b. 1587 – d. November 13, 1627) was a planter and colonial governor of the colony of Virginia. He was also among the first slaveowners in Colonial America. A survivor of the Virginia Company of London's ill-fated 1609 Third Supply Mission, whose flagship, the Sea Venture, was shipwrecked on Bermuda for ten months, he is best remembered for presiding over the initial session of the first representative legislative body in Virginia in 1619. With representatives from throughout the settled portion of the colony the group became known as the House of Burgesses and continued to meet, becoming the Virginia General Assembly.

== Early life ==
Yeardley was baptized on July 28, 1588, in St. Saviour's Parish, Southwark, Surrey. He was the son of Ralph Yeardley (1549–1604), a London merchant-tailor, and Rhoda Marston (died 1603). He chose not to follow his father into trade, but instead became a soldier and joined a company of English foot-soldiers to fight the Spanish in the Netherlands. As Captain of the Guard (bodyguard), he was selected to serve Sir Thomas Gates during his term as Governor of Virginia.

== Shipwreck ==
Yeardley set sail from England on June 1, 1609, with the newly appointed Sir Thomas Gates aboard the Sea Venture, the flagship of the ill-fated Third Supply expedition to Jamestown. After eight weeks at sea, and seven days from expected landfall, the convoy ran into a tropical storm and the Sea Venture was shipwrecked in the Bermuda island chain. Fortunately, everyone survived. The castaways thrived on the uninhabited island. Despite numerous problems (including civil unrest among the former passengers resulting in Gates declaring martial law) two small ships were built within 10 months. The two ships, the 70–80 ton Deliverance and the 30 ton pinnace Patience, arrived at Jamestown on May 23, 1610.

== Jamestown (1610–1615) ==
The shipwreck survivors found the colonists of Jamestown in desperate condition. Most of the settlers had died from sickness or starvation or had been killed by Indians. Sir Thomas Gates agreed with the Jamestown settlers to abandon the colony and return to England. He ordered Captain Yeardley to command his soldiers to guard the town preventing settlers from setting fire to the structures that were evacuated. Lord de la Warr soon arrived bringing supplies to save the struggling colony. Captain Yeardley was co-commander of the early Forts Henry and Charles at Kecoughtan--present-day Hampton, Virginia. In October 1610, Lord De La Warr ordered Captain Yeardley and Captain Edward Brewster to lead 150 men into the mountains in search of silver and gold mines.

== Political career in the New World ==
In 1616 Yeardley was designated Deputy-Governor of Virginia. One of his first accomplishments was to come to an agreement with the Chickahominy Indians that secured food and peace for two years. He served from 1616 to 1617.

In November 18th, 1618, The Virginia Company of London issued its "Instructions to George Yeardley," which included the commissioning of a general assembly and the ancient planter/headright system. Part of the purpose was to encourage settlers to come to Virginia, which included building a college. These instructions come to be known as the Great Charter.

On November 24th, Sir George was appointed to serve three years as governor of Virginia, and was knighted by James I during an audience at Newmarket. Before sailing to Virginia with the Great Charter, a great comet appeared over England. It was considered a bad omen for the English, but (apocryphally) a herald of American freedom.

A relation from the Flowerdew family, John Pory, served as secretary to the colony from 1618 to 1622. And when Flowerdew Hundred sent representatives to the first General Assembly in Jamestown in 1619, one was Ensign Edmund Rossingham, a son of Temperance Flowerdew's elder sister Mary Flowerdew.

Yeardley led the first representative Virginia General Assembly, the legislative House of Burgesses, to meet on American soil. It convened at the church in Jamestown on July 30, 1619. One of the first acts of this representative body was to set the price of tobacco.

Yeardley was governor of Virginia when, in August 1619, the White Lion landed "20. and odd" Angolans kidnapped in Africa and exchanged them for provisions, thus introducing the trade in enslaved Africans into the English colonies on the North American mainland.

Yeardley was appointed deputy-governor again in 1625. On September 11, 1626, Yeardley presided over the witchcraft inquiry of Joan Wright, the first legal witchcraft inquiry on record against an English settler in any British North American colony.

He served a second time as governor from March 4, 1626/27 until his death on November 13, 1627.

=== Land ownership ===
In 1619, he patented 1,000 acres (4.0 km^{2}) of land on Mulberry Island. He owned another private plantation upriver on the south side of the James River opposite Tanks Weyanoke, named Flowerdew Hundred, and owned several enslaved persons. It is often assumed that Yeardley named this plantation "Flowerdew Hundred" after his wife, as a kind of romantic tribute. However, the land appears to have been in use by Stanley Flowerdew, Yeardley's brother-in-law, before it was patented by Yeardley. Although George Yeardley acquired the thousand acres that he named Flowerdew Hundred in 1619, it seems very likely that some settlement had begun there before that date, for his brother-in-law Stanley Flowerdew took a shipment of tobacco to England in the same year, probably grown on the same property. With a population of about thirty, Flowerdew Hundred Plantation was economically successful with thousands of pounds of tobacco produced along with corn, fish and livestock. In 1621 Yeardley paid 120 pounds (possibly a hogshead of tobacco) to build the first windmill in British America. The windmill was an English post design and was transferred by deed in the property's 1624 sale to Abraham Piersey, a Cape Merchant of the London Company. The plantation survived the 1622 onslaught of Powhatan Indians, losing only six people. so the plantation may have been associated with the Flowerdew name before Yeardley's patent. Note that Yeardley named his Mulberry Island plantation "Stanley Hundred", undoubtedly after his Stanley in-laws. In other words, both of Yeardley's plantations were named in honor of his wealthy in-laws. Clearly, the Yeardley-Flowerdew alliance was as much to do with power politics and social status as with romance.

=== Slaveholdings ===
Two ships arrived at Old Point Comfort in August 1619, the Treasurer (privateer) and White Lion, carrying "20 and odd" Africans seized from Spanish vessels. This caused some consternation because at least one of the ships flew a Dutch flag and had letter of marque from the Duke of Savoy authorizing capture of Spanish vessels, but Britain and Holland had recently signed a peace treaty banning privateering. Nonetheless, at least some of the enslaved Africans were sold in Virginia, divided between Governor Yeardley and Abraham Peirsey, the colony's official merchant who supplied the provisions the sea captains demanded.

The local burgess representing that Point Comfort area was William Tucker, whose brother Daniel Tucker was Governor of Bermuda, the chief executive of the Bermuda Company and a shareholder in the Virginia Company who after leaving Virginia had in 1616 sent a ship to the Lesser Antilles to trade for "negroes to dive for pearls". At least two African (Angolan) women became servants at Yeardley's Jamestown home (according to the census of February 1624 which listed 21 Africans as living in the colony) and the January 1625 census noted eight Africans (3 men and 5 women) at Yeardley's home (but failed to list their names nor ships of origin) and seven Africans at Flowerdew Hundred. Yeardley's will left his widow a life estate in their home, but ordered sale of all "goods, debts, servants, negars [sic], cattle nor any other thing or things, commodities or profits to me belonging." Other prominent early colonists with Africans in their households included William Tucker, Edward Bennett (who were free and ling on Virginia's Eastern Shore in 1630-1631), Captain Francis West (who had married Yeardleys widow), and Richard Kingsmill as guardian for orphans of Rev. Richard Buck.

== Family ==
Coat of Arms of George Yeardley

On 18 October 1618, George Yeardley (sometimes written as "Yardley" or "Yearlley" ) married Temperance Flowerdew, daughter of Anthony Flowerdew of Hethersett, Norfolk, and wife Martha Stanley of Scottow, Norfolk. A month later he was appointed to serve three years as governor of Virginia, and was knighted by James I during an audience at Newmarket on 24 November. This is the date commonly ascribed to the wedding; however, their children were born before 1618. While out-of-wedlock children occurred in early Jamestown, it would have been unthinkable for a woman of Temperance Flowerdew's station, so they likely got married between 1610 and 1615. Temperance Flowerdew had also sailed for Virginia in the 1609 expedition, aboard the Faulcon, arriving at Jamestown in August 1609. She was one of the few survivors of the Starving Time.

The couple had three children: Elizabeth Yeardley (listed as age 6 in the February 1624 Jamestown Muster, so was born about 1618, James City, Virginia, Died: ~1660-1666, Bruton Parish, York County, and inherited 1/3 of her Mother's Estate including Flowerdew Hundred Plantation; Some claim she married Major Joseph Croshaw, but his record here does not include her as one of his several wives), Argoll Yeardley (listed as age 4 in the February 1624 Jamestown Muster, so was born about 1620, married Frances Knight then in 1643 of Anne (Custis) had several children including Argoll Yeardly Jr. before his death in 1655 Francis Yeardley (listed as age 1 in the February 1624 Jamestown Muster, so was born about 1623 and died before 1655 in Lower Norfolk County).

== Death and legacy ==
Yeardley died on November 13, 1627. He is buried in Third Jamestown Church at Jamestown, Virginia. His widow, Temperance Flowerdew married Governor Francis West. Their son, Argoll Yeardley would represent Lower Norfolk county in the House of Burgesses in 1653, shortly before his death. Argoll Yeardly had married Ann Custis, who brought her brothers John Custis II and William Custis to the colony, where they became planters, served in the House of Burgesses, and founded the Custis family of Virginia.

=== In pop culture ===
Jason Flemyng plays Sir George Yeardley in a British television show, Jamestown.

=== Archaeological ===
On July 24, 2018, archaeologists from Jamestown Rediscovery and the Smithsonian Institution announced the discovery of a prominent burial around 400 years ago in an important spot within the church. Ground-penetrating radar confirmed the presence of a skeleton of the right age and build for Yeardley who died in 1627, aged about 40. The gender, age estimate, the way the body was laid out and its prominent location within the church, support its identity as Yeardley. Another church was built on top but the position indicates a high status burial. Although the head is missing, 10 teeth have been found and tests are being carried out by the FBI and archaeologist and geneticist Turi King, who helped identify the remains of Richard III in 2012. In 2025, a DNA comparison was done with a descendent of Katherin Yeardley (George's sister), which did not yield a successful match.

== Sources ==
- Deetz, James,Flowerdew Hundred: the Archaeology of a Virginia Plantation 1619-186. (Charlottesville: University of Virginia Press, 1993).
- Hatch, Charles E., The First Seventeen Years: Virginia, 1607–1624 (Charlottesville: University of Virginia Press, 1957).
- Dorman, J.F., ed., Adventures of Purse and Person, Virginia 1607-1624/5 (Alexandria: Order of First Families of Virginia, 1987).
- Hume, Ivor Noël, The Virginia Adventure. New York, Alfred A. Knopf. 1994).
- Kolb, Avery, "The Tempest",
- American Heritage: Four Hundred Years of American Seafaring, April/May 1983.
- "Wreck and Redemption", The Web of Time: Pages from the American Past, Issue Two, Fall 1998.
- "Francis Yeardley's Narrative of Excursions into Carolina, 1654," in Narratives of early Carolina, 1650–1708, ed. A.S. Salley, (New York, C. Scribner's Sons, 1911), 21–29
- "Yeardley, George" . Dictionary of National Biography. London: Smith, Elder & Co. 1885–1900.
- "Yeardley, Sir George". Oxford Dictionary of National Biography (online ed.). Oxford University Press. doi:10.1093/ref:odnb/30204. (Subscription, Wikipedia Library access or UK public library membership required.)

Government offices
Preceded by Thomas Dale	Colonial Governor of Virginia; 1616–1617	Succeeded by Samuel Argall
Preceded by Samuel Argall	Colonial Governor of Virginia; 1619–1621	Succeeded by Francis Wyatt
Preceded by Francis Wyatt	Colonial Governor of Virginia; 1626–1627	Succeeded by Francis West
