= Pedro de Zúñiga y de la Cueva =

Spanish diplomat (1600–1631)

Don Pedro de Zúñiga y de la Cueva
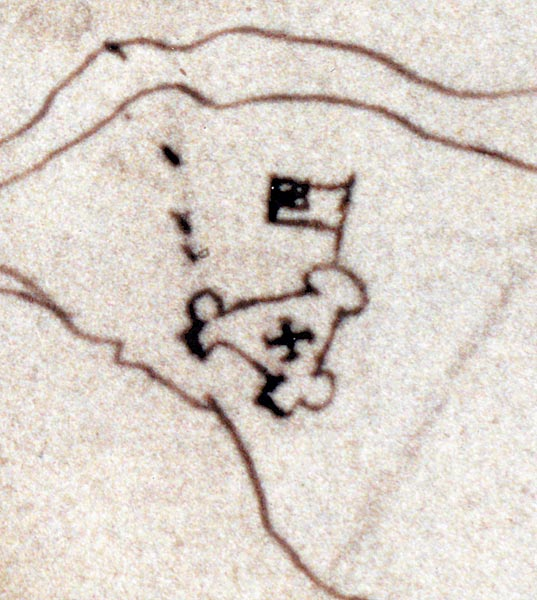
- Excerpt of a 1608 sketched map, depicting James Fort and surrounding area
- Preceded by: Carlos Coloma
- Succeeded by: Alonso de Velasco y Salinas
- In office 1605–1609
- In office 1612–1612
- Succeeded by: Diego Sarmiento de Acuña, Count of Gondomar

Personal details
- Born: 1560 Salamanca, Spain
- Died: 1631 (aged 70–71) Madrid, Spain
- Relations: House of Zúñiga

Don Pedro de Zúñiga y de la Cueva (or simply Don Pedro Zuniga) was a Spanish Ambassador to England from 1605 to 1609, then later in 1612.

== Ambassador in London ==
During the time of the New World colonization (notably the English Jamestown, Virginia, settlement) he held court with King James I of England. Pedro was a member of the House of Zúñiga, and the son of Diego de Zúñiga y Benavides, who was ambassador of France to Spain. Don Pedro Zuniga's counterpart in Spain was John Digby, 1st Earl of Bristol.

Zúñiga let off fireworks in the street in April 1605 on the news of the birth of the Spanish prince Philip and threw coins to the crowd. He was the Spanish ambassador during the Gunpowder Plot of November 1605 and was "highly unpopular" with the English.

Before England's attempts at colonization, Spain had already laid claim to much the east coast of America, considering "La Florida" as far north as the Outer Banks. The Anglo-Spanish War had ended in peace, but tensions still existed. From the Spanish, there was a desire to suppress other nations from exploiting the Americas. Piracy and privateering also made traveling to the Caribbean (and Americas) an uncertain endeavor for explorers. Don Pedro Zúñiga's activities included reconnaissance of the Virginia colony. Don Pedro Zúñiga implored Philip III to "drive out all who are now in Virginia", knowing of the low population of Englishmen, going as far as recommending interception of colony ships in 1608.

== Chart of Virginia ==
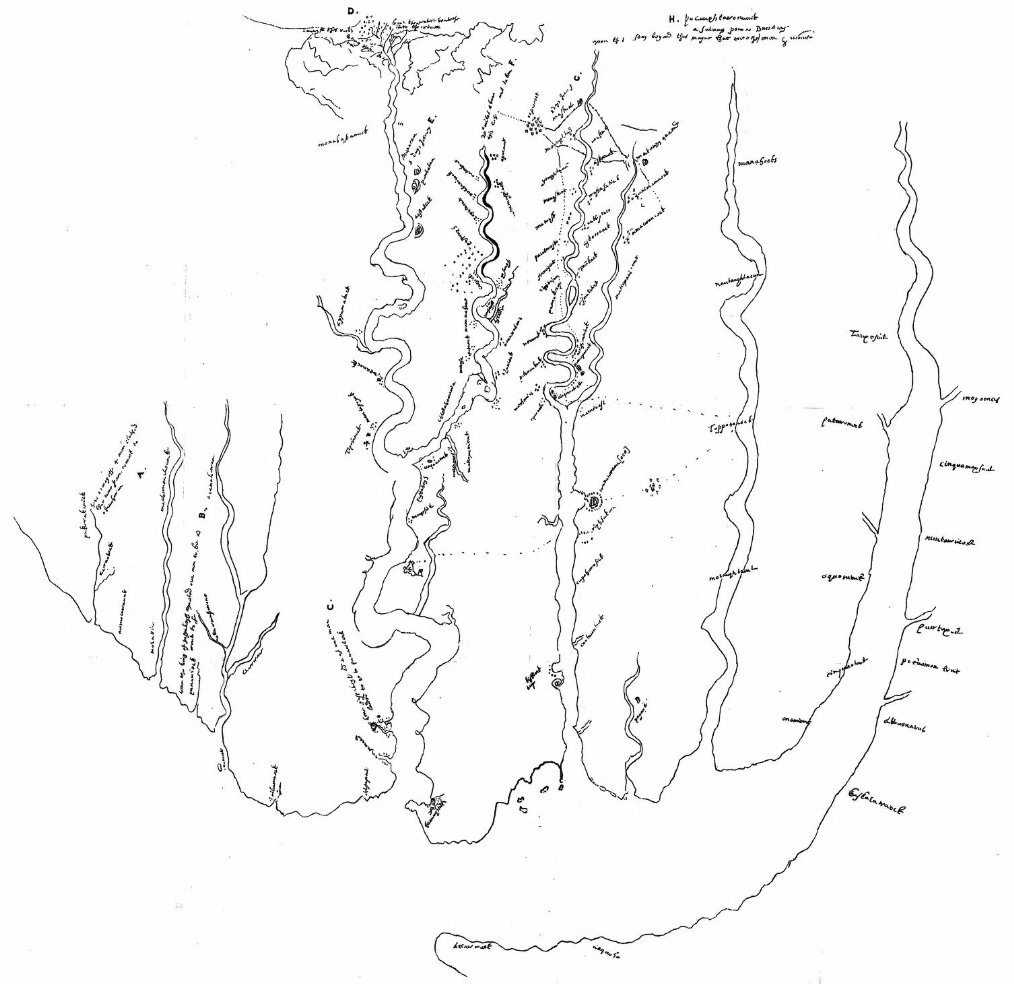
"Chart of Virginia", 1608 (oriented with Chesapeake Bay on the bottom of map)

Zuñiga obtained a manuscript map of Virginia, which included the location of Jamestowne (James Fort palisades), over 60 native villages, rivers, tributaries, and John Smith's route after capture by Opechancanough. It is likely the map (or chart) was delivered to the court of England by Captain Francis Nelson in 1608.

The draftsman of the chart is unknown—many cartographers are suspected, one being John Smith, or traveling companion Nathaniel Powell, or shipmaster Andrew Buckler (a possible spy). Zuñiga had a "confidential person" that had access to the Council of Governors, but history has not revealed the identity (or if that person was the draftsman).

The "Zuniga chart" was forwarded to King Philip III of Spain. The map was rediscovered in c. 1890 by historian Alexander Brown in Archivo General de Simancas, Valladolid, Spain. Sometimes called the "Smith-Zúñiga map", "Francis Nelson map", "Simancas map", or even "Velasco chart", it is the only known sketch of James Fort known to exist.
