= Temperance Flowerdew =

Colonial matron

Temperance Flowerdew, Lady Yeardley
- Born: Temperance Flowerdew c. 1587
- Died: 1629 (aged 41–42)
- Other names: Flowerdieu; Mrs. Richard Barrow (first husband); Lady Yardley, Lady Yearlley
- Occupation: Ancient planter
- Spouse(s): Richard Barrow (1609-1610), George Yeardley (1618-1627), Francis West (1628)

Temperance Flowerdew, Lady Yeardley (b. 1587 – d. 1628) was an early settler of the Jamestown Colony and a key member of the Flowerdew family, significant participants in the history of Jamestown. Temperance Flowerdew was wife of two governors of Virginia, sister of another early colonist, aunt to a representative at the first General Assembly and "cousin-german" (first cousin) to the Secretary to the Colony, John Pory.

Flowerdew was one of the few survivors of the winter of 1609–10, known as the "Starving Time", which killed almost ninety percent of Jamestown's inhabitants, including her first husband, Richard. Later, upon the death of her second husband, George Yeardley, Flowerdew became one of the wealthiest women in Virginia. Upon her death, the estate was transferred to her children despite the efforts of her third husband to claim it. Flowerdew was named one of the Virginia Women in History by the Library of Virginia in 2018.

== Sea voyage ==
Temperance Barrow sailed for Jamestown aboard the Faulcon [sic] commanded by Captain and council member John Martin, in May 1609 in a convoy of nine ships as part of the Virginia Company of London's Third Supply Mission. Whether she was accompanied by her husband, Richard Barrow, is not recorded. The flagship of the convoy, the Sea Venture, had the new leaders for Jamestown aboard. During the trip, the convoy encountered a severe storm which was quite likely a hurricane. The Sea Venture separated from the rest of the convoy, ultimately coming aground on the island of Bermuda, where it was stranded for months. The Faulcon continued, reaching Jamestown in August 1609.

== Arrival in Jamestown ==
Temperance Barrow arrived in Jamestown just before the winter of the Starving Time, an extraordinarily harsh winter which the majority of townspeople did not survive. As provisions grew scarce, some thirty colonists tried to steal corn from the Powhatan natives, but most of the men were slain during the attempt, only two escaping. The stores had been eaten by the colonial leaders and lost to raids and the colonists subsisted on what they could gather. By the end of the winter, only about sixty remained of the five hundred English.

In May 1610, the survivors of the Sea Venture finally arrived. Sir Thomas Gates took control as the new Lieutenant-Governor and decided to abandon the town, but as the ships were sailing away, they encountered three ships, loaded with supplies for Jamestown. They all returned to Jamestown.

== Family and marriages ==
Temperance Flowerdew was the daughter of Anthony Flowerdew, of Hethersett, Norfolk, and his wife Martha Stanley (d. 1626) of Scottow, Norfolk. Her paternal grandparents were William Flowerdew and Frances Appleyard. Frances Appleyard was the elder half-sister of Amy Robsart, first wife of Robert Dudley, 1st Earl of Leicester.

=== First marriage ===
Flowerdew married Richard Barrow on April 29, 1609 at St Gregory by St Paul's, London, by licence a month before the Falcon left Plymouth on 2 June 1609. The Barrows were a prominent family in Temperance’s native Norfolk.

The next we hear of Flowerdew is in a 1623/4 list of the colony of Virginia's inhabitants who survived the 1622 Indian attack. On A List of Names of the Living in Virginia, February the 16th, 1623/4, we find Temperance, Lady Yeardley, her husband Sir George Yeardley, and their three children, Elizabeth, Argall and Francis Yeardley.

The accepted date of marriage by genealogists is that on 18 October 1618 Flowerdew married George Yeardley. Exactly a month later he was appointed to serve three years as governor of Virginia, and was knighted by James VI and I during an audience at Newmarket on 24 November.

The source of the date seems unclear. The year 1618 for their marriage crops up as early as 1912. It may simply be based on daughter Elizabeth's year of birth. The year 1618 seems to be conjecture by James P. C. Southall in his 1947 article Concerning George Yardley and Temperance Flowerdew: A Synopsis and Review. According to the same source, Yeardley «went to England in the latter half of the year 1617 and was absent from Virginia during whole of the following year 1618.»

In the 24 January 1624/5 census of the inhabitants of Virginia, known as the Muster, the Flowerdew's oldest child Elizabeth is six years old, and "borne heare". This would mean that Elizabeth was born after 24 January 1618 and before 25 January 1619.

The couple had three children:

- Elizabeth Yeardley (1618/9–1660).
- Argall Yeardley (1620/1–1655).
- Francis Yeardley (1623/4–1655)

=== Third marriage ===
Yeardley died on November 13, 1627. On March 31, 1628, Flowerdew married his successor, Governor Francis West.

Flowerdew died in December of the same year, leaving her three children, aged 5, 8, and 10, as orphans, the estate she had inherited from Yeardley was divided among their three children. Yeardley's brother, Ralph Yeardley, became trustee for the property. Governor West went to London to contest the will, but failed in the effort.

== Flowerdew Hundred ==
In 1619, her husband George Yeardley patented 1,000 acres (4.0 km^{2}) of land on Mulberry Island. He owned another private plantation upriver on the south side of the James River opposite Tanks Weyanoke, named Flowerdew Hundred. However, the land appears to have been in use by Stanley Flowerdew, Yeardley's brother-in-law, before it was patented by Yeardley. Although George Yeardley acquired the thousand acres that he named Flowerdew Hundred in 1619, it seems very likely that some settlement had begun there before that date, for his brother-in-law Stanley Flowerdew took a shipment of tobacco to England in the same year, probably grown on the same property. With a population of about thirty, Flowerdew Hundred Plantation was economically successful with thousands of pounds of tobacco produced along with corn, fish and livestock. In 1621 Yeardley paid 120 pounds (possibly a hogshead of tobacco) to build the first windmill in British America. The windmill was an English post design and was transferred by deed in the property's 1624 sale to Abraham Piersey, a Cape Merchant of the London Company. The plantation survived the 1622 onslaught of Powhatan Indians, losing only six people. The plantation may have been associated with the Flowerdew name before Yeardley's patent. Note that Yeardley named his Mulberry Island plantation "Stanley Hundred".

In 1624, Yeardley sold Flowerdew Hundred to Abraham Piersey, and the deed from that sale is said to be the oldest in America.
