= Joan Wright =

American woman, first person accused of witchcraft in American Colonies

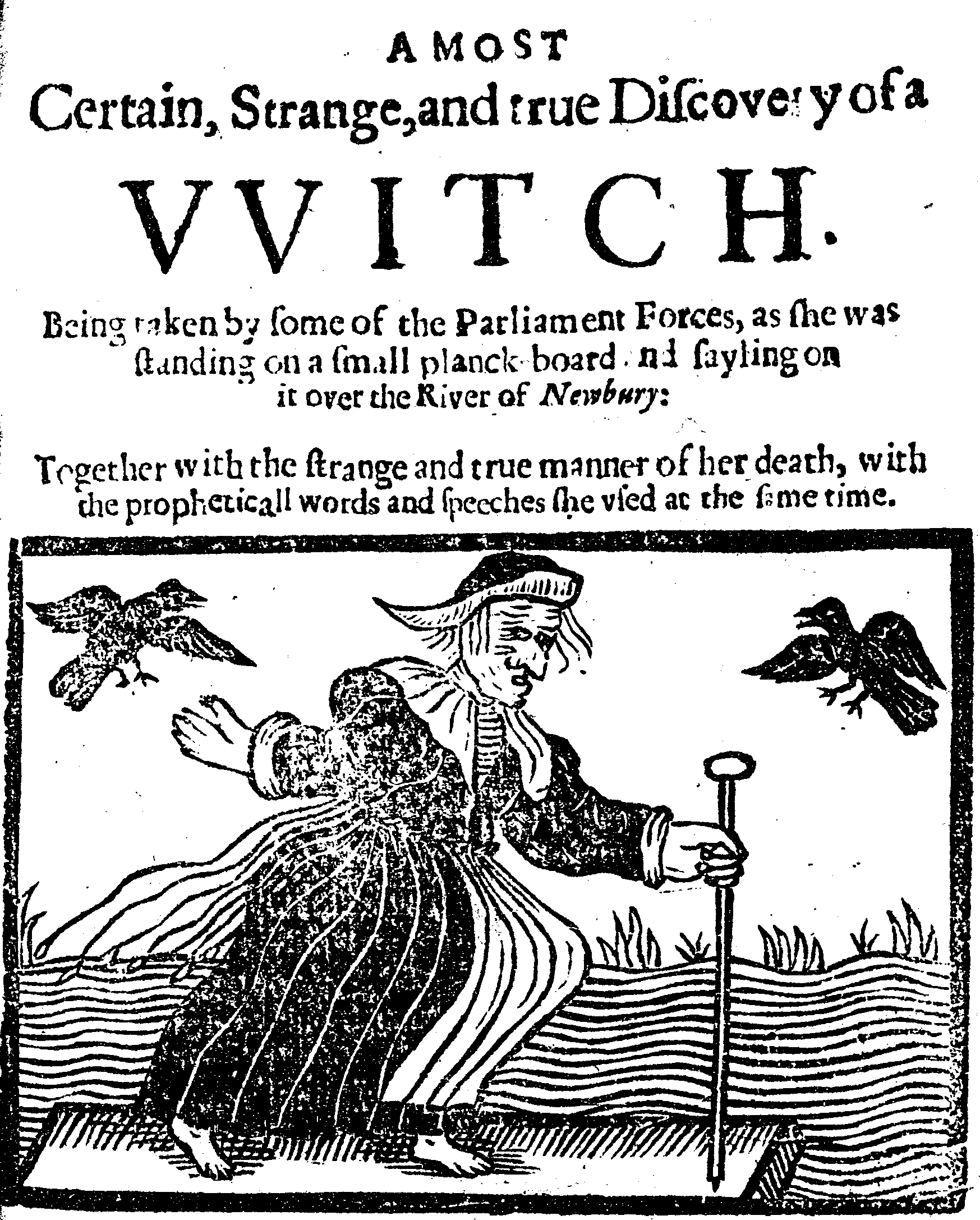
17th Century periodical about Witchcraft

Goodwife Joan Wright (born c. 1596, date of death unknown), sometimes "Jane Wright" and called ''Surry's Witch," is the first person known to have been legally accused of witchcraft in any British North American colony.

== Background ==
Joan (or Jane) Wright was born around 1596 in Hull, Yorkshire, England. In 1610, she married Robert Wright, and they later emigrated to the Colony of Virginia, originally living in Elizabeth City. They had two sons, William and Robert. She was a self-professed healer and described as a "cunning" woman, the term used for those who practiced "low-level" or "folk" magic. She was also left-handed, which deemed her untrustworthy and suspicious by the day's standards. Wright lived and worked as a midwife in Surry County and was referred to as "Goodwife Wright".

== Witch trial ==
In 1626, the Allington family refused to have Wright as their midwife because she was left-handed. The mother fell ill with a breast infection and the newborn baby died shortly after it was born. Quickly, the family and neighbors began to accuse Wright of the infant's demise.

On September 11, 1626, Wright was called before the General Court of Virginia in Jamestown, Virginia on the charge of witchcraft. The presiding judge of her hearing was Sir George Yeardley, the Colonial Governor of Virginia. The formal accusation and investigatory hearing of Wright is the earliest witchcraft allegation on record against an English settler in any British North American colony.

The court heard extensive testimony during the inquiry. Her accusers claimed that she had cursed their local livestock and crops, caused a heavy rainfall, bewitched their butter churns, accurately predicted the deaths of several of her neighbors, and cast a spell that caused the death of a newborn baby. During the inquiry, Wright did nothing to dispute the charges of witchcraft, and, in some instances, subtly encouraged this belief.

=== Outcome ===
It is believed that Wright was acquitted despite her admission that she did possess basic knowledge of witchcraft practices. In her response to her charges, she remarked, "God forgive them." Available court records do not describe how the hearing ended, and there is no surviving record of a sentence.

== Legacy ==
A Virginia witch trial loosely based on the story of Joan Wright is featured in a 2017 episode of the British drama television series Jamestown.

In 2019, an original play, "Season of the Witch" premiered at the Jamestown Settlement. The play is a dramatic retelling of the witch trials in Virginia, with a focus on the story of Wright.
