= John Pory =

English politician, administrator, traveller and author

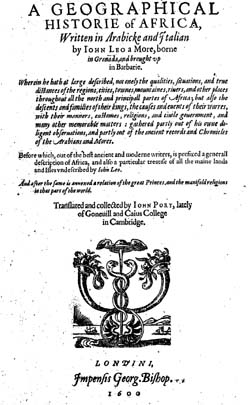
- The title page of Pory's translation of Leo Africanus's A Geographical Historie of Africa (1600)
- Born: 1572; Thompson, Norfolk, Kingdom of England
- Died: 1633 (aged 60–61); England
- Occupations: Government administrator, traveller, author, journalist
- Writing career
- Period: 1600–1633
- Subjects: Exploration, geography, travel

John Pory (b. 1572–d. 1633) was an English politician, administrator, traveller, and author during the Jacobean and Caroline eras; the skilled linguist may have been the first news correspondent in English-language journalism. As the first Speaker of the Virginia General Assembly, Pory established parliamentary procedures for that legislative body still in use today (although members now elect their Speaker).

== Early life and education ==
Pory was the son of William Pory (d. 1606?) of Butters Hall, Thompson, Norfolk. John Pory was baptised on 16 March 1572.

Pory was educated at Gonville and Caius College, Cambridge; he earned his bachelor's degree in 1592 and his Masters in 1595.

== Politician and traveller ==
Elected a member of Parliament from the borough of Bridgwater in 1605, Pory served until 1610.

In 1607 Pory travelled through France and the Low Countries, and was involved in a plan to introduce silkworm breeding to England. He spent the years 1611–1616 travelling through Europe, to Italy and as far as Istanbul, where Pory was the secretary of English ambassador Sir Paul Pindar. For a portion of 1617 Pory served as the secretary to the English ambassador to Savoy, Sir Isaac Wake.

In 1619, Pory travelled to the barely decade old English colony in Virginia as secretary to the new governor, Sir George Yeardley. On 30 July, 1619, Gov. Yeardley convened what would be the first session of the Virginia General Assembly in Jamestown, after he and Pory agreed upon an agenda and convened to burgesses from each town. Yeardley also appointed Pory Speaker, and Pory acted as the convocation's secretary, appointing committees to study important questions and report back, as well as establishing rules modelled on those in Parliament. Pory would spend the years 1619–1621 and 1623–1624 in Virginia. He explored Chesapeake Bay by boat in 1620, but in 1624 returned to England and settled in London permanently. He would later publish significant narratives about the Jamestown colony in Virginia, and the Plymouth Colony in Massachusetts.

Early in his career, around 1597, Pory became an associate and protégé of the geographer and author Richard Hakluyt; Hakluyt later termed Pory his "very honest, industrious, and learned friend". Pory was also a friend of Sir Robert Cotton, William Camden, Sir Dudley Carleton, and other members their circles. It was at Hakluyt's urging that Pory engaged in his first literary effort, a translation of a geographic work by Leo Africanus that was published as A Geographical Historie of Africa (1600).

== News ==
In London from the early 1620s on, Pory helped Nathaniel Butter, who was creating news periodicals for the English public. Headquartered at Butter's shop at the sign of the Pied Bull, Pory was a "correspondent" in the literal sense, who maintained exchanges of letters with the wide variety of prominent people he had met and cultivated in his earlier public career. Other similarly-situated men of his generation, like John Chamberlain, played comparable roles in such correspondences and exchanges of news; Pory was atypical and perhaps unique in that he channelled his knowledge and contacts into commercial news ventures, Butter's early newspapers. Pory also ran his own manuscript news service, charging patrons for regular news reports; Viscount Scudamore paid Pory £20 for an annual subscription of weekly bulletins for the year 1632.

Pory moved among official posts, journalism, and positions in the private sector. He had acquaintances with people in a range of positions, and maintained a correspondence with influential persons during his later years. Contemporaries, however, described him as addicted to gossip and alcohol.

== Influences and connections ==
Modern scholars who have studied Pory's published works and his correspondence have unearthed a range of linkages with important figures of his era, like John Donne and John Milton. Shakespeare may have borrowed from Pory's book on Africa for his Othello; Ben Jonson used it for The Masque of Blackness. Pory's extant correspondence provides researchers with a wealth of detail about London and Court society in the period. He describes, among other things, the last hours of Sir Walter Raleigh, and brawls between nobles at the Blackfriars Theatre.

Pory was buried on 26 July 1633.

== Bibliography ==
- Powell, William Stevens (1977), John Pory, 1572–1636: The Life and Letters of a Man of Many Parts, Chapel Hill, N.C.: University of North Carolina Press, ISBN 978-0-8078-1271-6.

Included in the back pocket are 6 microfiches (393 p.) containing an annotated anthology of his letters and other minor writings.
