= Tobacco Inspection Act =

Legislation enacted to improve the quality of tobacco exported from Virginia

Virginia General Assembly
- Long title: An Act for amending the Staple of Tobacco; and for preventing Frauds in his Majesty’s Customs
- Citation: 3 & 4 Geo. 3. c. 3
- Enacted by: Virginia General Assembly

The Tobacco Inspection Act of 1730 (popularly known as the Tobacco Inspection Act) was a 1730 law of the Virginia General Assembly designed to improve the quality of tobacco exported from Colonial Virginia. Proposed by Virginia Lieutenant Governor Sir William Gooch, the law was far-reaching in impact in part because it gave warehouses the power to destroy substandard crops and issue bills of exchange that served as currency. The law centralized the inspection of tobacco at 40 locations described in the law.

The 1730 warehouse law built on prior laws. The warehouse act of 1712 provided for the regulation of public warehouses. This warehouse act was amended in 1720 giving the county courts the authority to order warehouses inconvenient to the landings discontinued.

== Public warehouses ==
The book Tobacco in Colonial Virginia ("The Sovereign Remedy") by Melvin Herndon describes operation of the public warehouses as follows:

In 1730 the most comprehensive inspection bill ever introduced, passed the General Assembly. The common knowledge that the past and present inspection laws had failed to prevent the importation of unmarketable tobacco, plus a long depression, had changed the attitude of many of the influential planters and merchants. Nevertheless, the act did meet with opposition from some of the English customs officials and a few of the large planters. Soon after the passage of this new inspection law a prominent planter wrote complainingly to a London merchant, "This Tobo hath passed the Inspection of our new law, every hogshead was cased and viewed by which means the tobacco was very much tumbled and made something less sightly than it was before and it causes a great deal of extraordinary trouble". There were complaints that the new law destroyed tobacco that used to bring good money. Still another planter complained that the planter's name and evidence on the hogshead had much more effect on the price of the tobacco than the inspector's brand. While some of the planters expressed their disapproval of the new inspection law verbally, others resorted to violence. During the first year some villains burned two inspection houses, one in Lancaster County and another in Northumberland.

The inspection law passed in 1730 was frequently amended during the colonial period, but there were no changes in its essential features. The act provided that no tobacco was to be shipped except in hogsheads, cases, or casks, without having first passed an inspection at one of the legally established inspection warehouses; thus the shipment of bulk tobacco was prohibited. Two inspectors were employed at each warehouse, and a third was summoned in case of a dispute between the two regular inspectors. These officials were bonded and were forbidden under heavy penalties to pass bad tobacco, engage in the tobacco trade, or to take rewards. Tobacco offered in payment of debts, public or private, had to be inspected under the same conditions as that to be exported. The inspectors were required to open the hogshead, extract and carefully examine two samplings; all trash and unsound tobacco was to be burned in the warehouse kiln in the presence and with the consent of the owner. If the owner refused consent the entire hogshead was to be destroyed. After the tobacco was sorted, the good tobacco was repacked in the hogshead and the planter's distinguishing mark, net weight, tare (weight of the hogshead), and name of inspection warehouse were stamped on the hogshead.

== Inspection locations ==
The law dictated that public warehouses should be set up at the following locations:

XLIII. And for settling the number of public warehouses, and appointing the places where the same shall be kept, pursuant to this act, Be it enacted and declared, That a public warehouse or warehouses shall be kept, and the same are hereby appointed to be kept at the following places, to wit:

For the counties of Goochland, and Henrico; at Warwick, upon Howlet's land; and Shockoe's upon Col. Byrd's land, under one inspection.
At Bermuda Hundred, upon William Eppes's lots; and Turkey Island, upon Col. Randolph's land, in Henrico county, another inspection.
In Prince George; at Appamatox Point, upon Col. Bolling's land; on Col. Robert Mumford's land; and Powel's Creek; upon Mr. Bland's land, under one inspection.
At Cabbin Point, in Surry; and Merchants Brandon, in Prince George County, under one inspection.
At Gray's Creek, in Surry, where the Agents houses were, and Warricksqueak Bay, in Isle of Wight County, under one inspection.
At Swineherd's and Mr. John Soan's, in Charles City County, under one inspection.
At Waynwright's Landing, Isle of Wight; and Laurence's, in Nansemond County, under one inspection.
At the widow Constance's, at Sleepy-Hole Point, in Nansemond County, under one inspection.
At Norfolk Town, upon the fort land, in the County of Norfolk; and Kemp's Landing, in Princess Anne, under one inspection.
At Hampton, in Elizabeth City, upon Mr. Miles's lot, at Warwick Town, in the County of Warwick, upon Mr. Gough's lots; and at Charles river, Roe's storehouse, in the county of York, under one inspection.
At Hog-Neck, in James City County; and at Taskanask, in New Kent, upon William Morris's land;
and the Colledge, and Capitol landings, upon Mr. Holloway's land, under one inspection.
At the town of York, where the agents house was; and at Gloucester town, upon capt. Hannar's land, under one inspection.
At Deacon's Neck, and Poropotank, in Gloucester County, where the agents house was, under one inspection.
At Crutchfield's, upon Col. Page's land; and Mr. David Merriwether's in Hanover County, under one inspection.
At Todd's, in King and Queen; and Aylett's warehouse, in King William County, under one inspection.
At John Quarle's in King William; and at Mantapike, and Shepherd's in King and Queen County, under one inspection.
At Chamberlain's in New Kent; and Williams's ferry, in King William, under one inspection.
At Urbanna, where the agents house was; and major Kemp's, in Middlesex County, under one inspection.
At Hobb's Hole, upon the lands of James Griffin; and at Bowler's ferry, upon Adams's land, in Essex, under one inspection.
At Naylor's Hole, upon William Fantleroy's land, where his prise houses now are; and the mouth of Totaskey, at Newman Brokenborough's landing, in Richmond County; both under one inspection.
At Layton's, in Essex; upon Maddox Creek, at Martin's, in Westmoreland; and Bray's Church, in King George County, under one inspection.
At Falmouth, upon Mr. Todd's lots in King George; and at Fredericksburg, upon Mr. Francis Willis's lots, in Spotsylvania County, under one inspection.
At William Glascock's landing, in Richmond; and at the Rolling House, upon Deep Creek, in Lancaster County, under one inspection.
At Corotoman, at Queen's Town, where the agents houses were; and on the land where the widow Davis lives, in Lancaster; and the Indian Creek, at the warehouses, in Northumberland County, under one inspection.
At Wiccocomico, at Robert Jones's; and at Coan, at the warehouses in Northumberland, under one inspection.
At Nominy, upon Patrick Spence's land; and Yeo-comico, at the warehouse, in Westmoreland County, under one inspection.
At Boyd's Hole, upon col. Fitzhugh's land; and Marlborough Town, in Stafford County, under one inspection.
At Quantico, upon Robert Brent's land; and great Hunting Creek, upon Broadwater's land, in Prince William County, under one inspection.
At John Roy's and Mr. Francis Conway's in Caroline, and at Gibson's in King George county, under one inspection.
At Cherrystone's, at John Watersons; at Nasswaddock's, at the Joiner's landing; and at Hungers, at George Harmanson's, in Northampton County, under one inspection.
On the head of Pungoteague, at Addison's landing; at Pitt's landing, upon Pokomoke; at Guilford, at Mr. Andrew's warehouse landing, in the county of Accomack, under one inspection.

== See also ==
Tobacco in the American Colonies
