= Nathaniel Powell =

English soldier and politician in Virginia (died 1622)

- Born: 1587; St Olave, Surrey, England
- Died: March 22, 1622 (aged 34–35); Jamestown, Virginia Colony
- Cause of death: Murder
- Occupations: Cartographer, military leader, politician
- Spouse: Joyce Tracy
- Relatives: William Powell (cousin); Ralph Hamor (cousin)

Member of the Virginia Governor's Council
- In office April 19, 1619 – March 22, 1622
- Governor: George Yeardley; Francis Wyatt

Acting Governor of Virginia
- In office April 9, 1619 – April 19, 1619
- Preceded by: Samuel Argall
- Succeeded by: George Yeardley

Military service
- Branch/service: British Army (before 1607); Virginian militia (1617–1623)
- Rank: Captain (in England); Sergeant major general (in Virginia)

Nathaniel Powell (1587 – March 22, 1622) was an English-born early American colonist, cartographer, military leader, and politician who served briefly as the acting governor of the colony of Virginia for a ten-day period in 1619. Powell's additional service in colonial Virginia included as president of the Virginia Governor's Council and as a delegate to the first session of the Virginia General Assembly. He contributed to John Smith's sixth chapter of The Generall Historie of Virginia and helped make the first map of Chesapeake Bay area.

== Early life ==
Powell was born in 1587, in Surrey, England and spent much of his early life as a planter. He served as an officer in the British Army, where he attained the rank of captain. He departed England aboard the Susan Constant on December 19, 1606 and arrived to Jamestown, Virginia in 1607.

== Virginia colonist ==
After arriving in Virginia in April 1607 as one of the original settlers, Powell joined Captain Smith and Christopher Newport in their explorations of the York River and Chesapeake Bay, including meeting with Powhatan in February 1608. During this period, Powell mapped the bay and surrounding rivers.

Powell was highly active in the political and military affairs of the colony. In 1608, he was an investor in the Virginia Company. He contributed to John Smith's History of Virginia and helped make the first map of Virginia. In 1609-1610, Powell remained in Jamestown during the Starving Time, one of the deadliest periods in the colony’s history. In 1609, Powell and Anas Todkill took part in an unsuccessful expedition to locate surviving colonists of the Roanoke Colony, at the personal request of governor Thomas Gates.

In June 1610, Powell was present at the reading of the First Virginia Charter in Jamestown. Powell was also an attendee at the wedding of Pocahontas and John Rolfe in 1614.

In October 1617, Governor Samuel Argall commissioned Powell as Sergeant-Major General to Francis West, which was the highest military office in the colony at the time, akin to a modern-day general. Shortly thereafter, Powell served as deputy governor of Virginia. From April 9 to April 19, 1619, Powell succeeded departing governor Argall to serve as acting governor of Virginia Colony before the arrival of George Yeardley. Powell resided in Charles City during this period.

During his ten day tenure as acting governor, Powell oversaw the arrival of fifty emigrants, including Captain John Warde, and Reverend Thomas Bargrave, who would form a settlement known as Ward's Creek.

From 1619 until 1622, Powell served as a member of the Virginia Governor's Council, including as president due to his tenure.

In July 1619, Powell served as a delegate to the first session of the House of Burgesses - the first representative legislative body in British America. In January 1620, Powell was among the signatories of a letter to Virginia Company officials about the importance of tobacco in the economy of the Virginia Colony.

Powell was a prominent landowner, owning a 600-acre estate known as the Powellbrooke Plantation.

== Death ==
During the Jamestown massacre, on March 22, 1622, Powell and his pregnant wife were killed by the Powhatan Confederacy chief Opechancanough. He was 34 or 35 years old.

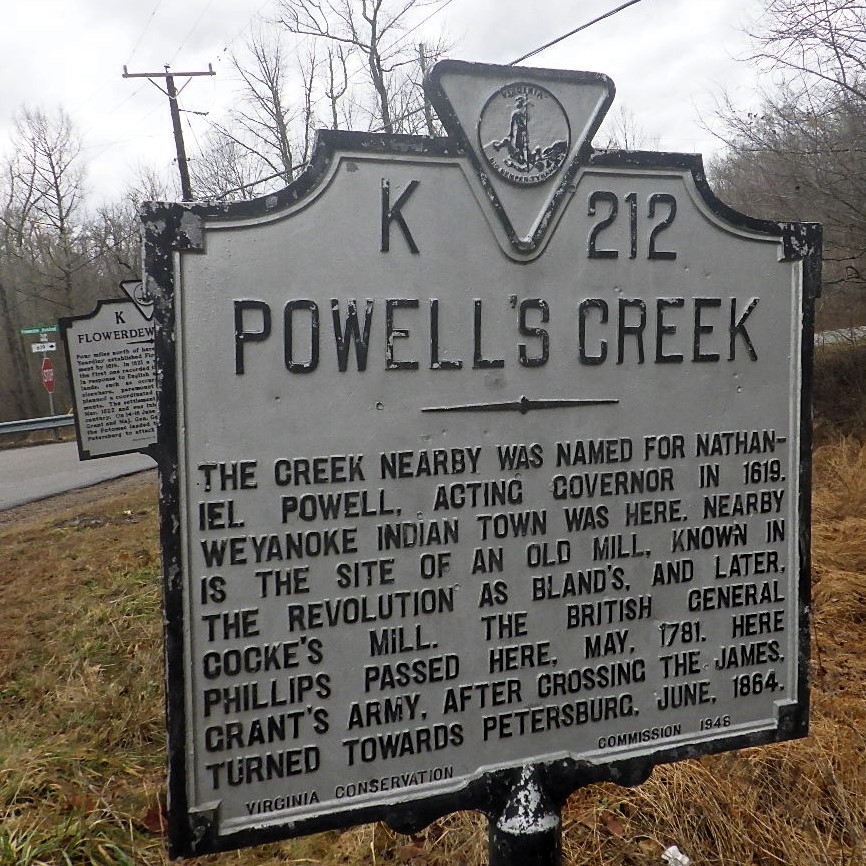
Powell's Creek Historical Marker

=== Legacy ===
After his murder, John Smith wrote of Powell that he was "one of the first planters, a valiant soldier, and not any in the country better known amongst them".

Powell is the namesake of Powell's Creek in Prince George County, Virginia. The site of Powell's plantation is now part of the James River National Wildlife Refuge. A plaque in honor of Powell was erected at the rebuilt Jamestown Church by the Society of Colonial Dames, and a silver plate in honor of Powell was dedicated by the Martin's Brandon Church in 1857.

Powell is included as a character in Marilyn Clay's 2013 historical fiction novel, Deceptions. His map of Virginia is in the permanent collection of the British Museum in London. "Nathaniel Powell Road" in Williamsburg is named for Powell.

== Works ==
- The Generall Historie of Virginia, New-England, and the Summer Isles, 1624. (listed as co-author of chapter six)

Government offices
Preceded by Samuel Argall	Acting Colonial Governor of Virginia; 1619	Succeeded by George Yeardley
