= William Powell (Virginia colonist) =

Virginia colonist

Lieutenant Governor William Powell
- Born: c. 1577/1585; Kingdom of England
- Died: 1623; Colony of Virginia
- Other name: William Poole
- Occupations: Burgess, Militia officer, Ancient planter
- Spouse: Margaret Powell

Member Virginia House of Burgesses
- In office 1619–1619

Military service
- Branch/service: James City County, Virginia militia
- Years of service: About 1611 to 1622
- Rank: Captain

William Powell (b. before 1586 – d. January 1623), was an early Virginia colonist, landowner, militia officer and legislator. Considered an ancient planter for living in the Virginia colony during its first decade, he was one of two representatives from what became James City County, Virginia in the first Virginia House of Burgesses in 1619. His former plantation, now across the James River in Surry County, Virginia is now within Chippokes State Park.

== Early life in England ==
Sources conflict as to whether William Powell was born in 1577 or 1585 or whether these were the years of birth of one or two other men of the same name. Although his date of birth is uncertain, the colonist William Powell obviously was born in England.

== Settlement in Virginia ==
William Powell arrived in Jamestown, Virginia between 1608 and 1610. The surname "Powell" was common, (Note: Other Powells and Pooles were Captain Nathaniel Powell (gentleman and original settler), John Powell (a tailor from the First Supply), and Thomas Powell (a cook on the Sea Venture)), and several "ancient" colonists had similar names (including Poole). In 1608, a "Master Powell, tradesman" arrived in October, 1608, with the Second Supply aboard the Mary and Margaret. It is more likely that Powell, described as a gentleman, arrived in the Third Supply mission of nine ships, which some arrived in August, 1609 after a major tropical storm. Another source states that the records of the Virginia Company showed that William Powell, a subscriber of the company, came to Virginia in May 1611 [O.S. May, 1610] with Lieutenant Governor Sir Thomas Gates aboard the Sea Venture. These statements are not entirely incompatible. The small ships of the Third Supply mission arrived in Jamestown in 1609 and Powell, who is identified as being in Jamestown before May 1610, must have been on one of those ships, which returned from Virginia to England by November, 1609.

The Sea Venture, with Sir Thomas Gates and other prominent passengers, was beached in Bermuda after being caught in a severe tropical storm and separated from the other Third Supply ships. The surviving passengers did not arrive in Jamestown until late May 1610, after being stranded in Bermuda for 42 weeks. The castaways had to build two small vessels from remains of the Sea Venture and cedar trees in order to complete their journey.

On February 9, 1610, (Note: Tyler gives a February 9, 1611 date. Although this does not correlate with an earlier presence of Powell in Virginia, it would not require Powell to have been in Virginia before the arrival of the Sea Venture passengers. On the other hand, Powell's name is not on the extant partial lists of Sea Venture passengers and the date could be equivalent to 1610 because of the peculiarities of the Old Style and New Style calendar that was still in use at that time.) the Acting Governor Captain John Percy sent "Ensign Powell" and Ensign Waller to capture, or kill if necessary, Wochinchopunck, the chief of the Paspahegh and a sub-chief or tributary of the Powhatan. The chief had been harassing and even killing colonists. He even had tried to kill Captain John Smith during the previous year but Smith subdued him and took him prisoner, only to have him later escape. Finding they could not capture the strong Wochinchopunck, Powell killed him with a sword. Lieutenant Puttock, who had been closely following Powell and Waller, killed one of the chief's men.

Deputy Governor Samuel Argall appointed William Powell as captain, responsible for the Jamestown defenses and its blockhouses, and further appointed him lieutenant governor in 1617. Powell was a member of the first Virginia House of Burgesses in 1619, representing James City County, Virginia. Powell lived on the "Surry side" of James City County, on the south side of the James River from Jamestown, Virginia. Surry County, Virginia was organized from this area in 1652.

In 1620, Argall contracted with, or possibly even ordered, Powell to clear land and build houses for new colonists at Martin's Hundred. Powell tried to force the newcomers to pay for the work, but they were able to show this would be unjust because Argall had actually put their site in the wrong location.

In April 1622, soon after the Indian massacre of 1622, Captain Powell established, or at least secured rights to, property in order to establish a large plantation on the Chickahominy River. Richard Pace, an ancient planter, had 10 shares in this enterprise but soon ceded them to Captain Powell. William Powell himself was an ancient planter.

== Militia leader ==
Captain Powell, who was described as the "gunner" of James City County, was one of a few who received early word of the planned colonist massacre and was "instrumental in giving warning to the plantations nearest Jamestown." Most sources state that the friendly Native American ("Chanco") who gave warning of the impending attacks told Richard Pace of the planned attack. As Powell and Pace lived near each other and were business associates, it appears that Pace warned Powell and that both men proceeded to warn other people in the neighborhood of Jamestown, as stated in William Stith's 1740 history of the colony. Immediately after the attack, Powell went to Martin's Hundred to help evacuate the survivors. He took possession of the estate of Nathaniel Powell, who was killed along with his wife during the attack. It was later determined Powell was not related to Nathaniel as he had claimed. Nathaniel's older brother, Thomas Powell, succeeded to ownership of the property.

Soon after beginning the Chickahominy River enterprise mentioned above, Captain William Powell was killed leading a party of militia against the Native Americans (Indians). The militia were seeking revenge for the March massacre. Captain William Powell, as he is identified in the list of Burgesses, may have died in late 1622 or possibly in January 1623. A letter of January 24, 1623 from colonist John Harrison to his brother, Richard Harrison, states that Captain Powell, and others, were dead.

== Aftermath ==
In 1620, Powell and another colonist named John Smith took some land on Hog Island, which they shared with Captain Samuel Mathews. After Powell's death, in June 1625, a controversy arose between Captain Samuel Mathews, father of future royal governor of Virginia Samuel Mathews, and the children of Captain William Powell, deceased, over a grant of land on the south side of the James River across from Jamestown, Virginia. Mathews relinquished his claim before the end of the year. He had additional land on the north side at the mouth of the Warwick River where he established a prominent plantation known as "Denbigh Plantation," originally known as "Mathews Manor."

On a date between March 4, 1626 and the end of 1628, Edward Blaney, one of James City County's burgesses in 1623, married Margaret Powell, the widow of Captain Powell. Like Powell, Blaney lived on the south side or "Surry side" of James City County, across the James River from Jamestown, Virginia.

== See also ==
- List of members of the Virginia House of Burgesses

== Notes ==
=== Sources ===
- Boddie, John Bennett. Colonial Surry. Richmond: Dietz Press, 1948. OCLC 6148616. Retrieved July 20, 2011.
- Boddie, John Bennett. Seventeenth century Isle of Wight County, Virginia: a history of the county of Isle of Wight, Virginia, during the seventeenth century, including abstracts of the county records. Chicago, Chicago Law Print. Co. 1938. OCLC 11904209. Retrieved July 20, 2011.
- Chandler, Julian Alvin Carroll and Travis Butler Thames. Colonial Virginia. Richmond, VA: Times-Dispatch Company, 1907. OCLC 554689. Retrieved July 21, 2011.
- Coldham, Peter Wilson. The complete book of emigrants, 1607-1660: a comprehensive listing compiled from English Public Records of those who took ship to the Americas for political, religious, and economic reasons; of those who were deported for vagrancy, roguery, or non-conformity; and of those who were sold to labour in the new colonies. Baltimore, Genealogical Publishing Co., 1987. ISBN 978-0-8063-1192-0. Retrieved July 21, 2011.
- Dorman, John Frederick. Adventurers of Purse and Person, Virginia, 1607-1624/5: Families G-P. Fourth Edition, Volume 2. Baltimore: Genealogical Publishing Company, 2005. ISBN 978-0-8063-1763-2. Retrieved July 21, 2011.
- Henry, William Wirt. The First Legislative Assembly in America. In Annual Report of the American Historical Association for the Year 1893. Washington, Government Printing Office, 1894. OCLC 1150082. Retrieved July 21, 2011.
- McCartney, Martha W. Virginia immigrants and adventurers, 1607-1635: a biographical dictionary. Baltimore: Genealogical Pub. Co., 2007. ISBN 978-0-8063-1774-8.
- Shomette, Donald G. Pirates of the Chesapeake, Centreville, MD: Tidewater Publishers, 1985. ISBN 978-0-87033-607-2.
- Stanard, William G. and Mary Newton Stanard. The Virginia Colonial Register. Albany, NY: Joel Munsell's Sons Publishers, 1902. OCLC 253261475, Retrieved July 15, 2011.
- Stith, William (1740). The History of the First Discovery and Settlement of Virginia. Reprinted for Joseph Sabin in 1865. Spartanburg, SC: Reprint Co., 1965. OCLC 3512595.
- Tyler, Lyon Gardiner. The cradle of the republic: Jamestown and James river. Richmond, VA: Hermitage Press, 1906. OCLC 2053984. Retrieved July 21, 2011.
