= Anas Todkill =

Virginia colonial soldier and explorer

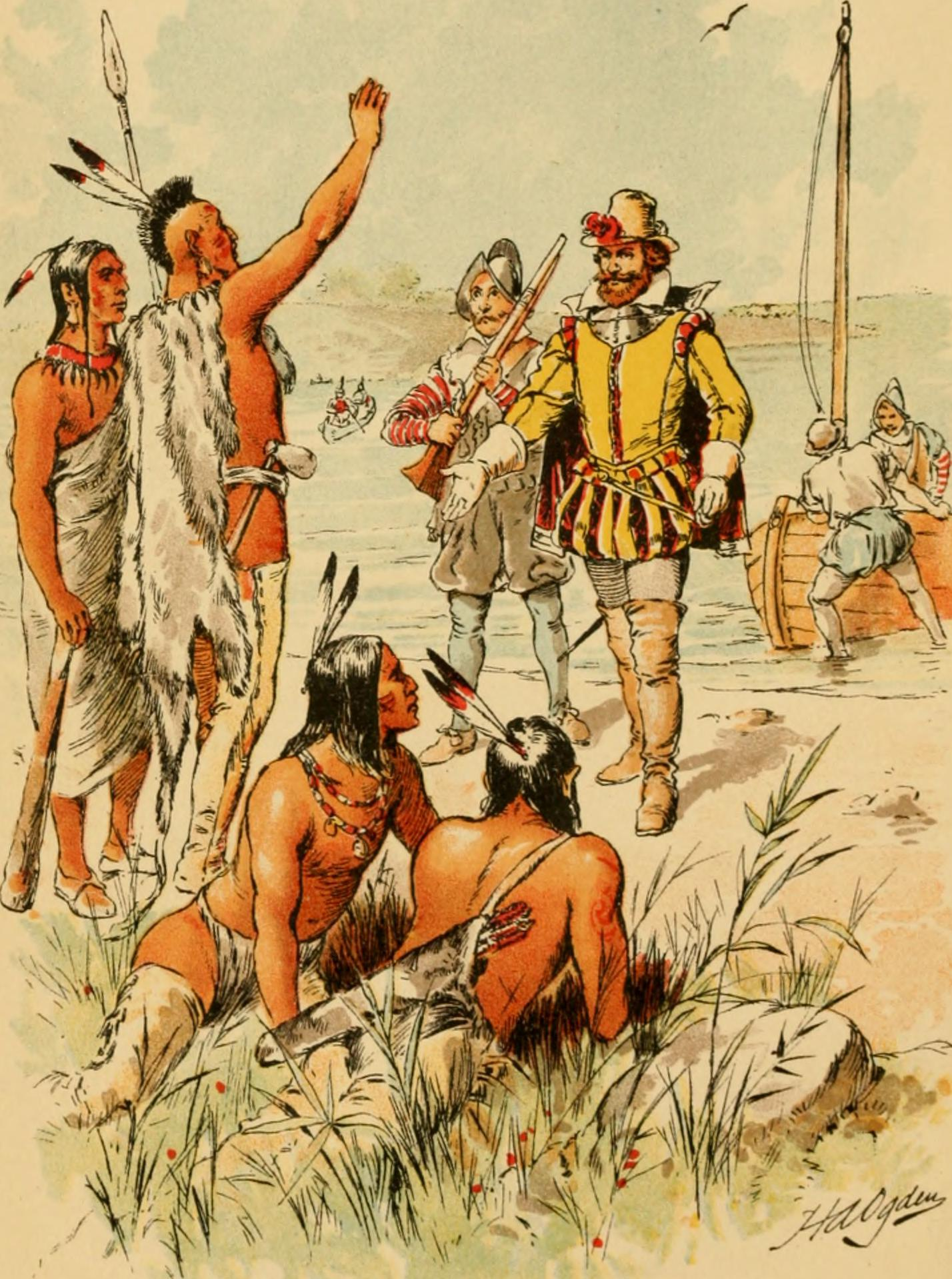
- Occupations: Domestic worker, soldier, carpenter

Anas Todkill (fl. 1607-1610) was an English-born early American carpenter, soldier, and manservant who accompanied Captain John Smith on each of his explorations of the Colony of Virginia.

== Biography ==
Todkill arrived with the original Jamestown fleet in 1607, as a servant of Captain John Martin. Todkill accompanied John Smith on several early voyages in Virginia, and his written accounts of their journeys are included in the published works of Smith. Todkill was the only colonist to accompany Smith on both of his Chesapeake Bay expeditions as well as the visit to Powhatan and the Pamunkey confrontation. Todkill was briefly held captive but released at the urging of Pocahontas. In 1609, Todkill and Nathaniel Powell took part in an unsuccessful expedition to locate surviving colonists of the Roanoke Colony, at the personal request of governor Thomas Gates.

Todkill returned to England by the 1610s.

=== Legacy ===
The writings of Todkill describing a dance given by the women of Powhatan's camp has been suggested by historians as a possible basis for the "living Drolerie" as portrayed in Act III of the Shakespeare play The Tempest. The 1885 novel My Lady Pokahontas was written by John Esten Cooke and published with Todkill listed as the author. Cooke published a short story titled Pokahontas at Court which also listed Todkill as the author/narrator.

A historic reenactment and program at Colonial Williamsburg portrays Todkill.

== Works ==
- The Generall Historie of Virginia, New-England, and the Summer Isles, 1624. (listed as co-author of chapter five)
- A map of Virginia: With a description of the countrey, the commodities, people, government and religion. VVritten by Captaine Smith, sometimes governour of the countrey. Whereunto is annexed the proceedings of those colonies, since their first departure from England, with the discourses, orations, and relations of the salvages, and the accidents that befell them in all their iournies and discoveries. Taken faithfully as they were written out of the writings of Doctor Russell. Tho. Studley. Anas Todkill. Ieffra Abot. Richard Wiefin. Will. Phettiplace. Nathaniel Povvell. Richard Pots. And the relations of divers other diligent observers there present then, and now many of them in England. Oxford: Printed by Joseph Barnes. 1612. Quarto. Arber 1910, pp. I:41–174 Edited by W[illiam] S[immonds]. An abridged edition was printed in Purchas 1625, pp. IV:1691–1704.
