= Hungars =

Hungars may refer to:

- Hungars Church, a historic Episcopal church in Bridgetown, Northampton County, Virginia, US
- Hungars Point, Virginia, an unincorporated community in Northampton County, Virginia, US
