= Maycock Plantation =

Settlement in colonial Virginia, US

Coordinates: 37°17′38″N 77°8′52″W

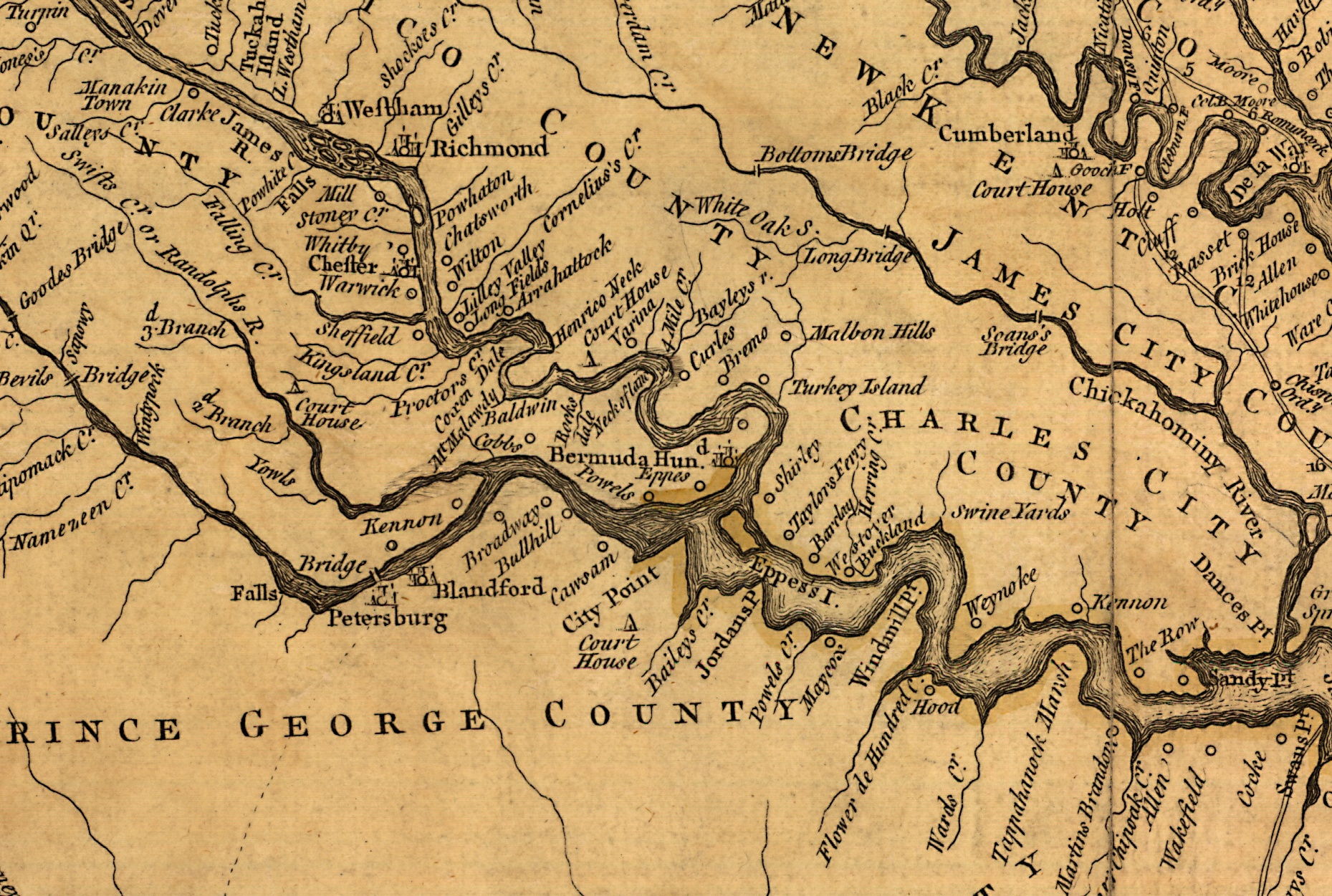
Powell's Creek shown on the Fry-Jefferson map (1752) between Jordan's Point and the Maycox (Maycock) Plantation

Maycock Plantation, also known as Maycock's Plantation and Maycox Plantation, among the first plantations on the south side of the James River in Prince George County, Virginia, was settled by Samuel Maycock about 1618 or 1619, during the early Colonial period of Virginia. The former plantation is now part of the James River National Wildlife Refuge, and is located off Flowerdew Hundred Road and James River Drive, Prince George, Virginia.

== Background ==
Before Jamestown was colonized in 1607, Weyanoke people and earlier Native Americans lived in the area from about 8,000 B.C. in what is now the James River National Wildlife Refuge. Seven archaeological sites show habitation from the Early Archaic through the Late Woodland periods. Artifacts include stone tools, projectile points, and ceramics. There is evidence of an agricultural culture. Their land was usurped by the English colonists. After decades of conflicts, known as the Anglo-Powhatan Wars, the Weyanoke people left the area in 1644. A ferry was established by 1705 at Maycock's Point to cross the James River. Soon after, the local economy was based upon corn and tobacco crops. There had been a mill on Powell's Creek, which was damaged during the Civil War, after which it was restored and operated for a few decades. By the early 1900s, much of what is now the refuge was wooded.

== Samuel Maycock ==
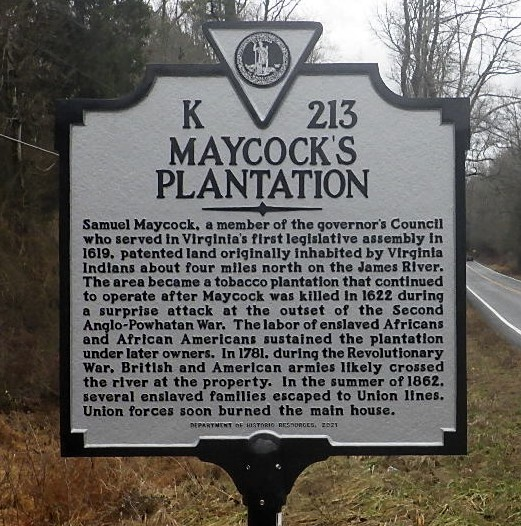
Maycock's Plantation historical marker

Samuel Maycock, born a gentleman, was a scholar of the University of Cambridge in England. In the Colony of Virginia, he sat on the Virginia Governor's Council. Maycock patented 1,700 acres for his plantation in 1618. He was working on the land on March 22, 1622, with Edward Lister (Note: Edward Lister came to Colonial America on the Mayflower in 1620. He may have been an indentured servant, with his passage from the Plymouth Colony to Jamestown in Colonial Virginia paid by Maycock.) and another man when they were massacred by Weyanoke people during the Indian massacre of 1622.

At the time, Maycock had an infant child named Sarah who survived the attack. There was not much work done on the plantation for several decades due to the threat of attack by Native Americans. In 1638, Sarah Maycock married George Pace, the son of Richard Pace. George, or his son Richard Pace II, is believed to have built the 17th-century house.

In 1970, an archaeological team led by Dr. Ben McCary and Dr. Norman Barka from College of William & Mary unearthed a foundation of a house built between 1640 and 1660. It is believed to have been a two-story house about 60 by 20 feet (18.3 by 6.1 m), with three rooms on each floor. Situated on a bluff, it was built upon a former Native American site of the Weyanoke people that overlooked the James River. It may have been destroyed in the Third Anglo-Powhatan War of 1644 or at another time by other means. Richard Pace lived at Maycock Plantation near Powells Creek in 1659. (Note: Tyler states that Sarah was Samuel's widow, rather than her daughter.)

== Subsequent owners ==
George Pace sold 800 to 900 acres in 1650 to Thomas Drew. Roger Drayton sold 250 acres to John Hamlin in 1696, who sold the land to Thomas Ravenscroft in 1723.

In 1772, acreage of various sizes on a seat called Maycox was put up for sale by George M. Meade and John Ravenscroft. The land was good for wheat and Indian corn.

== David Meade and the revolution ==
David Meade bought the plantation in 1774. The plantation's "long, narrow terraced raised walks that offered excellent viewing platforms, formed circulation routes through the landscape, and made ideal venues for social promenade," built according to François-Jean de Chastellux in residential settings, such as Vassall-Craigie-Longfellow House in Cambridge, Massachusetts and Maycock Plantation, in 18th-century America.

David Meade Jr. (1744–1830) lived there with his wife Sarah Waters Meade, the daughter of Sarah (née Prentis, 1749–1829) and William Waters, sometime after 1774, where he "dabbled in English-style garden design." Educated in England, he helped finance that American Revolution. Charles Cornwallis, commander of the British forces, crossed the James River in May 1781 and in August Anthony Wayne crossed the river near or at the plantation of 600 acres. Meade lived there until 1796, when he sold the plantation.

== Carter Bassett Harrison ==
In 1800, Carter Bassett Harrison settled in Prince George County, Virginia at Maycock Plantation (Maycox Plantation), along the James River. William Allen Harrison lived at Maycox Plantation. He died in 1824 and Carter Bassett Harrison inherited his father's plantation and 25 enslaved people according to William Allen Harrison's will dated May 22 of that year.

== Civil War ==
In 1864, Union General Ulysses S. Grant had a pontoon bridge built nearby to cross the river en route to the Siege of Petersburg.

== See also ==
- Mary Beaudry, archaeologist, study of shell-midden at Maycock Plantation
- List of plantations in Virginia
