= Merchant's Hope =

Historic church in Virginia, United States

Merchant's Hope was the name of a plantation and church established in the Virginia Colony in the 17th century. It was also the name of an English sailing ship, Merchant's Hope, which plied the Atlantic bringing emigrants to Virginia in the early 17th-century. The Merchant's Hope was owned by a man named William Barker who was a wealthy English merchant and mariner who patented land in Virginia.

== Merchant's Hope Plantation ==
Merchant's Hope Plantation was located west of Flowerdew Hundred on the south shore of the James River near the mouth of Powell's Creek in a portion of Charles City County which was divided to form Prince George County in 1703. It was located on the former site of Powellbrooke Plantation, whose owner Captain Nathaniel Powell (one of the original 1607 colonists), his wife, and ten others were killed during the Indian massacre of 1622.

Merchant's Hope Plantation was patented in 1638 by William Barker, Richard Quiney, and John Sadler, merchants of London. Ownership of the plantation passed to Nathaniel Harrison in 1720.

The 4,200 acre (17 km2) James River National Wildlife Refuge now encompasses much of the land that was Merchant's Hope Plantation during the 17th century.

== Merchant's Hope Church ==
- Merchant's Hope Church
- U.S. National Register of Historic Places
- Virginia Landmarks Register
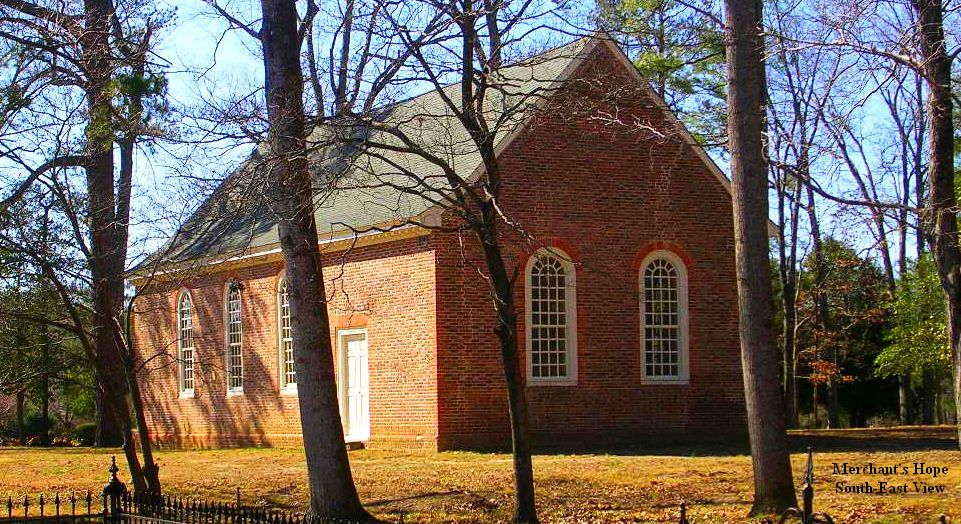
- Merchant's Hope Church

- Location within Virginia Location within the United States
- Location: West of the junction of Rte. 641 and VA 10, near Hopewell, Virginia
- Coordinates: 37.266025°N 77.202574°W
- Built: 1657/1743
- Architectural style: Georgian with Flemish bond brickwork
- NRHP reference No.: 69000274
- VLR No.: 074-0009

Significant dates
- Added to NRHP: October 8, 1969
- Designated VLR: November 5, 1968

Merchants Hope Church was established in 1657, and the current sanctuary was completed in 1743. Even though the church has undergone renovation and restoration, it is virtually the same structure today as it was when it was built over 250 years ago. In the 21st century, members of Merchant's Hope Episcopal Church still meet in the mid-18th-century structure, which is among the oldest Protestant churches in America still used as a house of worship.

The church is listed in the Virginia Landmarks Register and the National Register of Historic Places.

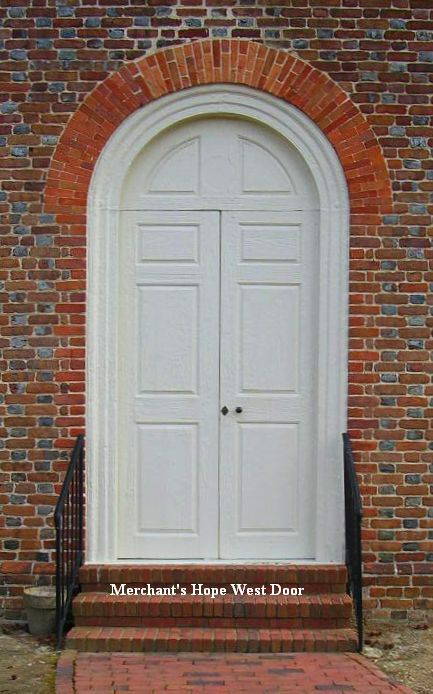
Compass Door: note rounded arch.

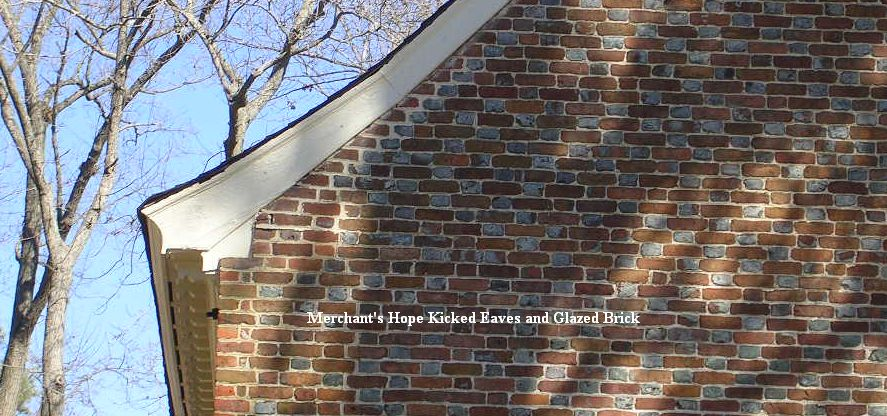
Kicked Eave on North West Corner

Dating The church has long been dated by local tradition and a date reputedly carved on one of the roof trusses to 1657, Upton ascribes a date of circa 1725, but recent dendrochronological studies of the roof truss timbers showed that they date to circa 1743.

The church was primarily part of Martin's Brandon Parish as both an upper and lower church. It is located on the Old River Road that preceded the present Route 10 connecting Suffolk with Hopewell. The parish affiliation changed as parishes were reorganized during the colonial period. The record is somewhat confusing, and recent dating of 1743 tends to change the parish affiliation of this particular building dramatically:

- 1618: Martin's Brandon Parish was originally a plantation parish that derived its name from nearby Brandon Plantation. It was united with Prince George's Parish at that time.
- 1639-1640: The church's "Great Bible" was published in London
- There is indirect evidence of an active parish and, therefore some kind of church edifice, in 1665 and 1675.
- 1676: Nathaniel Bacon of Henrico and many other outraged settlers met at Merchant's Hope Church where they signed petitions to Governor Sir William Berkeley demanding help against attacks by the Native Americans. Berkeley who was engaged in the fur trade with the Native Americans dismissed their petitions leaving Bacon and 211 volunteers to take matters into their own hands which resulted in Bacon's Rebellion.
- 1655–1688 – 1720: Martin's Brandon Parish was made independent of, absorbed by, and again made independent of Westover Parish, immediately north of the James River.
- 1655-1688: The parish was referred to as Jordan's Parish.
- 1688: Is mentioned as a chapel of ease for Westover Church.
- 1702: Prince George County formed from the portion of Charles City County lying South of the James River.
- 1720: Is mentioned as the upper chapel of Martin's Brandon Parish.
- 1743: Current sanctuary constructed
- 1848: Charles Minnigerode appointed rector
- 1857: Was separated from Martin's Brandon Parish, current communion silver dedicated.
- 1865: Used as a cavalry picket post by Union Soldiers during the Civil War, most interior furnishings destroyed.
- 1870: Restoration with interior furnishings reflecting the late 19th-century Victorian influence completed circa 1869/1870
- 1968: Listed on the Virginia Landmarks Register
- 1969: Listed on the National Register of Historic Places
- 1974: Restoration of the interior to its mid-18th-century appearance completed.
- 1990: Modern parish house constructed

Name The vernacular name Merchant's Hope for the present church is derived from the nearby plantation of the same name. The linking of the church to a sailing bark called Merchant's Hope has no validity. The ship and church derived their names from the plantation.

Architecture

Brickwork

This church is the outstanding example of the brick, rectangular room church in the state of Virginia. It is 60 by 25 feet (18.3 m × 7.6 m) as measured on the inside. In colonial contracts for churches this was referred to as "in the clear." It consists of 22 1/2-inch-thick (570 mm) walls of solid brick two-and-a-half bricks thick with English bond below the water table five bricks high and Flemish bond above the water table. The transition from the water table to the walls contains a row of beveled bricks. Glazed headers are used throughout the building, and there is a row of glazed headers along the barge boards. Unlike most churches of the early eighteenth century, there is almost no serious reconstruction in the walls. Rubbed brick including queen closers are present in the doorways, the window trim, and at all four corners of the building.

Doors

The main entrance's pediment (west entrance) is of the most simple character; it consists of a compass heading with simple wood panels on the doors which may be of colonial manufacture. The brickwork surrounding the door is an understated pediment with no pilasters, pillars embedded in a wall. Its only decoration consists of rubbed brick accentuated by queen closers and an arch of flat bricks. The door itself is embellished by a wooden lunette, here a half-circle, and its two, center-opening doors have a small horizontal panel over two large vertical panels. The door's wooden trim contains curved cyma reversa, a reversed S-shaped molding, pieces separating three panes. Wooden pegs are used in both the doors and windows. H-L hinges are used throughout the building.

The south door is identical in detail with the exception that it is a shorter, rectangular opening in the chancel end of the church with a flat arch at the top. Upton comments that "the doorways were comparable in size and visual emphasis to the windows, rather than inconspicuous." and that all Virginia brick churches lacking an elaborate pediment have similar doors with a compass head in the west end and a flat head on the south wall.

Windows

Merchant's Hope has the best preserved compass windows of surviving colonial churches and displays the eventual style of chancel windows universal in eighteenth-century Virginia churches. Although they show systematic repairs, they are "very old" and "surely colonial". They consist of identically sized windows on the north, east, and south walls. There are four windows on the north, two in the east, and three on the south. The vestry door is directly opposite the north-eastern window. On the west wall above the door is a small compass window. The brick embellishment is the same as the west doorway with rubbed brick, queen closers, and a curved arch. They have two vertical sections made up of 24 over 16 panes. They are true guillotine windows with no counterweights. The wood work on the windows, like the west doorway, is a reverse S-curve, and the muntins are one inch thick. The bottoms consist of wooden sills with a row of beveled bricks below them in oarlock orientation.

Interior

The interior was gutted during the Civil War when the church was reputedly used as a cavalry picket station by the Union army, although there was no damage to the doors, windows, or gallery. It was reconstructed and now resembles the general room church configuration with the exception that the T-shaped aisle has been altered to an L-shaped one with the top of the L at the west door and the stem at the south. The chancel has a communion rail while the reconstructed pews are similar to those of Vauter's Church, single row box pews with a door on the aisle end. The pulpit is just south-west of the chancel although it was originally near the middle of the south wall. The west gallery still has its original stairway and rail with asymmetrical balusters characteristic of the early eighteenth century. On the east wall is a communion table centered between the windows and tablets of obligatory scripts: from left to right, the Lord's Prayer, the Ten Commandments (Exodus XX), and the Apostles' Creed. Most notably lacking is the display of a cross: no Anglican Virginia church displayed a cross or other iconography during the colonial period.

Floor

The floor reputedly contains original 18" square flagstones or Portland stone. According to rather dubious evidence, there is a crown mark on the underside of the tiles identifying them as having English origin. An architectural problem with the floor is that the present level is too low for the doorways. Either the door openings as well as the doors were larger or the floor was higher. The present structure of a high door step combined with a low floor is most unlikely to be an original construction characteristic.

Roof / Ceiling

The most prominent feature of the exterior roof is the pronounced kick of the eaves, also seen at Blandford, which flattens them, giving the church a distinctive look. Of course, the present asphalt shingle roof is not original. The roof truss construction is of considerable interest since it is the earliest known example of a king-post truss that is bent at the feet to allow a curved ceiling. The present surface is a semi-domed plaster ceiling completely concealing the truss structure. It was common for ceilings to be painted blue with clouds though this in not mentioned in regards to Merchant's Hope.

Symbolism and Structure

This church contains the most pure example of the essential elements of a rectangular room church that include:

- Dimensions of approximately 60' east-west by 25' north-south.
- Lack of a rood screen separating the chancel from the pews.
- Oriented with the chancel facing east.
- Main doorway on the west wall: vestry door on the south east corner.
- Lack of bell tower or south porch.
- Plain exterior
- Display of tablets containing The Lord's Prayer, the Decalogue, and the Apostles' Creed.

In addition, Upton writes extensively on the symbolism embedded in the general features of the building citing particularly the tendency toward pediments and domes:

- "The pedimented doorways used on many churches are part of a continuous tradition running from Rome through early Christian and medieval building to post-Reformation England; they recall the gateway symbolism of Mediterranean and medieval architecture, and it turn refer, largely unconsciously to the triumphal arches of imperial Rome. They signal the transition for the secular world to the exalted world of the Church.".
- "Pedimented doorways thus partook of the vault/dome/canopy tradition in dignifying the approach to the honored place, and in their shape. The pediment . . . conveyed honor in itself.".

He also states that the combination of a compass pediment on the west door and a triangular pediment on the south was characteristic of early eighteenth-century churches in Virginia:

- " . . . every surviving pedimented church before the 1750s uses a segmental pediment for the main (west) door and a triangular pediment over any secondary doorways . . . in doing so, the gateway/canopy was linked to the compass ceiling and the more general principle that curved or compass forms were more dignified than straight or 'square' ones.".

Hence the plaster, domed ceiling that symbolically suggests the transition from the secular to the rarefied spiritual world.

This transition is also accomplished by the symbolic journey a parishioner takes when entering the church; he progresses from the secular world through the arched west doorway, passes the baptismal font symbolic of entry to the church, walks under a representation of the sacred dome to the pews from which he progresses to the east to take the communion meal from a simple table at the chancel rail from which he can see the sacred texts through the clear light from the large east windows.

Another aspect of the physical structure of Virginia's colonial churches was the social status given to seating. One's social status was reflected in the nearness to the chancel, so parishioners of higher rank sat closest to the pulpit and the chancel while those of low status sat near the west wall. Men and women were also separated by seating them on different sides of the aisle.

Conclusion

All things considered this building is the purest surviving example of the Virginia vernacular church of the colonial era. As Rawlings states:

This church is noted for "the utter simplicity of its west doorway, a simplicity that is matched among surviving structures only at Jamestown.".

"Merchant's Hope . . . is without a doubt our most enigmatic church. Because of its excellent state of preservation and the details of its masonry, its exterior, which is so devoid of unnecessary adornment, represents the supremely classical example of ecclesiastical architecture in colonial Virginia.".

== Modern church ==
Merchant's Hope Episcopal Church still has an active congregation and is among the oldest Protestant churches in America. Over the past 350 years worshipers have included many members of the prominent Harrison family of Virginia, the Randolph family of Virginia, the Bland family of Virginia, the Cocke Family of Virginia, and noted agriculturalist Edmund Ruffin and his family. Many of its current parishioners can trace their ancestry back to the First Families of Virginia.

Merchant's Hope Church is a registered Virginia and National Historic Landmark. One of the church's treasures is the "Great Bible". Rebound and not totally complete, it was printed in London in 1639-40. The "Great Bible" is believed to be the Bible with the longest association with one parish in the United States. The silver communion set on display was made in Charleston, South Carolina, and dedicated on the 200th anniversary of the parish in 1857.

Following damage during the American Civil War the church was re-modeled with 19th-century interior furnishings. A century later the sanctuary was again in need of renovation and it was restored to its probable 18th-century appearance. Recreation of the furnishings was patterned after five extant Tidewater area churches, with expert documentation. The initial restoration of the church was completed in the mid-1970s. In 1974 a Tetragrammaton, originally erected as a decorative motif in the old St Mary Abbots church in London, England in 1696, was given to Merchants Hope under the condition that it be restored. This early Judeo-Christian symbol for Jehovah now hangs above the altar, the only one of its kind in North America.

The church has also undergone more recent renovations that have included masonry repairs to stabilize the structure, the installation of a modern heating and air conditioning system, a security system, and the removal of a slate roof added during the initial restoration that had caused cracking and significant sagging of the roof trusses that were also repaired.

A modern parish hall designed by architect James S. Rawlings, a noted authority on Virginia's colonial architecture, and modeled after the half-timbered structures that were common in England and the colonies during the 17th and 18th centuries was constructed in the early 1990s.

== Notable parishioners ==
- Richard Bland
- Elmon T. Gray
- Charles Hardaway Marks
- Edmund Ruffin

== Resources ==
- Brock, Henry I. (1930). Colonial Churches in Virginia. Richmond, Va.: Dale press.
- Meade, William (1995). Old Churches, Ministers, and Families of Virginia. Philadelphia: Genealogical Publishing Co, Inc, 1847.
- Mason, George C. (1945). Colonial Churches of Tidewater Virginia. Richmond, Virginia: Whittet and Shepperson.
- Rawlings, James S. (1963). Virginia's Colonial Churches: An Architectural Guide. Richmond, Virginia: Garrett and Massie.
- Upton, Dell [1986] (1997). Holy Things and Profane: Anglican Parish Churches in Colonial Virginia. New Haven and London: Yale University Press.
