= Ralph Hamor =

British-American colonist and settler

Vice-Admiral Ralph Hamor Junior
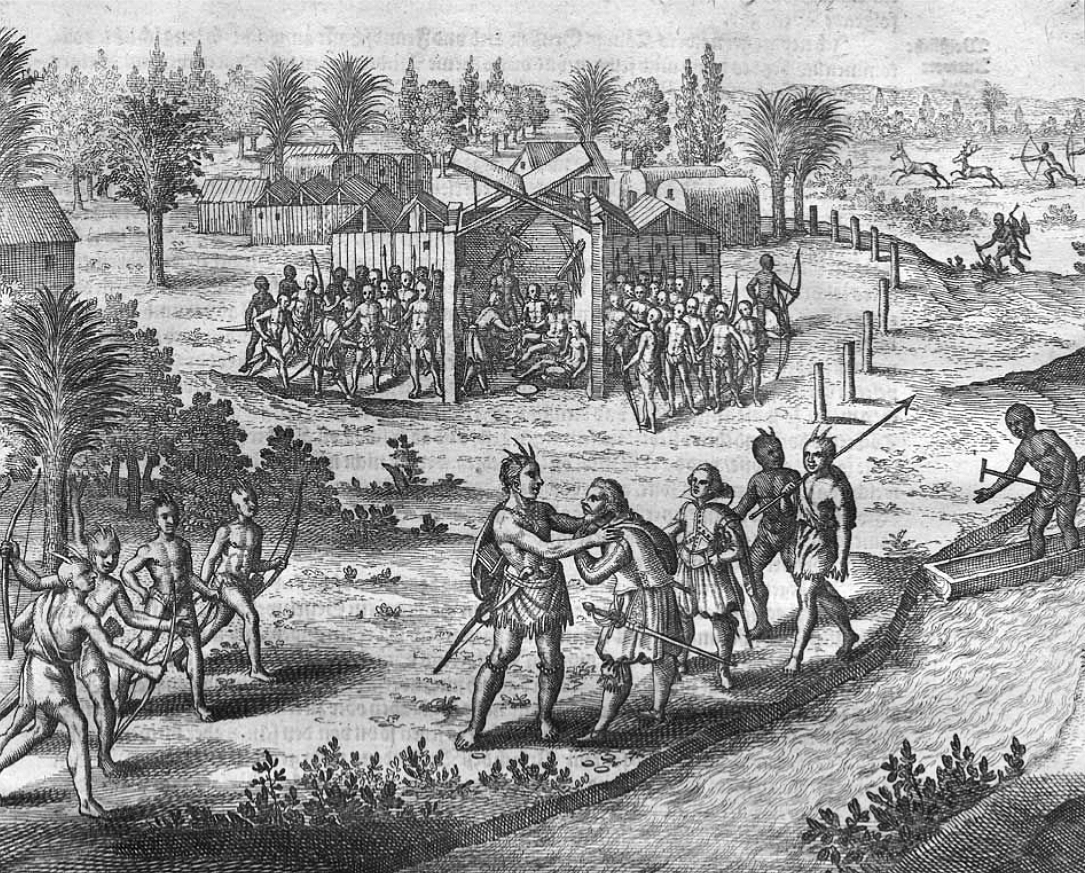
- Ralph Hamor in a meeting with Powhatan
- Born: Raphe Hamor c. 1589; St Nicholas Acons, London
- Died: October, c. 1626; Jamestown Island, Virginia Colony
- Other names: Captain Raphe Hamer, Raph Haman, "Richard" Hamor
- Occupations: Adventurer, sea captain, writer
- Notable work: "A True Discourse of the Present State of Virginia" (1615)
- Spouse: Elizabeth Fuller Clements
- Relatives: Nathaniel Powell (cousin)

Ralph Hamor, Jr. (b. c. 1589 - d. October 1626) was one of the original English colonists to settle in Virginia, and author of A True Discourse of the Present State of Virginia, which he wrote upon returning to London in 1615.

Spellings of his first and last name vary; alternate spellings include "Raph", "Raphe", "Hamer", and "Haman". Later records refer to him as "Ralph", but the man himself used the spelling Raphe Hamor during his life.

== Early life ==
Hamor, Jr. was one of eight children born to Raphe Hamor and Mabell Loveland Hamor and was baptized in the parish of St Nicholas Acons, London on February 16, 1589. It is likely that he was born in this parish. As his father was a wealthy merchant tailor, Hamor had an excellent education and was able to attend Brasenose College, Oxford and a student with his name is listed as admitted to Emmanuel College, Cambridge.

== Career ==
In 1609, Hamor and his father, both members of the London Company, joined the Second Charter of Virginia to sail to the New World as part of the large investment in settling a new colony in Virginia. Funded by the earls of Salisbury, Suffolk, Southampton, Pembroke, and others, a third fleet of nine ships set sail in May, 1609, with 500 people aboard for what would be known as Jamestown. The fleet, led by the admiral ship Sea-Venture and commanded by the three commissions of Captain Christopher Newport, Sir Thomas Gates, and Sir George Somers, set sail for Jamestown. But, as the fleet passed Bermuda on July 25, the tail end of a hurricane caught the flagship, which carried 150 passengers, stranding it on the island and sinking one of the other smaller vessels. Hamor's ship, along with the other six ships commanded by Captains Ratcliffe, Martin, Wood, Webbe, Moon, King and Davies arrived in Virginia safely.

In the fall of 1609, Hamor returned to London, returning to Virginia the following spring. On April 9, 1610, Hamor escorted Lord Delaware and about 100 new settlers, including "Frenchmen to plant vines, and Swiss to find mines" aboard De La Warr, Blessing of Plymouth and Hercules of Rye, back to Virginia. The three supply mission vessels arrived safely in Jamestown on Sunday, June 20, 1610.

On June 22, 1610, Hamor was named Secretary of the Colony by Lord Delaware, and served from 1611 to 1614. In 1611, Hamor and Thomas Savage visited the Native American village of Matchcot, to sit with Powhatan, father of Pocahontas. Hamor forgot to wear the pearl necklace to signify his status as a representative of his government, but told the chief that Sir Thomas Dale wanted to marry one of his daughters.

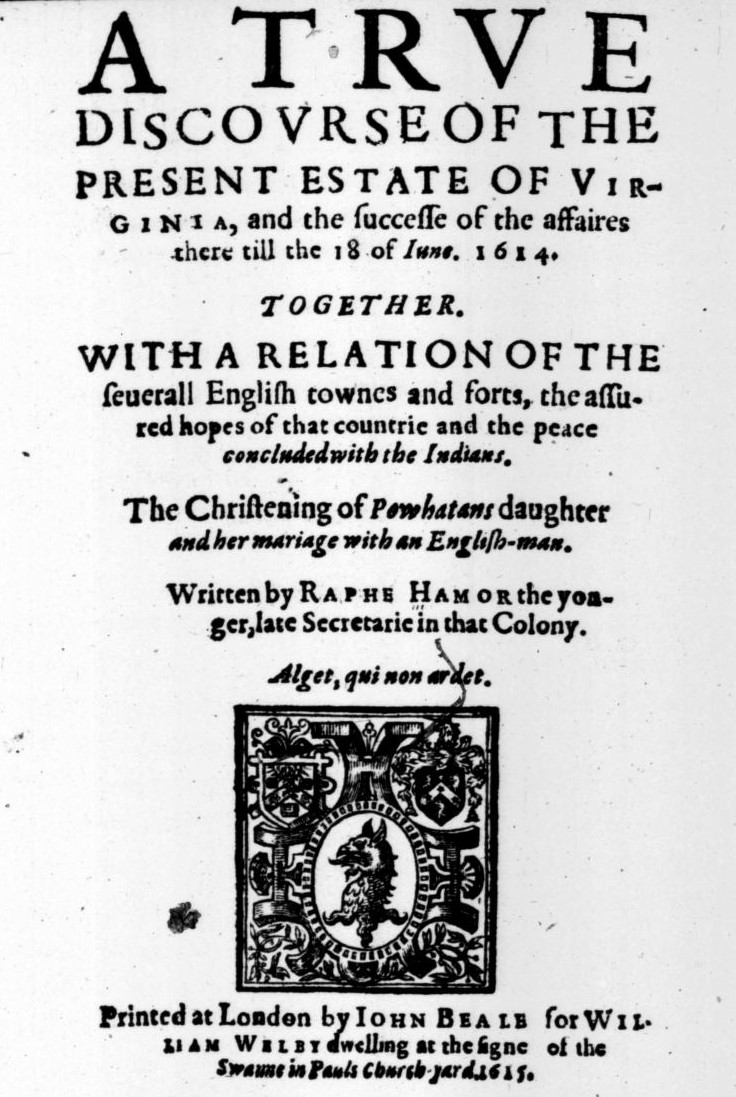
A true discourse of the present estate of Virginia (1615)

In 1615, he returned to London to publish Virginia-based stories in the A True Discourse of the Present State of Virginia. In his tales, he talks about Pocahontas as the most beloved child of her father, his "delight and darling,". He returned to Virginia on November 28, 1616, and was named Vice-Admiral to Admiral Samuel Argall. On January 18, 1617, Hamor was awarded eight shares of the London Company and was put in charge of 16 men.

By summer of 1621, some local Indian tribes became increasingly hostile towards the colonists. Hamor wrote in a letter to the council after the attack on the Flowerieu Hundred plantation: "So sudden in their cruel execution, that few or none discerned the weapon or blow that brought them to destruction."That evening, Captain Hamor took his ship and a Pinnace to attempt to collect the wounded from the different plantations." On June 27, Hamor reached an agreement with the King of the Potomac Indians against the Opechancanough and Necochincos tribes, "Their and our enemy."

As a council member, Hamor was granted land from the Virginia Company in June 1621, upon which he began to establish his own plantation. On November 28, 1621, the new governor, Sir Francis Wyatt, appointed Hamor to the King's Council. One of Hamor's official duties as council member was to insure that Lady Cecily Delaware was satisfied with the cultivation of her assigned Virginian land.

In February, 1622, Hamor returned from England to Virginia in command of Seaflower with 120 new settlers, which included two servants of Hamor's--Thomas Powell and Elkinton Ratliffe—both to work on Hog Island.

== Indian attack of 1622 ==
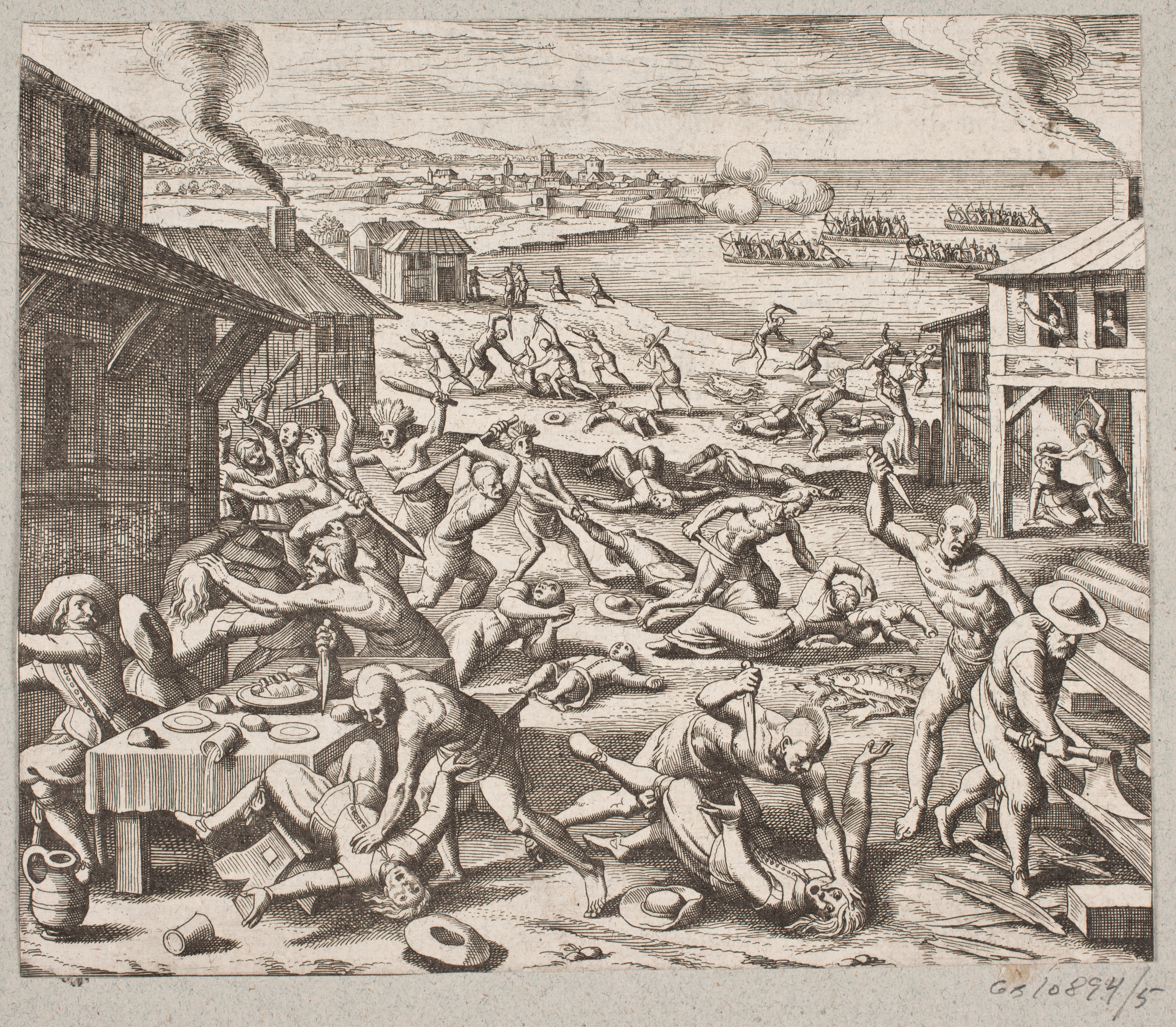
Indian massacre of 1622, depicted as a woodcut by Matthaeus Merian, 1628.

On Friday, March 22, 1622, Hamor, his older brother Thomas, and six of their male servants were attacked by the Indians as the colonists were building Hamor's new house in Warrosquyoake Shire. The colonists drove off their attackers by using bricks, spades, and anything else they could get their hands on. Of the roughly 1,200 Jamestown residents, 347 were killed that day. Thomas was wounded with an arrow to the back during the attack, and his cousin Nathaniel Powell was killed. After the attack, Hamor was ordered to escort the surviving Warrosquyoake Shire settlers to the safety of Jamestown Island, then to stand as command of the Martin's Hundred settlers who were also brought up to Jamestown. Once things settled down, Hamor found himself in a land dispute with one of the biggest plantation owners in Virginia, Edward Bennett. In the summer of 1622, Hamor embarked on a few trade expeditions, as well as a few retaliatory raids against the Native Americans.

By the summer of 1622, the colony was struggling with maintaining adequate food supplies, so the Council ordered several ships to travel far up the Chesapeake Bay to trade with other tribes for food, and if diplomacy failed, use force. Captain Eden commanded Furtherance while Hamor commanded Tiger up the bay. These efforts brought back 4,000 pounds (1,800 kg) of critically needed corn.

Abigail arrived in December, loaded with armor and gunpowder rather than the expected and very necessary food supplies. This ship also was loaded with sick passengers, all of whom were allowed to come ashore. By the spring of 1623, another 500 colonists died from illness, malnutrition, and more sporadic Indian attacks.

== Later years ==
At some point in the early 1620s, Hamor married Elizabeth Fuller Clements, with whom he had no recorded children.

On June 11, 1623, brother Thomas Hamor, died of a burning fever, as reported by surgeon Samuel Mole; Hamor inherited the rights to Thomas' land. In that same year, Hamor married Elizabeth Fuller, born in 1579. Elizabeth was the widow of Jeffrey Clements. Elizabeth had seven children from her previous marriage, born between 1601 and 1609 in Clarkenwell, England. In October of that same year, Hamor gave a formal update to the Virginia Company of the condition of the Colony.

During the spring of 1624, Hamor became involved in another land dispute, this time with Ralph Evers, over cleared land on Hog Island. Evers was eventually allowed the rights to the land, and Hamor was given 200 acres along with funds compensating him for the building he erected on the property given to Evers.

On August 14, 1624, Hamor acquired a home on a 1.5-acre lot. He resided there with his wife, Elizabeth, and two of her children, Jeremiah II and Elizabeth Clements. According to the 1624 Census of Hog Island, Hamor had a total of seven servants. Six of those servants, Jeoffrey Hull, Mordecay Knight, Thomas Doleman, Elkinton Ratcliffe, Thomas Powell, and John Davies, lived with them.

By 1625, Hamor had acquired 250 acres on Hog Island, and another 500 acres at Blue Point, while remaining involved in legal matters of the Jamestown colony, including land disputes, public blasphemy hearings, illegal alcohol sales, even the authorization of the arrest of the town's gunsmith John Jefferson, who eloped with his maidservant.

Hamor died around October 11, 1626. Soon after his death, in early February of 1627, Elizabeth remarried Captain Tobias Felgate. Two years later, Elizebeth died while in England.
