= Richard Pace (planter) =

English colonist of Jamestown, Virginia

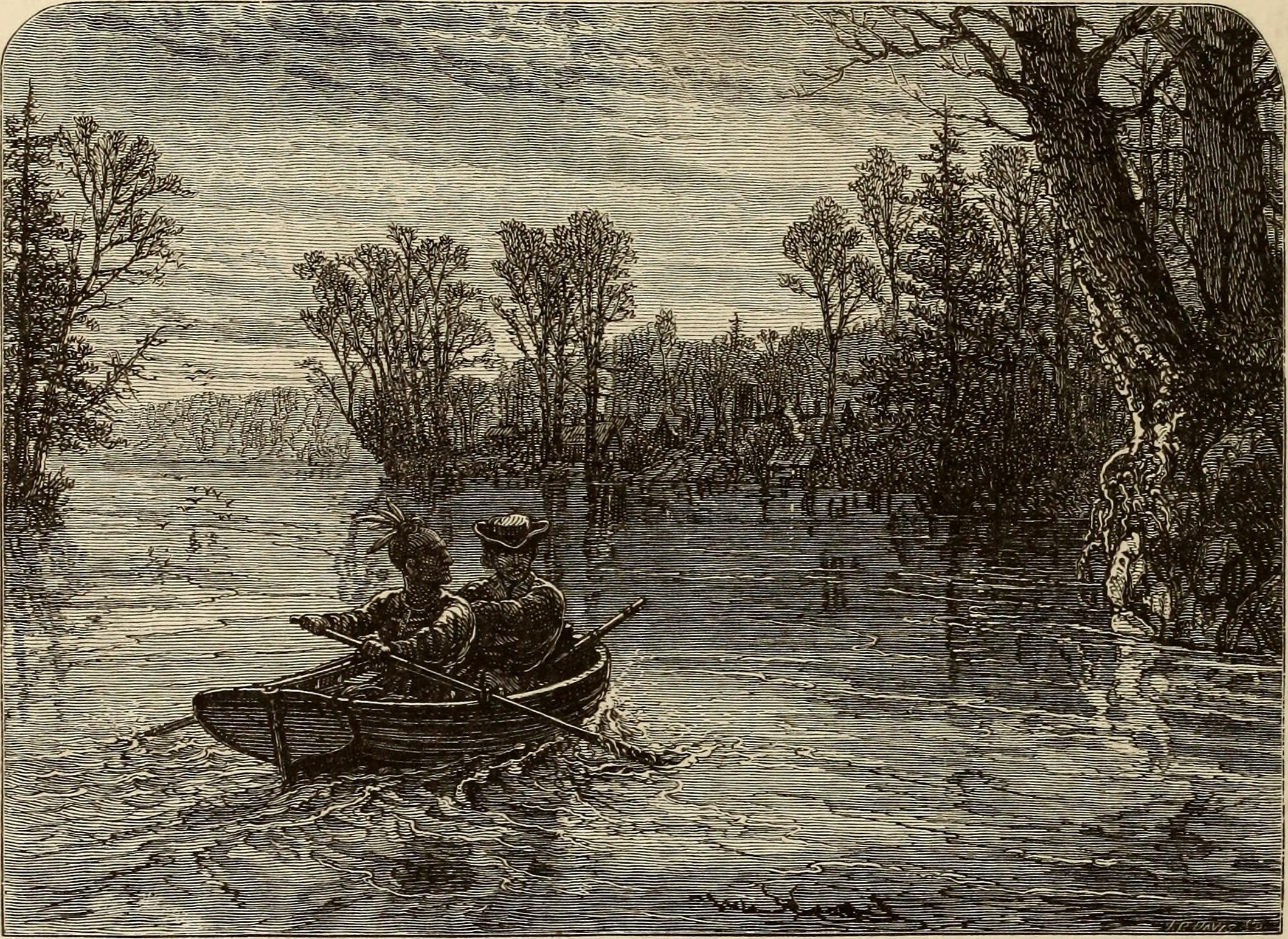
- Illustration of Pace and a native taking warning to Jamestown
- Born: May 24, 1583; Wapping, Middlesex, England
- Died: September 17, 1627 (aged 44); Jamestown, Virginia Colony
- Occupations: Carpenter, farmer
- Known for: Warning Jamestown of a native attack in 1622, Pace's Paines plantation
- Spouse: Isabella Smythe (m. 1608)
- Children: George Pace

Richard Pace was an early settler and ancient planter in colonial Jamestown, Virginia. According to a 1622 account published by the London Company, Pace played a key role in warning the Jamestown colony of an impending Powhatan raid on the settlement.

Richard and Isabella Pace were from Stepney Parish in London. They married in St. Dunstan's Parish Church in October 1608: "Richard Pace of Wapping Wall Carpenter and Isabell Smyth of the same marryed the 5th day October 1608." St Dunstan's has historic links with the sea and with seafarers, and was until recently the "Church of the High Seas", where births, deaths, and marriages at sea were registered. In the 17th century, when Richard Pace and Isabell Smyth married there, the parish included Wapping, a waterfront area occupied by mariners, boatbuilders, merchants, victuallers, and others concerned with London's burgeoning maritime ventures. These associations, taken together with the names, make it plausible that the couple who married in Stepney subsequently voyaged to Virginia and were in fact the same persons as Richard and Isabella Pace of Jamestown. However, no proof of this has emerged.

== Pace's Paines ==
Under Jamestown's colonial charter, Richard and Isabella Pace were designated "ancient planters" and each received a land grant of 100 acres under the headright system established in 1618. Although Richard Pace's original patent has not survived, two later patents give details of the location and date.

Pace died by 1625, and his wife Isabella remarried William Perry. Perry thus became stepfather to Richard Pace's adolescent son George. Three years later, in 1628, George Pace claimed the land and headrights he had inherited from his father:

GEORGE PACE, son and heir apparent to Richard Pace deceased and to his heirs etc as his first dividend 400 acres in the Corporation of James City, on the south side of the river at the plantation called Pace's Paines, and formerly granted to his deceased father, Richard Pace, December 5th, 1620; abutting westerly on the lands of his mother, Isabella Perry, and easterly on the lands of Francis Chapman, now in the possession of William Perry, gent., his father-in-law; and northerly on the main river. Granted by Francis West, September 1st, 1628.

The patent record shows that of these 400 acres, 100 were due "for the personal adventure of Richard Pace", and the other 300 for the importation of six persons – each of these being worth a headright of 50 acres. The six are named in the patent as Lewis Bayly, Richard Irnest, John Skinner, Bennett Bulle, Roger Macher, and Ann Mason.

In the same month, Richard Pace's widow (now Isabella Perry) repatented the remainder of the original Pace grant—the 100 acres that had been granted "for her own personal adventure"—thus putting the land in her own name. At the same time, she also patented 100 acres which had originally been granted to Francis Chapman (another "ancient planter") and which Isabella had apparently acquired by purchase:

ISABELLA PERRY, wife of William Perry, gent., (as her first dividend), 200 acres in the Corporation of James City on the south side of the main river, formerly granted to her and late husband Richard Pace, deceased, December 5, 1620. Said land adjoined westerly that of John Burrowes, now in the tenure of John Smith, and thence extending east to the land granted George Pace, "bearing date with these presents" - 100 acres due for her own personal adventure as an ancient planter, and the other 100 as the dividend of Francis Chapman (granted him December 5, 1620), and by him made over to Richard Richards and Richard Dolphenby, and by them made over to the said Isabella Perry, at a court at James City, January 20, 1621. Granted by Francis West, September 20, 1628.

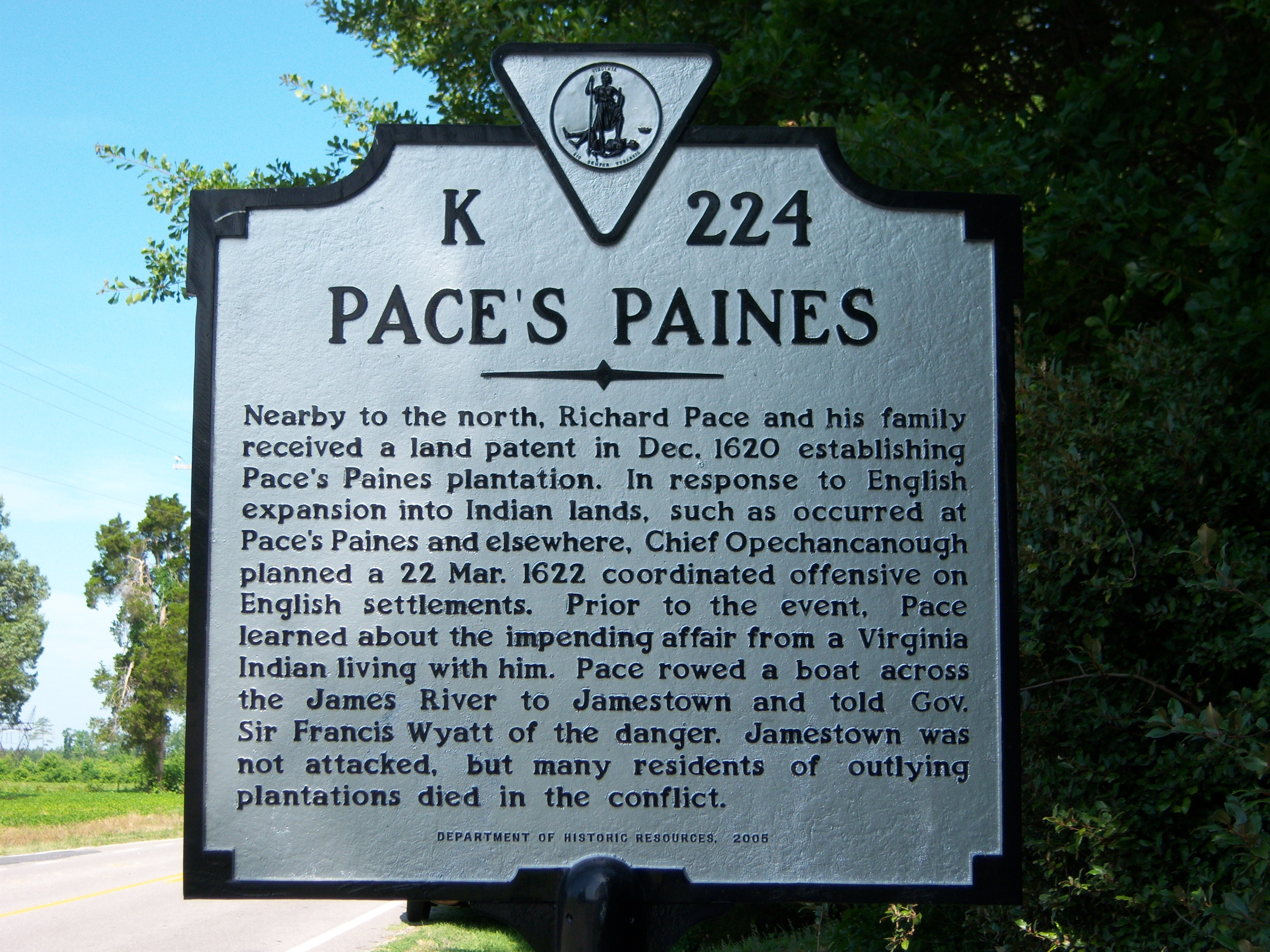
Historical marker in Surry County, Virginia, near the location of the Pace's Paines plantation

Quitrent of one shilling per 50 acres is specified in both these patents. Since ancient planters who had paid their own passage were to receive the land free of quitrent, this shows that Richard and Isabella Pace did not pay their own passage but were brought at the London Company's expense, probably as Company employees.

Having acquired their land, Richard and Isabella Pace made a return trip to England, apparently to find and bring back with them servants to help with the clearing and cultivation. They returned on the Marmaduke in August 1621, bringing with them the six persons later named as headrights in George Pace's 1628 patent (above). They brought with them also a young woman named Ursula Clawson, described as "kinswoeman to Richard Pace an olde Planter in Virginia whoe hath given his bonde to pay for her passadge and other Chardges". Among the other passengers on this sailing of the Marmaduke were a dozen women sent by the Virginia Company "for wiues for the people in Virginia." Ursula Clawson was included in this group, but it appears she was not obliged to take her chances in the marriage auction since her passage was to be paid by Richard Pace. A copy of the bill for her passage was sent to Virginia on the same sailing, and is mentioned in the accompanying letter from the Virginia Company to the Council:

The tobacco that shalbe due vppon the mariadge of these maides we desire Mr Pountis to receiue and to return by the first; as also the little quantitie of Richard Pace the Copie of whose bill is here returned.

There appear to be no further records mentioning Ursula Clawson. Of the six Marmaduke passengers who were later named as headrights in George Pace's 1628 patent, only John Skinner appears again: he is listed in the 1624/5 Muster, still at Pace's Paines, where he is described as a servant in the muster of Phettiplace Close.

In recent years, archeological excavations have been carried out at the location of the Pace's Paines plantation in an effort to learn more about early colonial life. A state historical marker near the site recounts some of the history of Pace's Paines.

== Warning Jamestown ==
In April 1622, in the aftermath of the 1622 Powhatan attack on Jamestown, the Council in Virginia wrote to the London Company giving news of the disaster. That letter gives few details of the attack and does not mention warnings, though it does say that the Indians had attempted "to haue Swept vs away at once through owte the whole lande, had it nott plesed god of his abundant mercy to prevent them in many places."

George Sandys, Treasurer in Virginia, also wrote a letter to England about the attack and its consequences and evidently went into much more detail.

Sandys's letter was apparently the original source of the story of the Indian who warned Richard Pace. According to the story, a Powhatan youth living in the household of Richard Pace had been instructed to kill Pace and his family in conjunction with a planned attack on the colony. The youth instead warned Pace of the impending attack. After securing his household, Pace rowed across the James River to warn James City.

Though directed to the London Company, Sandys's account of the massacre seems to have been widely read and gossiped about in England, perhaps due to the efforts of professional correspondents such as Nathaniel Butter, John Pory (a former Secretary of the Virginia Colony), and the Rev. Joseph Mead—all of whom knew and corresponded with each other and with a wide range of newsworthy persons. A letter received by Joseph Mead in July 1622 refers to the massacre, and mentions "an Indian boy" warning a colonist:

Unsigned letter to Joseph Mead, London July 12, 1622. "I had almost forgott, That all our people in Virginia in all places should on March 22 at 8 in the morning, under pretence of freindship have bin murthered by the Natives; & had bin, had not an Indian boy the night before discovered it to his Master, who all night sent about to give notice. Yet in Martins Hundred too farre of to have notice, almost all were slayne, as namely 329.

=== The London Company's Account ===
In August 1622, the London Company published their official response to the news of the massacre, in the form of a pamphlet compiled by Edward Waterhouse, Secretary to the London Company. This pamphlet, entitled "A declaration of the state of the colony and affaires in Virginia : With a relation of the barbarous massacre in the time of peace and league, treacherously executed by the natiue infidels vpon the English, the 22 of March last" was essentially a damage-limitation exercise by the London Company, trying to reassure disgruntled shareholders and potential emigrants and restore the reputation of Virginia as a place where reasonable persons might hope to make their fortune. Significantly, Waterhouse's pamphlet announces a change of policy towards the Indians:

... our hands which before were tied with gentlenesse and faire usage, are now set at liberty by the treacherous violence of the Savages ... so that we, who hitherto have had possession of no more ground then their waste, and our purchase ... may now by right of Warre, and law of Nations, invade the Country, and destroy them who sought to destroy us. ... Now their cleared grounds in all their villages (which are situate in the fruitfullest places of the land) shall be inhabited by us.

Waterhouse presents the colonists' efforts to convert the Indians to Christianity as evidence of the "gentlenesse and faire usage" with which the Indians had (according to Waterhouse) previously been treated. He goes on to say that "it pleased God to vse some of them as instruments to saue many of their liues, whose soules they had formerly saued, as at Iames-Cittie, and other places, and the Pinnace trading in Pamounkey Riuer, all whose liues were saued by a conuerted Indian, disclosing the plot in an instant."

Waterhouse then cites the letters from George Sandys:

The letters of Mr. George Sandis a worthy Gentleman and Treasurer ... [in the Colony] have advertised ... [how] those treacherous Natiues, after fiue yeares peace, by a generall combination in one day plotted to subvert their whole Colony, and at one instant of time, though our seuerall Plantations were an hundred and forty miles vp one Riuer on both sides ....

They [the Sandys letters] certify further:

That the slaughter had beene vniuersall, if God had not put it into the heart of an Indian belonging to one Perry, to disclose it, who liuing in the house of one Pace, was vrged by another Indian his Brother (who came the night before and lay with him) to kill Pace, (so commanded by their King as he declared) as hee would kill Perry: telling further that by such an houre in the morning a number would come from diuers places to finish the Execution, who failed not at the time: Perries Indian rose out of his bed and reueales it to Pace, that vsed him as a Sonne: And thus the rest of the Colony that had warning giuen them, by this meanes was saued. Such was (God bee thanked for it) the good fruit of an Infidel conuerted to Christianity; for though three hundred and more of ours died by many of these Pagan Infidels, yet thousands of ours were saued by the means of one of them alone which was made a Christian; Blessed be God for euer, whose mercy endureth for euer; Blessed bee God whose mercy is aboue his iustice, and farre aboue all his workes: who wrought this deliuerance whereby their soules escaped euen as a Bird out of the snare of the Fowler.

Pace vpon this discouery, securing his house, before day rowed ouer the Riuer to James-City (in that place neere three miles in bredth) and gaue notice thereof to the Gouernor, by which meanes they were preuented there, and at such other Plantations as was possible for a timely intelligence to be giuen; for where they saw vs standing vpon our Guard, at the sight of a Peece they all ranne away. In other places that could haue no notice, some Peeces with munition (the vse whereof they know not) were there.

Although the number of the dead, as given in this account, is more or less accurate (the total killed being 347), the reference to "thousands" being saved is hyperbolic, since the population of the colony at the time of the massacre was only about 1,240.

Waterhouse's pamphlet was incorporated into the Records of the Virginia Company of London, now held by the Library of Congress.

It may be significant that George Sandys was located near Richard Pace, and may have been one of the first to whom Pace passed on the warning. A map of settlements and plantations along the James shows the Treasurer's land near Pace's Paines.

=== Later accounts ===
In his General Historie of Virginia Captain John Smith (who was not in Virginia at the time of the massacre) gave a long and detailed account of the events, including not only the story of the Indian who warned Richard Pace, but also accounts of warnings given in other places. However, his account of the warning given to Pace adds nothing to the version published by Waterhouse.

In 1705, Robert Beverley included an account of the Indian's warning to Pace in his history of Virginia. This appears to be based on the account given by John Smith. In 1707, the Dutch publisher Peter Van Der Aa published Scheepstogt Van Anthony Chester, na Virginia gedaan in het jaar 1620, which purports to be an anonymous eyewitness account of a voyage to Jamestown. This work was translated into English in 1901. The two events described in the account are a sea fight and the massacre; the account of the massacre includes the story of the Indian warning Richard Pace. However, it seems that the supposed eyewitness account of the events was in reality taken from John Smith's writings and the Waterhouse pamphlet.

From internal evidence, it is clear that Vander Aa's Chester volume was created from two chapters of Captain John Smith's Generall Historie of Virginia. ... John Smith's chapters, in turn, were paraphrased almost exclusively from two contemporaneous works, A True Relation of a Wonderful Sea Fight, published by Nathaniel Butter in 1621, and A declaration of the state of the Colony in Virginia, ... compiled by Edward Waterhouse from correspondence he received from Virginia.

The account given by George Sandys, and retold by Edward Waterhouse, thus remains the sole source for the story of the Indian youth who warned Richard Pace. However, the reference to the Indian's warning in the letter received by the Rev. Mead, so soon after news of the massacre was first received in London, helps to authenticate it as a genuine historical event.

=== William Stith's History: The First Use of the Name "Chanco" ===
Although the Indian youth who warned Richard Pace was not named in the account given in Waterhouse's pamphlet, he has come down to history as "Chanco". He had been adopted by Richard and Isabella who "lived with" them and they "used him as a sonne." This name seems to have been used first by William Stith, in his History of the first discovery and settlement of Virginia, published in 1740. According to a description of Stith's book on the Library of Congress website, "William Stith compiled this detailed factual history of Virginia by culling material from the Records of the Virginia Company, a manuscript archive that Jefferson later owned and used in his own work." Stith included an account of the warning given to Richard Pace, for the first time naming the Indian as"Chanco":

This Slaughter was a deep and grievous Wound to the yet weak and Infant Colony; but it would have been much more general, and almost universal, if God had not put it into the Heart of a converted Indian, to make a Discovery. This Convert, whose name was Chanco, lived with one Richard Pace, who treated him, as his own Son. The Night before the Massacre, another Indian, his Brother, lay with him; and telling him the King's Command, and that the Execution would be performed the next Day, he urged him to rise and kill Pace, as he intended to do by Perry, his Friend. As soon as his Brother was gone, the Christian Indian rose, and went and revealed the whole matter to Pace; who immediately gave Notice thereof to Captain William Powel, and having secured his own House, rowed off before Day to James-Town, and informed the Governor of it.

Stith appears to have picked up the name "Chanco" from his reading of the Records of the Virginia Company. In a later passage in his book, he uses the name again:

As to the lawful Emperor, Opitchupan, he seems very greatly to have disapproved of the Massacre. For I find him, early the next Year, sending Chanco, Pace's Christian Convert, who discovered the Indian conspiracy, to assure Sir Francis Wyatt, that if he would send ten or twelve men, he would give up the rest of the English prisoners, that were in his Possession...

This passage refers to a letter from the Virginia council to the Virginia Company of London dated April 4, 1623 (which is just a year and a few weeks after the March 22, 1622, attack, as New Years Day fell on March 25 under the Julian Calendar used at the time in England and her colonies):

May it please you to understande, yt since our laste Lre, there cam two Indians. to m[artins] Hunndred who accordinge to order were sent vp to James Cyttie, one of which Called (Chauco) who had lived much amongst the English, and by revealinge yt pl[ot] To divers vppon the day of Massacre, saued theire lives, was sent by the great Kinge, wth a messuage, the effect wherof was this, that blud inough had already been shedd one both sides, that many of his People were starued, by our takinge Away theire Corne and burninge theire howses, & that they desired, they might be suffred to plante at Pomunkie, and theire former Seates, wch yf they might Peaceablely do they would send home our People (beinge aboute twenty) whom they saued alive since the massacre, and would suffer us to plant quietly alsoe in all places, The other (called Comahum) an Actor in the Massacre at Martins Hundred, beinge a great man and not sent by the greate Kinge, Wee putt in Chaines, resolvinge to make such vse of him, as the tyme shall require.

Apparently, Stith read the name as "Chanco", and concluded from the description of the Indian as having "revealed the plot to divers upon the day of Massacre", that he was the same person as the Indian who warned Richard Pace. Whether Stith's identification was correct or not has not been determined. In Pocahontas's People, Helen C. Rountree argues that Chauco and the Pace's Paines Indian have probably been wrongly conflated.

=== Consequences ===
Whatever his name, William Perry's Indian servant may have saved many lives through his warning to Richard Pace. The story was then used by the London Company for purposes of propaganda, as evidence that the Virginia venture was still blessed by God. However, the Company was already in its death throes before the attack took place. The Charter was withdrawn by James I in 1624, and Virginia became a Royal Colony.

== Return to Pace's Paines ==
In the wake of the 1621/22 attack, Richard Pace and his family resided within the protection of Jamestown's walled fortifications. Then, sometime between October 1622 and January 1622/23, he submitted a petition to the Governor and Council in Virginia requesting permission to return to Pace's Paines:

To the right Wor^{11} S^{r} Francis Wyatt knight ec and to the rest of the Counsell of Estate here

The Humble petition of Richard Pace Humbly sheweth Whereas yo^{r} petitioner heretofore hath Enjoyed a Plantation one thother side of y^{e} water, & hath bestowed great Cost & Charges vppon building ther, & Cleareing of ground but at length was Enforced to leaue ye same by y^{e} sauidge Crewelly of y^{e} Indians. Yett now purposeing (by gods assistance) to fortifie & strengthen y^{e} place w^{th} a good Company of able men, hee doth desier to inhabit ther againe, & by yo^{r} leaue freely to Enjoy his said plantation, promissing to Doe all such things as by yo^{r} wo^{r}ps dyrections hee shalled by Enjoyned, either for y^{e} better safe guard & defence of y^{e} people, h^{t} hee shall ther put ou^{r}, or in w^{t}eu^{r} yo^{r} shall please to Comaund him

In tender Consideration Wherof may itt please yo^{r} wo^{r}ps to grant him his request, and hee shalbe bound to pray for yo^{r} health and happines both in this Worlde & in y^{e} worlde to Come

This petition graunted, as many others also resouled vpon ther plantations according to order receaued from England

Richard Pace died before 9 May 1625 when his widow Isabella testified in court as Mrs. Isabella Perry, showing that by that date she had married William Perry. Isabella would also outlive William Perry and marry George Menefie, a merchant in Jamestown, after August 1637.

== Descendants ==
The 1628 land patent quoted above shows that Richard Pace had a son named George Pace. The following Virginia Colonial land abstract of a quitclaim dated 25 February 1658/9, shows that George Pace married Sara Maycocke, whose father, the Rev. Samuel Maycock, was killed in the 1622 attack. The quitclaim also shows that George and Sarah Pace had a son named Richard:

Know all men by these presents, and witnesse that I Richd Pace sonne and heire apparent of mr Geo Pace of the Com of Charles Citty att Mount March in Virginia, and sonn and heire as the first issue by my mother Mrs. Sara Macocke wife unto my aforesd father (being both dec'd) Do hereby by these presents ... allow of the sale of eight or nine hundred acres of land being neere unto Pierces hundred, als Flowrday Hundred, sold by my dec'd. father Mr. George Pace unto Mr. Thomas Drew as per bill of sale bearing date the 12th of October Ao 1650 ...

This second Richard Pace had a wife named Mary, as shown by a Charles City, Virginia, court record dated 13 March 1661/2, in which Richard Pace sells land "with consent of my wife, Mary Pace". He died by 14 February 1677/78, when administration was granted to Mary Pace on the estate of "Richard Pace, her deceased husband". No will survives. On the basis of a family letter (said to have been written in 1791), John Frederick Dorman, editor of Adventurers of Purse and Person, attributes eight children to Richard Pace of Charles City County, and gives information on descendants of three of the sons.

One of Richard Pace's descendants was Hardy Pace, who is the namesake for Pace's Ferry which was an important ferry across the Chattahoochee River near Atlanta.

- Wesley Frank Craven, The Dissolution of the Virginia Company: the failure of a colonial experiment (Oxford University Press, 1930)
- John Frederick Dorman, Adventurers of Purse and Person, Virginia, 1607–1624/5: Families G-P, (Genealogical Pub. Co., 2005)
- Charles E. Hatch, The First Seventeen Years: Virginia 1607–1624 (University of Virginia Press, 1957)
- Helen C. Rountree, Pocahontas's People: the Powhatan Indians of Virginia through four centuries (University of Oklahoma Press, 1996)
