= John Warde (burgess) =

Virginia colonial politician

John Warde (also spelled Ward; c. 1586 – c. 1636) was an English-born early American merchant, fisherman, and politician in Virginia who served as a member in the first House of Burgesses in 1619.

== Biography ==
Warde was born around 1586 in The Abingtons, Cambridgeshire, England.

In April 1619, Warde arrived to Virginia by his ship Sampson, along with fifty settlers (including Reverend Thomas Bargrave) who would form a private 1,200-acre plantation and settlement known as Warde's Creek. Warde worked as a fisherman and operated a mercantile.

Warde served one term in the Virginia House of Burgesses in July and August of 1619. He served on the committee that examined the first and third books of the "Great Charter."

In the 1620s, Warde continue to work as a merchant and traded along the Potomac river.

== Death ==
Warde died by 1636 as referenced in a land grant to his widow.
