= Chanco =

Famous Virginian Native American

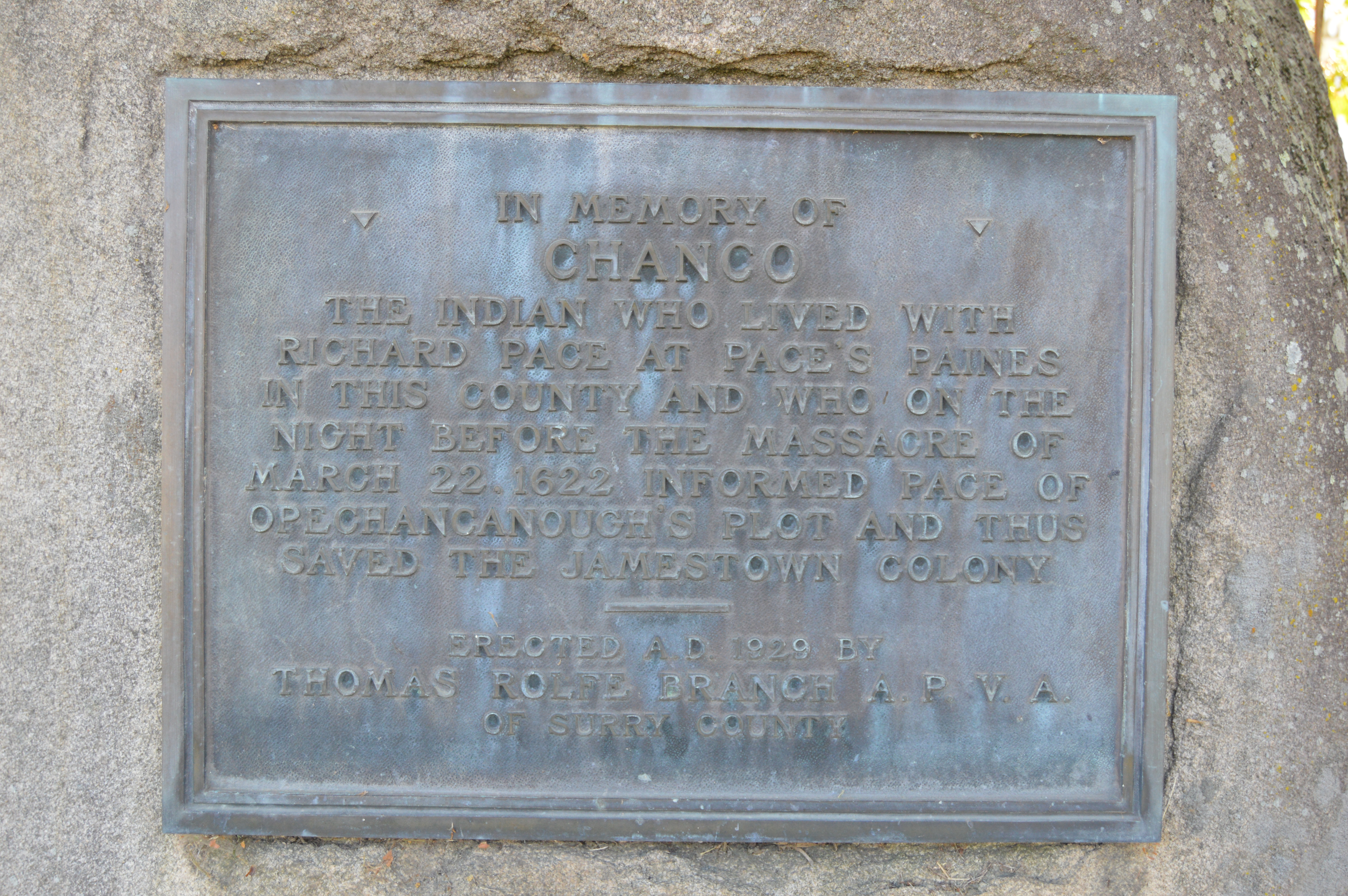
- Memorial to Chanco outside the Surry County Courthouse
- Other names: "Chauco", "Chancho", "Chacrow" (disputed)
- Known for: Warning Richard Pace of a 1622 native attack

Chanco (fl. 1622) is a name traditionally assigned to a Powhatan Indian who was converted to Christianity and apparently adopted by Richard and Isabella Pace, and in 1622 is said to have been alerted by his brother about an impending Powhatan attack (Note: For a discussion of the various accounts of the Indian's warning, and its consequences for Jamestown,) to which he alerted the Jamestown colonists, Richard Pace and his wife, Isabella.

== Unnamed Native ==
The Native American's warning to Richard Pace is described in the Virginia Company of London's official account of the 1622 Powhatan attack on Jamestown, but the Native American is not named. He is described only as a converted Native American "belonging to one Perry:"

That the slaughter had beene vniuersall, if God had not put it into the heart of an Indian belonging to one Perry, to disclose it, who liuing in the house of one Pace, was vrged by another Indian his Brother (who came the night before and lay with him) to kill Pace, (so commanded by their King as he declared) as hee would kill Perry: telling further that by such an houre in the morning a number would come from diuers places to finish the Execution, who failed not at the time: Perries Indian rose out of his bed and reueales it to Pace, that vsed him as a Sonne: And thus the rest of the Colony that had warning giuen them, by this meanes was saued. Such was (God bee thanked for it) the good fruit of an Infidel conuerted to Christianity; for though three hundred and more of ours died by many of these Pagan Infidels, yet thousands of ours were saued by the means of one of them alone which was made a Christian; Blessed be God for euer, whose mercy endureth for euer; Blessed bee God whose mercy is aboue his iustice, and farre aboue all his workes: who wrought this deliuerance whereby their soules escaped euen as a Bird out of the snare of the Fowler.

The account later makes reference to other Native Americans who warned settlers of the impending attack:

...it pleased God to vse some of them as instruments to saue many of their liues, whose soules they had formerly saued, as at Iames-Cittie, and other places, and the Pinnace trading in Pamounkey Riuer, (Note: The pinnace was later identified as that of Capt Raleigh Croshaw.) all whose liues were saued by a conuerted Indian, disclosing the plot in an instant.

All of the Native Americans who gave warnings are unnamed.

== Chauco ==
A Native American named Chauco is mentioned in a letter from the Council in Virginia to the Virginia Company of London, dated April 4, 1623:

May it please you to understande, yt since our laste Lre, there cam two Indians. to m[artins] Hunndred who accordinge to order were sent vp to James Cyttie, one of which (Chauco) who had lived much amongst the English, and by revealinge yt pl[ot] To divers vppon the day of Massacre, saued theire lives, was sent by the great Kinge, wth a messuage, the effect wherof was this, that blud inough had already been shedd one both sides, that many of his People were starued, by our takinge Away theire Corne and burninge theire howses, & that they desired, they might be suffred to plante at Pomunkie, and theire former Seates, wch yf they might Peaceablely do they would send home our People (beinge aboute twenty) whom they saued alive since the massacre, and would suffer us to plant quietly alsoe in all places, The other (called Comahum) an Actor in the Massacre at Martins Hundred, beinge a great man and not sent by the greate Kinge, Wee putt in Chaines, resolvinge to make such vse of him, as the tyme shall require.

== "Chauco" misread as "Chancho" ==
In 1740, William Stith published his History of the first discovery and settlement of Virginia. According to a description of the book on the Library of Congress website, "William Stith compiled this detailed factual history of Virginia by culling material from the Records of the Virginia Company, a manuscript archive that Jefferson later owned and used in his own work." The archive was subsequently acquired by the Library of Congress and is now available online

Stith evidently read the letter in which Chauco's peace mission is mentioned and concluded that Chauco (misread by Stith as "Chanco") was the same person as the Native American who warned Pace. The identification is explicitly made by Stith in the following passage:

"I find... [Opechancanough], early the next Year, sending Chanco, Pace's Christian Convert, who discovered the Indian conspiracy, to assure Sir Francis Wyatt, that if he would send ten or twelve men, he would give up the rest of the English prisoners, that were in his Possession..."

Whether Stith's identification was correct or mistaken remains undetermined. In Pocahontas's People, the historian Helen C. Rountree argues that Chauco and the Pace's Paines Native American have probably been wrongly conflated.

Whatever the truth, the name "Chanco" has by now been firmly established in folklore as the name of "the Native American who saved Jamestown" and seems unlikely ever to be dislodged.

== Appearance in modern culture ==
Chanco on the James (formerly Camp Chanco) is an outdoor events facility and summer camp in Surry County, Virginia, and is owned and operated by the Episcopal Diocese of Southern Virginia.
