= Powell's Creek (James River tributary) =

River in Virginia, United States

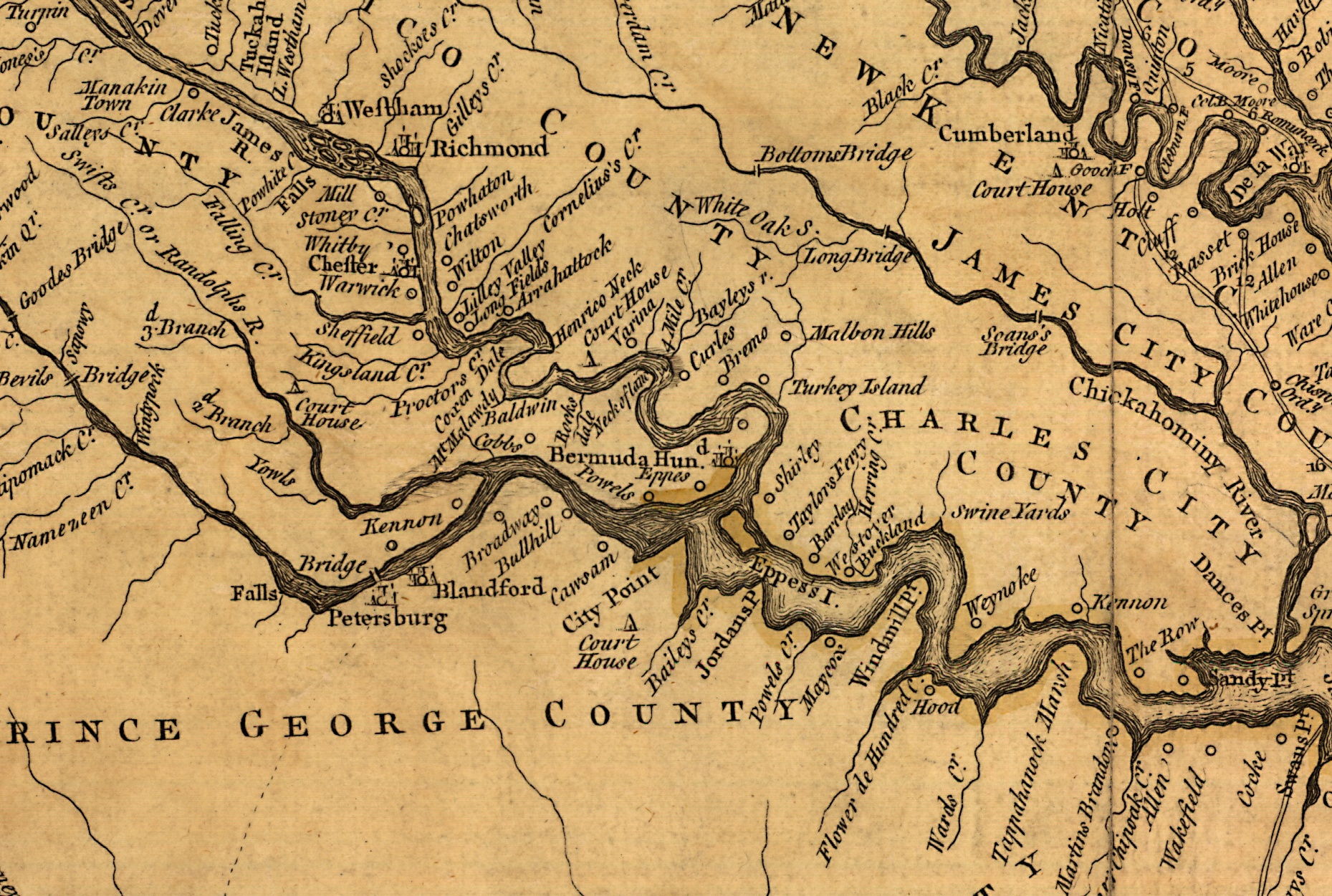
- Powel's Creek shown on the Fry-Jefferson map (1752) between Jordan's Point and the Maycock Plantation (also known as Maycox Plantation).

Physical characteristics
- Mouth
  - location: near Garysville, Virginia
  - coordinates: 37°17′40″N 77°09′38″W

Powell's Creek is a tributary of the James River on the south side of the James River in Prince George County, Virginia, United States. The creek borders James River National Wildlife Refuge near Garysville, Virginia.

== History ==
In 1730, a tobacco inspection site was located here. According to the Tobacco Inspection Act, the inspection was "In Prince George; at Appamatox Point, upon Col. Bolling's land; on Col. Robert Mumford's land; and Powel's Creek; upon Mr. Bland's land, under one inspection."

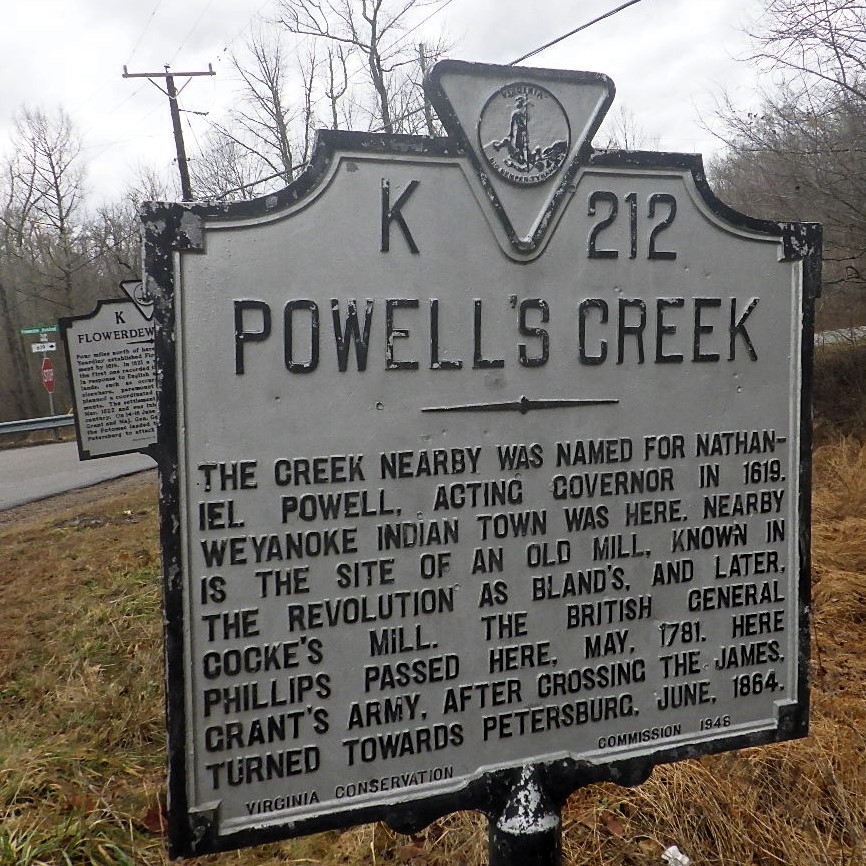
Powell's Creek historical marker

According to a State of Virginia historical marker, "The creek ... was named for Nathaniel Powell, acting governor in 1619. Weyanoke Indian town was here. Nearby was the site of an old mill, known in the Revolution as Bland's, and later, Cocke's Mill. The British General Phillips passed in May 1781. Ulysses S. Grant's army, after crossing the James, turned towards Petersburg, June, 1864."
