= James River National Wildlife Refuge =

United States National Wildlife Refuge in Virginia

- IUCN category IV (habitat/species management area)
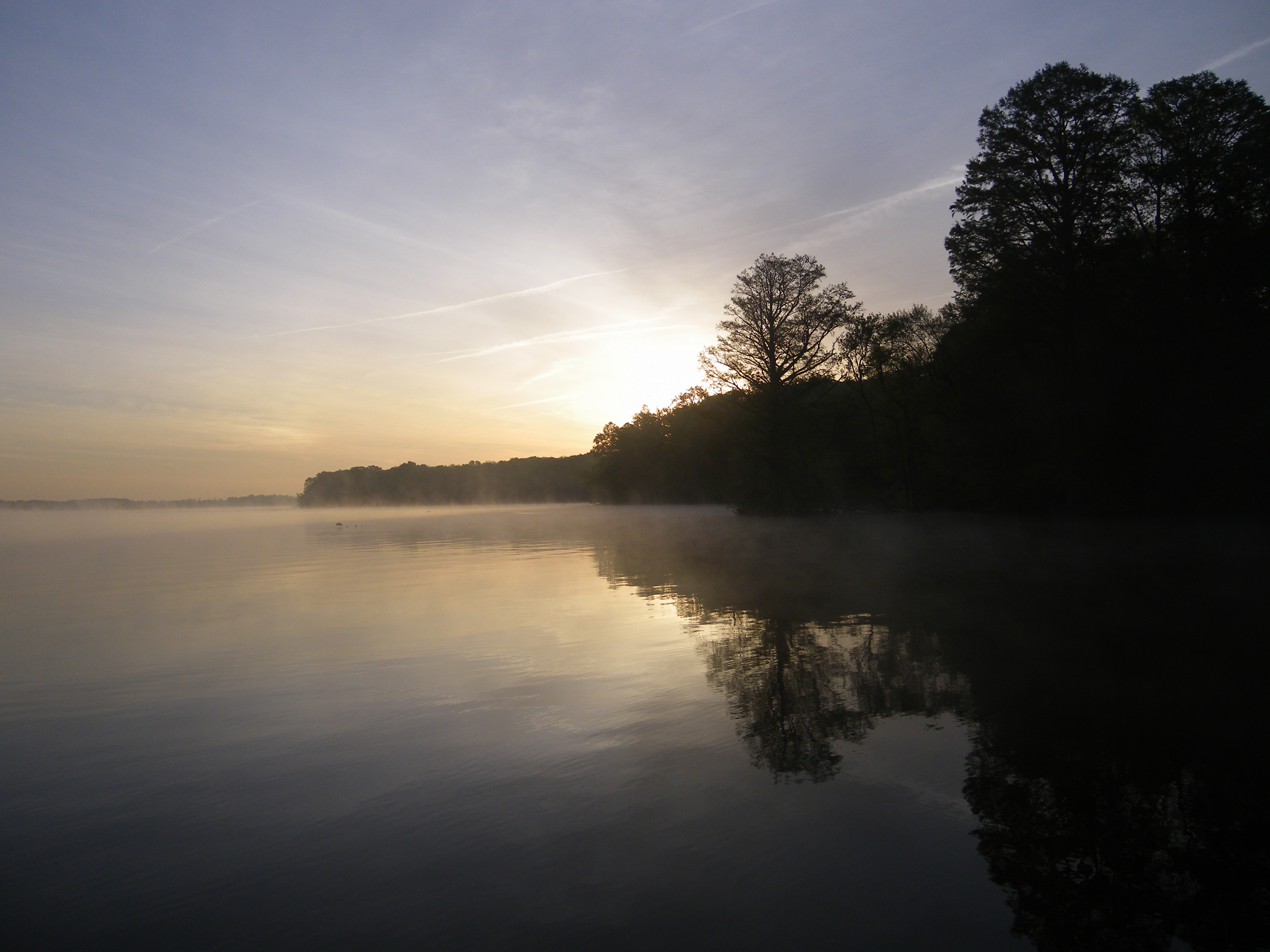

- Location within Virginia Location within the United States
- Location: Prince George County, Virginia, United States
- Nearest city: Hopewell, Virginia
- Coordinates: 37°16′03″N 77°07′45″W
- Area: 4,200 acres (17 km^{2})
- Established: 1991
- Governing body: U.S. Fish and Wildlife Service
- Website: James River National Wildlife Refuge

The James River National Wildlife Refuge is a National Wildlife Refuge located along the James River in eastern Prince George County, Virginia. The United States Fish and Wildlife Service oversees its management.

One of four refuges that comprise the Eastern Virginia Rivers National Wildlife Refuge Complex, James River National Wildlife Refuge was established in 1991 to protect nesting and roosting habitat of the bald eagle from development. The refuge's 4,800 acres (19 km^{2}) of forest and wetlands are bordered by Powell Creek to the west and by Flowerdew A Hundred Plantation to the east.

The land that is now the refuge was the site of Powellbrooke Plantation, whose owner, Captain Nathaniel Powell (one of the original 1607 colonists), his wife, and ten others were killed during the Indian massacre of 1622, and later Merchant's Hope Plantation during colonial times.

== Ecology & Wildlife Management ==
Various research and land management projects are active at James River NWR. Including monitoring bird species like Bald Eagles, monitoring arthropod species like endangered Frosted Elfin, and working to restore longleaf pine savannah, an exceedingly rare habitat in Virginia. Longleaf pine restoration has primarily involved cutting small sections of current loblolly stands, planting longleaf pine and regularly burning the experimental plot to control for longleaf dominance.
