= Hungars Point, Virginia =

Unincorporated community in Virginia, US

Coordinates: 37°25′34″N 75°58′03″W

Hungars Point is an unincorporated community in Northampton County, Virginia, United States.
