= Thomas Bargrave =

Early American minister

The Reverend Thomas Bargrave
- Rector of Henrico Parish
- In office: 1619–1621

Orders
- Ordination: 1614

Personal details
- Born: 1581 Kent, England
- Died: 1621 (aged 39–40) Virginia Colony, U.S.
- Denomination: Anglican
- Occupation: Minister, preacher
- Education: Clare College, Cambridge

Thomas Bargrave (1581–1621) was a colonial American Anglican minister who served as rector of Henrico Parish.

== Early life ==
Bargrave was born around 1581 in Kent, England. He was educated at Clare College, Cambridge, earning a Bachelor of Arts around 1600, Master of Arts in 1603, Bachelor of Divinity in 1610, and Doctor of Divinity in 1621.

== Ministry ==
Bargrave served as vicar of Eythorne, Kent, from 1614 until his departure for Virginia around April 1619 alongside his two brothers, George and John.

By 1619, Bargrave had succeeded previous rectors such as Alexander Whitaker to become rector of Henrico Parish, serving the settlement of Henricus on the James River. He ministered to the colonists and supported religious instruction, including outreach toward local Native Americans.

=== Proposed College at Henrico ===
In 1618, the Virginia Company of London obtained a royal charter (with Bargrave's coordination) to establish a university on 15,000 acres of land set aside at Henricus. Although the institution never materialized, the plan included a college to educate both English colonists and indigenous youth. Bargrave actively supported this effort.

Outside of his ministry, Bargrave also established the first private plantation in Virginia in 1619.

== Death ==
Upon his death in 1621, he bequeathed his personal library, valued at 100 marks (approximately £70), to the projected college at Henrico library. His gift is among the earliest recorded philanthropic contributions to higher education in colonial North America.

=== Legacy ===
Although the Henrico college project was short-lived, Bargrave’s vision prefigured later institutions—particularly the College of William & Mary (chartered in 1693). His bequest marked an early expression of charitable support for higher education in the English colonies.
