= The Generall Historie of Virginia, New-England, and the Summer Isles =

Book written by Captain John Smith

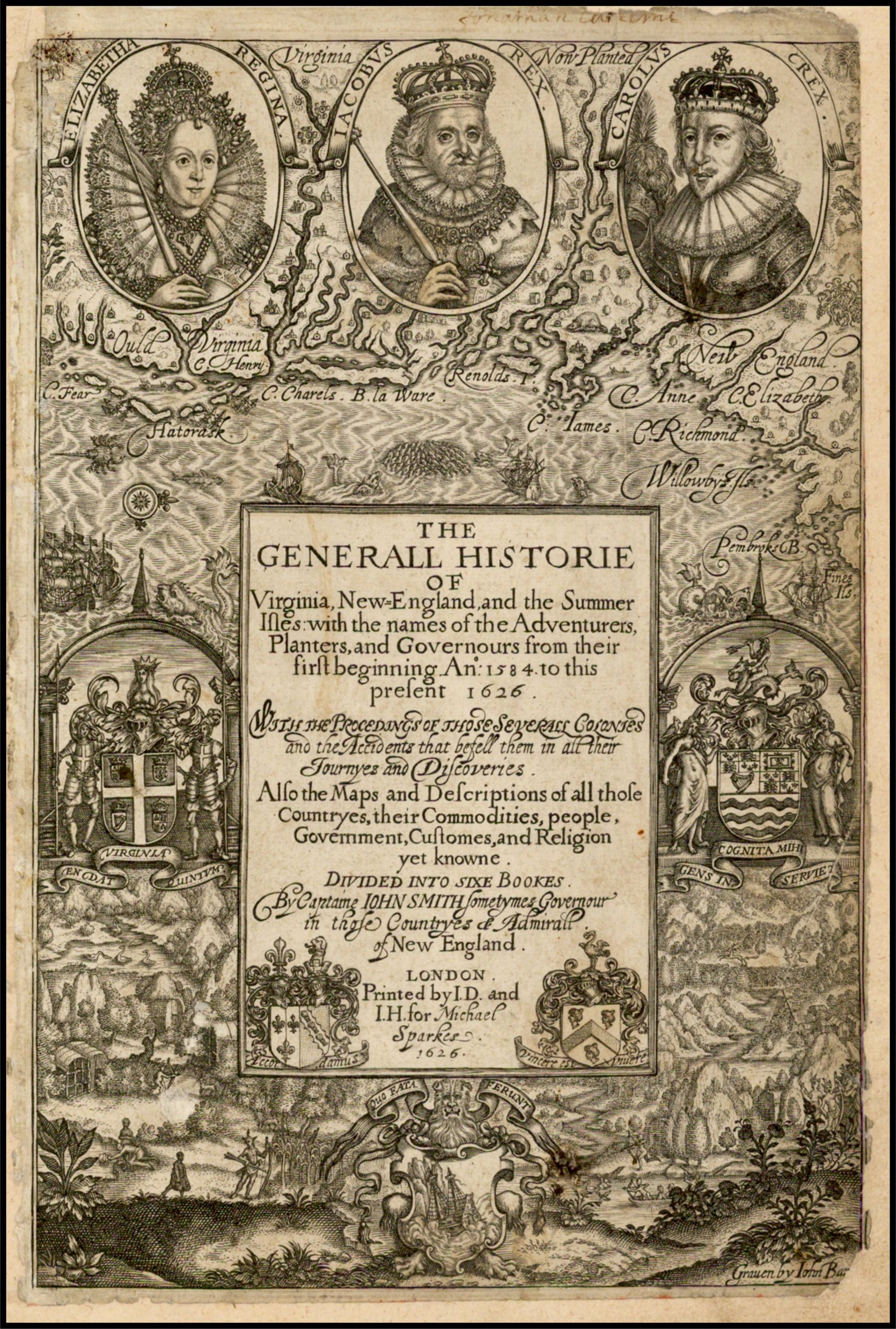
1624 edition of John Smith's History of Bermuda, in concert with Virginia and New England

The Generall Historie of Virginia, New-England, and the Summer Isles (often abbreviated to The Generall Historie) is a book written by Captain John Smith, first published in 1624. The book is one of the earliest, if not the earliest, histories of the territory administered by the London Company.

== Background ==
Originally, two English joint-stock companies had been made to settle North America, then known as the Colony of Virginia. In June 1606, the London Company was granted a charter for a section of the continent south of that given to the Plymouth Company. Both companies established settlements in 1607 - the London Company in Jamestown, and the Plymouth Company in Plymouth. Soon, the term Virginia came to refer only to that part of North America covered by the London Company's original charters. The third charter, of 1612, extended its territory far enough across the Atlantic to include the Somers Isles (Bermuda), which the Virginia Company had been in unofficial possession of since the 1609 wreck of the Sea Venture.

John Smith fell out of favor with the directors of the Virginia Company mostly due to his insistence of increasing food supply and reducing colonist numbers. Despite this, he wrote a series of publications after returning to England in October 1609 about the colonial effort in North America, where he marginalized the Company's involvement. The Generall Historie was based in large part on information he was given by others, as he had not personally witnessed what had happened in the years between his leaving Virginia and publishing the book. Some episodes may have been fabricated, condensed, or truncated, the most famous perhaps being whether or not he was actually "saved" from death by Pocahontas in 1607 (a fact Smith did not write about until this publication).

Further, he had never visited Bermuda, which had been separated from Virginia to be managed by the Somers Isles Company (formed in 1615 by the shareholders of the Virginia Company). His information on Bermuda may have come from the then Governor, Nathaniel Butler, who probably provided the drawing which was the basis of the engraving printed in the Historie, a map, and illustrations of important sites in that

== Writing ==
All 17th-century American writings were essentially in the manner of British writings, and both the content and form of the literature of this first century in America were markedly English. John Smith is credited with initiating American literature, and wrote in the tradition of geographic literature, the book being written to explain colonizing opportunities to Englishmen. His numerous publications also offered practical advice on seamanship and colonization, and his literary achievements were probably more important to England’s imperial aspirations than his travel ones.

== Publication history ==
The Generall Historie was first printed by I.D and I. H. for Michael Sparkes in 1624. Other editions followed in 1625, 1626, 1627, 1629, 1631, and 1632.
