= Cornish House =

Cornish House may refer to:

- Cornish House (Little Rock, Arkansas), listed on the NRHP in Arkansas
- Cornish House (Bowdoinham, Maine), listed on the NRHP in Maine
- Joel N. Cornish House, Omaha, NE, listed on the NRHP in Nebraska
