= McCobb (surname) =

McCobb is a surname. Notable people with the surname include:

- Dave McCobb, British politician
- Paul McCobb (1917–1969), American furniture designer

== See also ==
- McCobb–Hill–Minott House, a historic house in Phippsburg, Maine, United States
