= Percy District School House =

- Percy District School House, (Former)
- U.S. National Register of Historic Places
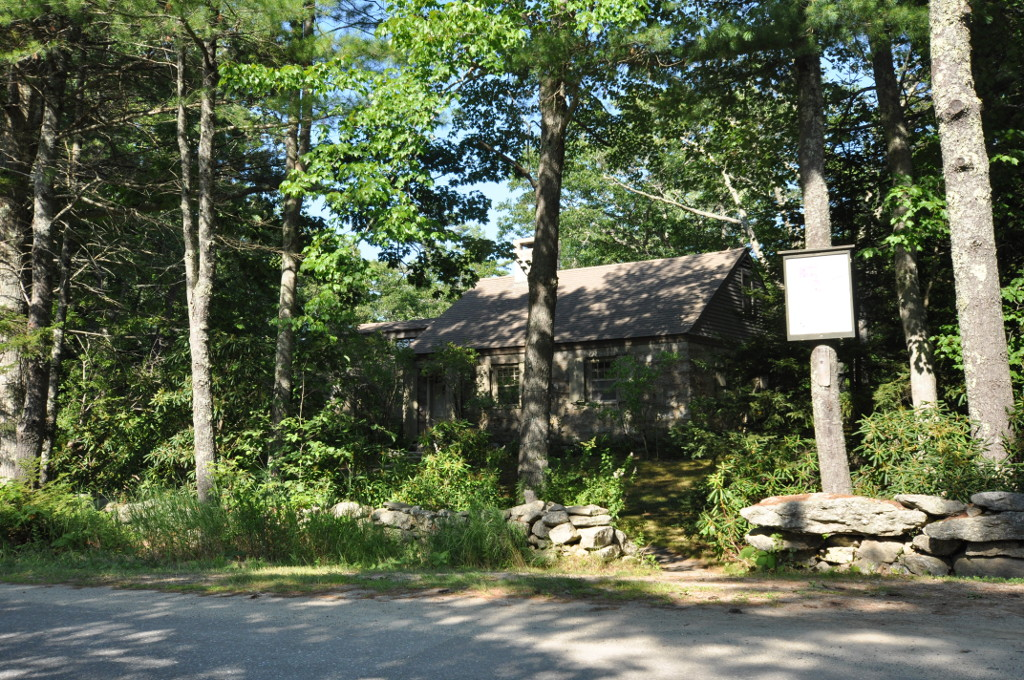

- Location within Maine Location within the United States
- Location: Junction of Parker Head and Cox Head Rds., Phippsburg, Maine
- Coordinates: 43°46′4″N 69°48′6″W
- Area: less than one acre
- Built: 1838
- Architectural style: Mid 19th Century Revival
- NRHP reference No.: 99000377
- Added to NRHP: March 25, 1999

The Percy District School House is a former district school at the junction of Parker Head and Cox Head Roads in Phippsburg, Maine. Now adapted for use as a private residence, this 1830s school house is one of a small number of 19th-century district schools in the state to be built out of granite blocks. It was listed on the National Register of Historic Places in 1999.

== Description and history ==
The former Percy District School House stands on the east side of the junction of Parker Head and Cox Head Roads, in a rural part of the middle third of Phippsburg. It is a single-story structure, built out of quarry faced granite blocks and covered by a gable roof. Its main facade faces west, with the entrance at the northwest corner and two sash windows in rectangular openings. The southern gable end has a pair of sash windows. The windows are all 20th-century replacements, designed to reproduce the building's original windows. A modern single-story wood-frame ell, also with a gable roof, is attached at one corner of the building.

The school was built in the mid-1830s, and is one of three surviving 19th-century stone school buildings in the region, and one of three district schools surviving in the town. This one bears some resemblance to the c. 1820 Stone Schoolhouse in Georgetown. It was built in mid-1830s, and used as a school until 1926. Phippsburg closed all of its district schools in 1958. After standing vacant, a project was begun in 1944 to adapt the building for residential use.

== See also ==
- National Register of Historic Places listings in Sagadahoc County, Maine
