= Georgetown Historical Society =

Georgetown Historical Society may refer to organizations in:

- Georgetown, Delaware, including the Delaware Confederate Monument
- Georgetown, Maine, based in the Stone Schoolhouse
- Georgetown, Massachusetts, based in the Brocklebank–Nelson–Beecher House
