= Captain Merritt House =

Historic house in Maine, United States

- U.S. National Register of Historic Places
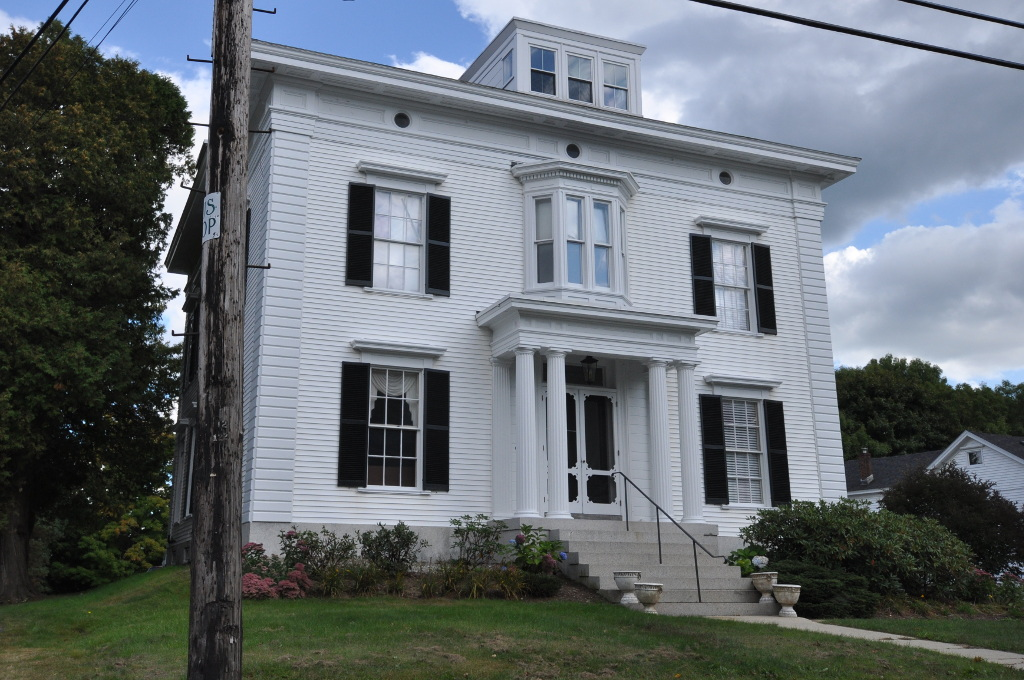

- Location within Maine Location within the United States
- Location: 619 High St., Bath, Maine
- Coordinates: 43°54′25″N 69°49′12.5″W
- Area: 0.5 acres (0.20 ha)
- Built: 1851
- Architectural style: Italianate
- NRHP reference No.: 85000243
- Added to NRHP: February 8, 1985

The Captain Merritt House is a historic house at 619 High Street in Bath, Maine. Built in 1851 for a ship's captain, its lavish Italianate styling epitomizes the wealth that came to the city in the mid-19th century. The house was listed on the National Register of Historic Places in 1985.

== Description and history ==
The Captain Merritt House is located on the east side of High Street, which runs on the hill above the city's shipyards, and was in the 19th century a fashionable residential area. The house is a two-story wood-frame structure, with a shallow-pitch hip roof and shiplap siding. The building corners are quoined, and the roof is pierced by hip-roof dormers. The main entrance is set at the center of the west-facing front facade, sheltered by a portico supported by paired Doric columns. A polygonal window bay projects above the portico. The south facade has a two-story projecting rectangular bay. The interior retains much of its original period woodwork, the dining room having been remodeled c. 1900 in the Colonial Revival style.

The house was built in 1851 for Captain Isaac Merritt, a shipbuilder and owner, whose brother Samuel Merritt, was also a successful businessman. Merritt died in 1862, the house was later sold to William Rogers, another shipbuilder. The house's fine exterior and interior are symbolic of the city's success and significance as a shipbuilding and shipping center in the mid-19th century.

== See also ==
- National Register of Historic Places listings in Sagadahoc County, Maine
