= Clarke and Lake Company Archeological Site =

- U.S. National Register of Historic Places
- Nearest city: Arrowsic, Maine
- Area: 30 acres (12 ha)
- Built: 1650
- NRHP reference No.: 78000329
- Added to NRHP: November 21, 1978

The Clarke and Lake Company Archeological Site encompasses all that is left of a historic colonial settlement in Arrowsic, Maine. The site, located on the banks of the Sasanoa River on the northern part of Arrowsic Island, was the local headquarters of the business enterprises operated by Major Thomas Clarke and Captain Thomas Lake. Clarke and Lake were successful merchants and businessmen based in Boston, who at their height claimed more than 450 square miles (120,000 ha) of territory in the Kennebec River watershed, in addition to land holdings and business interests elsewhere. They acquired Arrowsic Island, and established their settlement c. 1654, eventually building a large manor house, warehouse, gristmill and sawmill, and numerous other outbuildings. They developed a small community on the island, with farms and shops, and managed the civic business of the area. Their business included trade with the local Native Americans, fishing, lumbering, and the raising of cattle for shipment to Boston.

Natives destroyed the settlement in the Northwest Coast Campaign (1676) on August 14, 1676, during King Philip's War, a major uprising of the Native population in New England against European settlers. More than 30 settlers were killed at the settlement, and Thomas Lake, who escaped during the attack, was hunted down and killed. The settlement was abandoned, and Thomas Clarke chose not to rebuild it. In 1679 Sir Edmund Andros, then governor of the Province of New York, granted a township called "Newtown" on the southern part of the island as part of an attempt to reinforce a New York claim to the area.

The remains of the original Clark and Lake settlement were first identified in the 1890s by a local historian, and underwent significant archaeological excavation in the late 1960s and 1970s. Finds at the site, in addition to artifacts dating to the settlement period, include prehistoric artifacts dating back more than 10,000 years.

The site was listed on the National Register of Historic Places in 1978.

== See also ==
- National Register of Historic Places listings in Sagadahoc County, Maine

== Sources ==
- Baker, Emerson (1985). The Clarke & Lake Company: the historical archaeology of a seventeenth-century Maine settlement. Maine Historic Preservation Commission. OCLC 12953271.
