= Butterfield-Sampson House =

Historic house in Maine, United States

- U.S. National Register of Historic Places
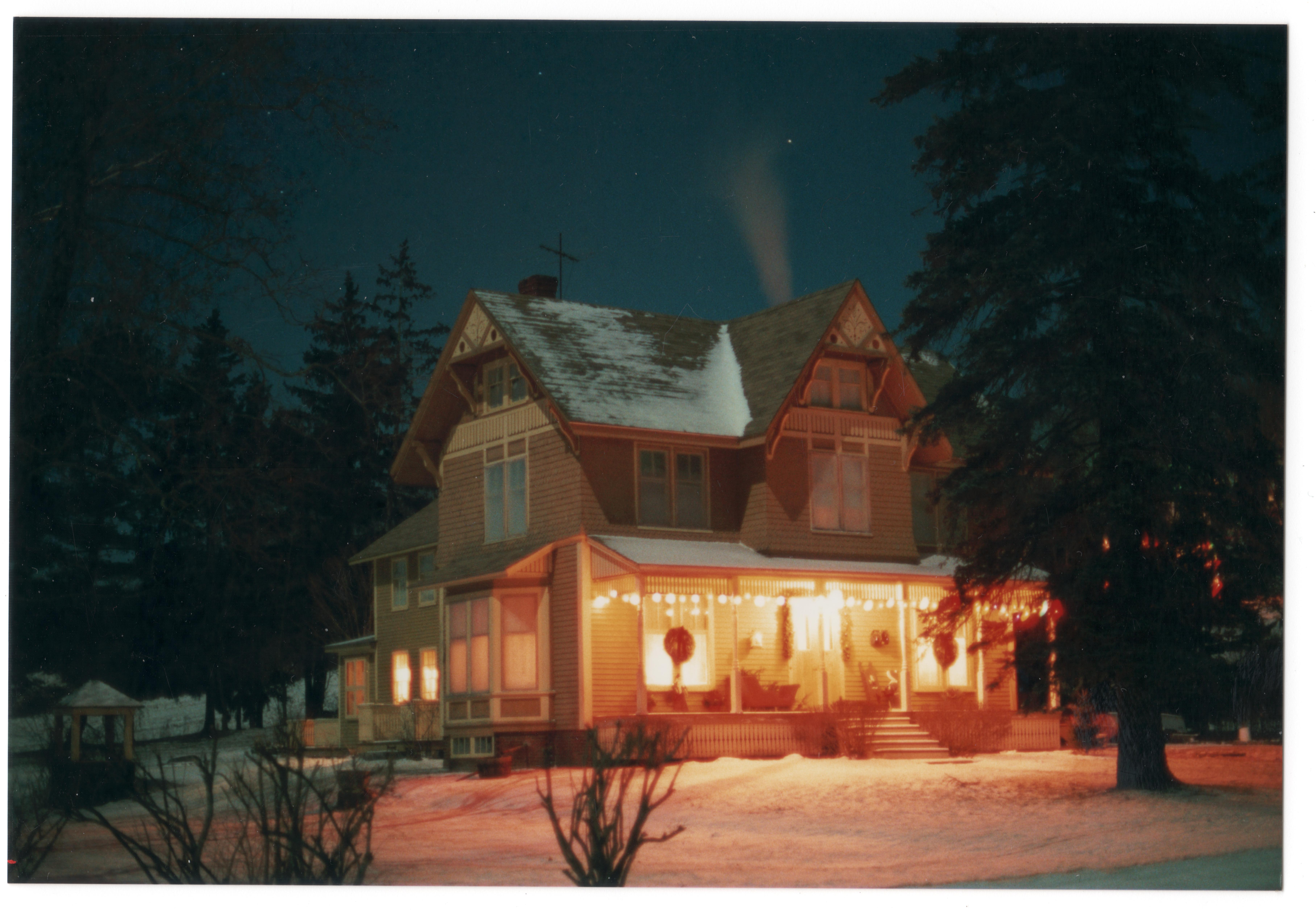

- Location within Maine Location within the United States
- Location: 18 River Rd., Bowdoinham, Maine
- Coordinates: 44°0′28″N 69°53′51″W
- Area: less than one acre
- Built: 1820
- Architectural style: Federal, Stick/Eastlake
- NRHP reference No.: 96001190
- Added to NRHP: October 24, 1996

The Butterfield-Sampson House is a historic house at 18 River Road in Bowdoinham, Maine. It is an unusual combination of an early 19th-century Federal period house, to which a Stick style house was added about 1890. The latter portion is a rare example in the state of a mail-order design from Palliser & Palliser. The house was listed on the National Register of Historic Places in 1996.

== Description and history ==
The Butterfield-Sampson House stands in the village center of Bowdoinham, on the west side of River Road (Maine State Route 24), just north of Railroad Avenue. The house is a 2 1/2-story wood-frame structure, with a cross-gabled roof covering the main block and a gabled roof covering the older rear ell. The exterior is clad in a combination of wooden clapboards and scallop-cut wooden shingles, and it is set on a brick foundation. A single-story porch extends across the front facade, with slender columns and a spindled frieze beneath a shed roof. The front-facing gable has a deep eave decorated with Stick style applied woodwork and large brackets.

The rear ell of the house is its original portion. It is a 2 1/2-story five-bay wood-frame structure, one room deep, oriented facing north (the current main block faces east). Its construction date is uncertain, but based on architectural evidence was probably built in the 1810s. In the 1840s that house was purchased by the railroad which runs just out of the property, and was sold 1861 to Robert Butterfield, the local postmaster, and in 1888 to Harriet Sampson. The Stick style main block was probably built soon after that sale, moving the old house further back on the property. It matches fairly closely Plate VII of Palliser's Model Homes, published in 1878 by the Palliser & Palliser Company of Bridgeport, Connecticut. Stick style architecture is generally uncommon in Maine, and the number of documented houses built to mail-order plans are also relatively few.

== See also ==
- National Register of Historic Places listings in Sagadahoc County, Maine
