= Mill Cove School =

- U.S. National Register of Historic Places
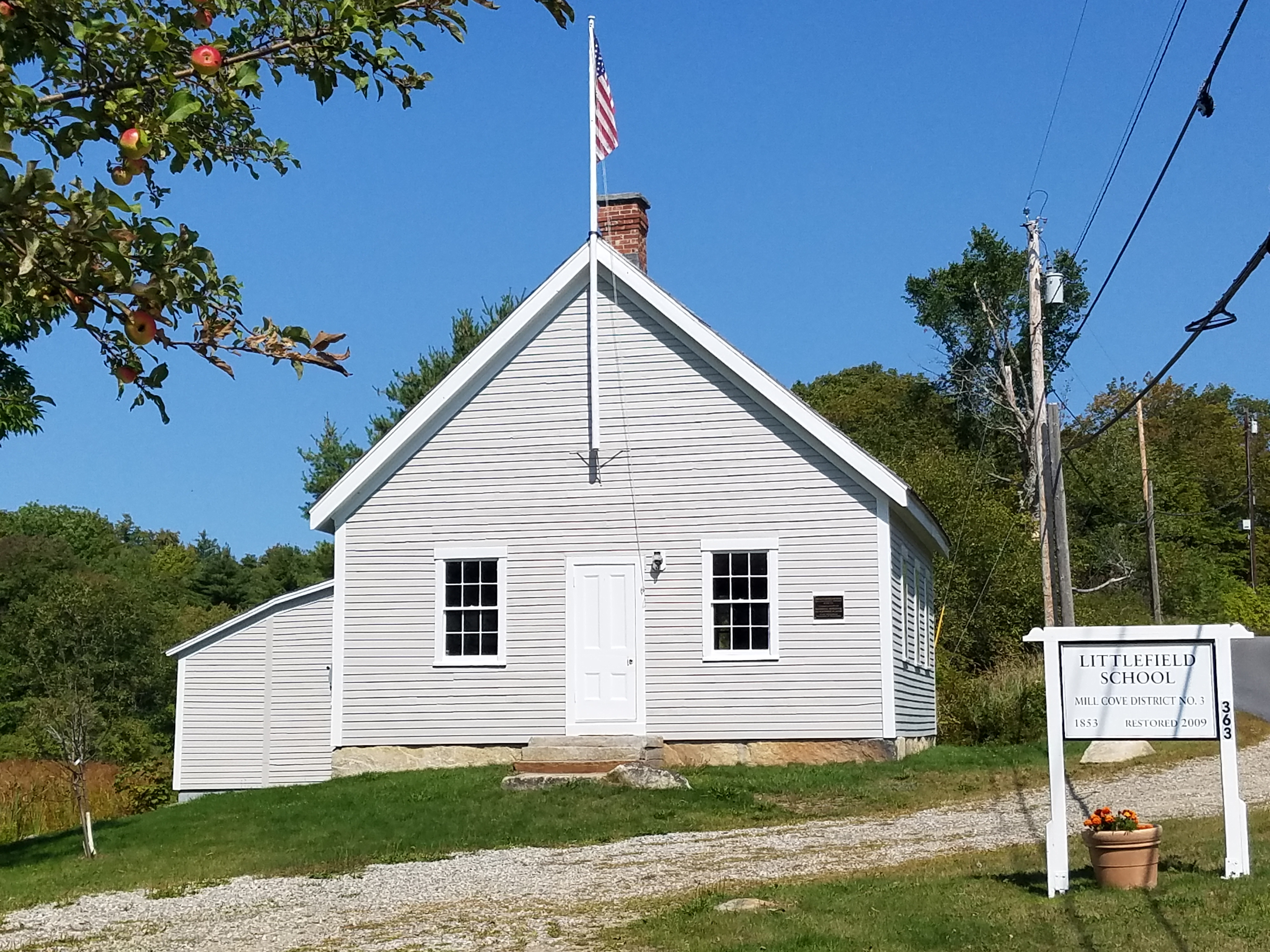

- Location within Maine Location within the United States
- Location: Western side of Berrys Mill Rd., 0.1 miles south of its junction with Hill Rd., West Bath, Maine
- Coordinates: 43°52′52″N 69°51′3″W
- Area: less than one acre
- Built: 1853
- Architectural style: Mid 19th Century Revival
- NRHP reference No.: 00000763
- Added to NRHP: July 5, 2000

The Mill Cove School, also known as the Littlefield School House, is a historic school building on Berrys Mill Road in West Bath, Maine. Built about 1853, it is the town's last surviving unaltered district school house. It underwent restoration in the early 2000s, and was listed on the National Register of Historic Places in 2000.

== Description and history ==
The Mill Cove School is located near the geographic center of West Bath, on the west side of Berrys Mill Road, one of the community's major north-south routes, about 0.1 miles (0.16 km) south of its junction with Hill Road. It is a single-story wood frame structure, with a tall pitched gabled roof and clapboard siding. The building is oriented facing south, with the roof gable parallel to the road. Its main facade consists of a pair of sash windows flanking a center entrance, all with simple framed surrounds. The side facing the street has three sash windows, while the west side has a projecting outhouse ell. The interior retains some 19th-century fixtures and trim, including a blackboard.

The school was built about 1853, for use in the Mill Cove District, which had been in existence since the 1770s, when the area was still part of Bath. West Bath had as many as four school districts, and this school is the only one to surviving without significant alteration. It remained in service as a municipal school until 1946. From 1946 until 1975 it was used as a clubhouse by the West Bath Men's Club, and was then abandoned. The town sought its demolition beginning in 1998, but local outcry resulted in the formation of a nonprofit dedicated to its care and restoration.

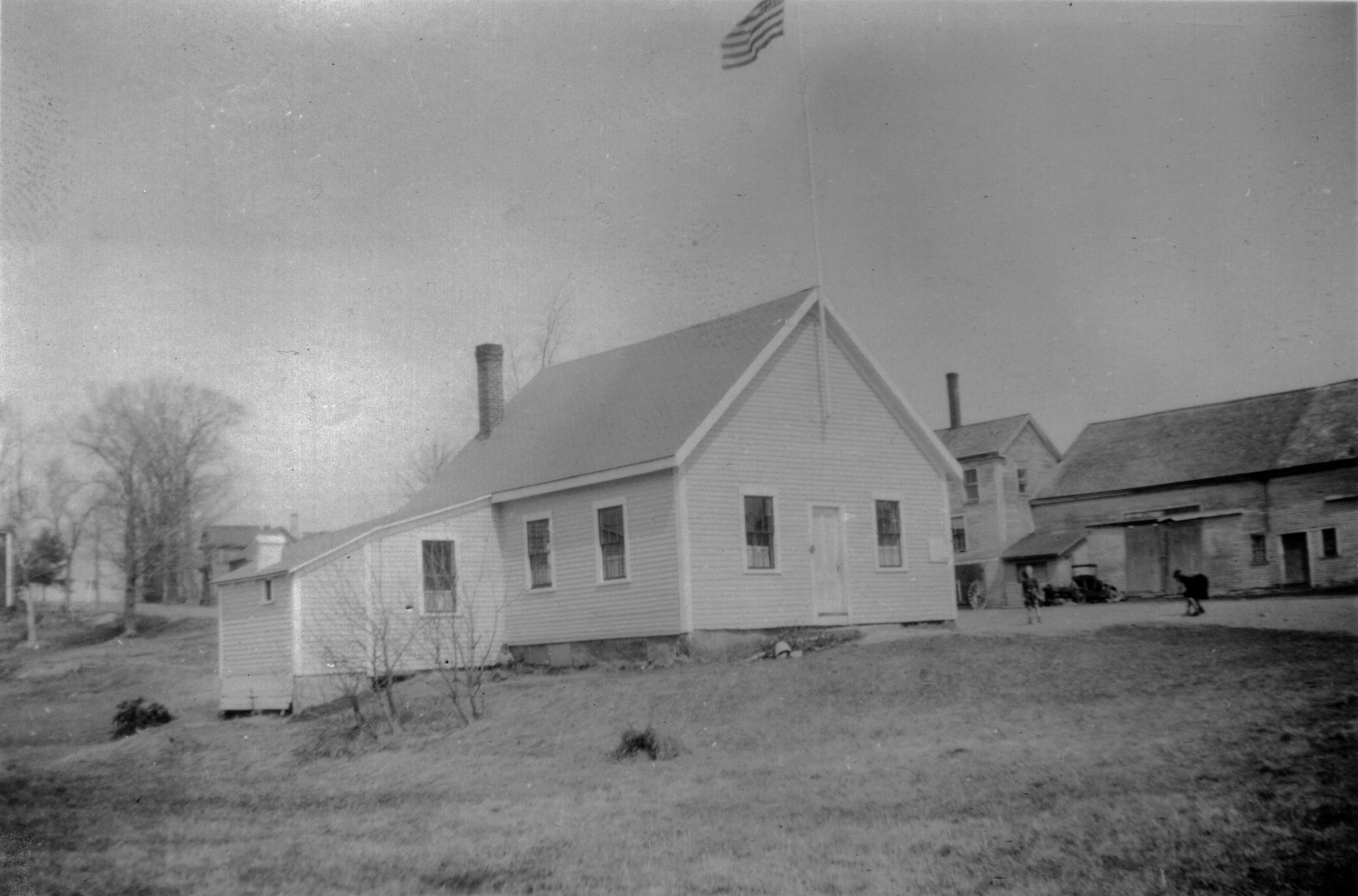
The Littlefield School in West Bath, Maine ca. 1939

== See also ==
- National Register of Historic Places listings in Sagadahoc County, Maine
