= Bath Historic District (Bath, Maine) =

Historic district in Maine, United States

- U.S. National Register of Historic Places
- U.S. Historic district
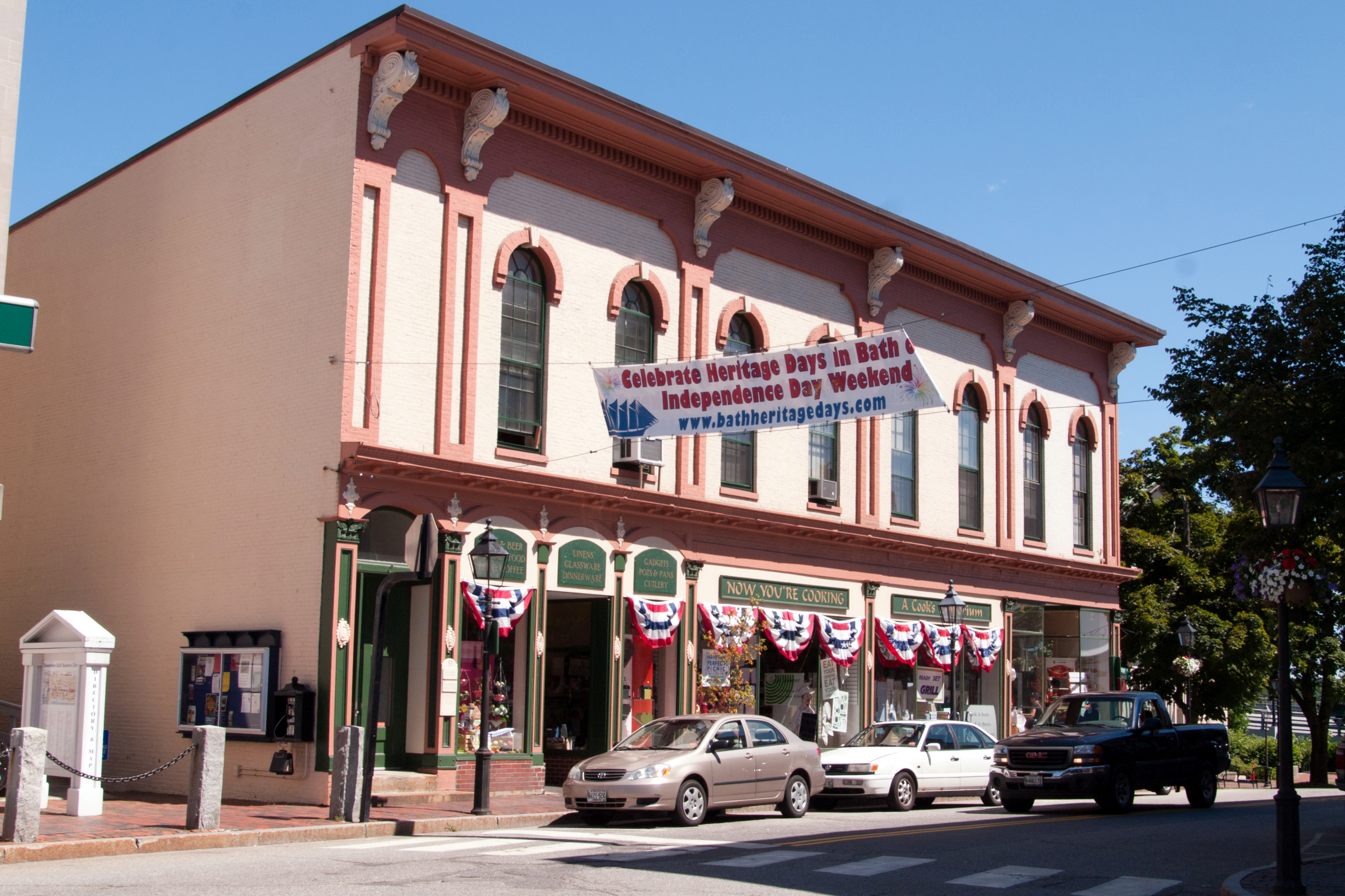
- Downtown Bath

- Location within Maine Location within the United States
- Location: Roughly bounded by High, Beacon, and Court Sts., U.S. 1 and Kennebec River, Bath, Maine
- Coordinates: 43°55′7″N 69°49′0″W
- Area: 300 acres (120 ha)
- Architectural style: Mid 19th Century Revival, Late Victorian
- NRHP reference No.: 73000261
- Added to NRHP: May 17, 1973

The Bath Historic District encompasses the historic 19th-century business district of Bath, Maine, along with an adjacent period neighborhood. The city has a long history as one of the nation's preeminent shipbuilding centers. The district was listed on the National Register of Historic Places in 1973.

== Description and history ==
What is now the city of Bath was first settled by Europeans in mid-17th century, and was from an early date recognized as an ideal spot for shipbuilding. It is set on a stretch of the lower Kennebec River that was originally called Long Reach, because it could be sailed without changing the rigging. The town was incorporated as Bath in 1781, named after Bath, England. In the 19th century the city grew up on the west bank of the river, with the banks lined by shipyards. West of the river neighborhoods grew up north and south of a central business district, now located just north of United States Route 1. The neighborhood north of the downtown area is where some of it finest early residential architecture is to be found. The city's fortunes started to decline with the advent of steel ships, but the 1889 founding of the Bath Iron Works (now the city's only shipyard), and its success as a major shipbuilder for the United States Navy buoyed the local economy.

The historic district is bounded on the south by US 1 and Centre Street, on the west by High Street, the north by Beacon Street, and the east by the Kennebec River. The downtown is located in the southeastern part of this area, and includes fine mid-19th buildings such as the former United States Customhouse and Post Office, designed by Ammi B. Young and built in 1853–58, the Sagadahoc County Courthouse, built 1869 to a design by Portland architect Francis H. Fassett, and the Italianate 1863 Church Block. The residential areas to the north and west include fine examples of Italianate and Greek Revival architecture.

== See also ==
- National Register of Historic Places listings in Sagadahoc County, Maine
