= National Register of Historic Places listings in Sagadahoc County, Maine =

Location of Sagadahoc County in Maine

This is a list of the National Register of Historic Places listings in Sagadahoc County, Maine.

This is intended to be a complete list of the properties and districts on the National Register of Historic Places in Sagadahoc County, Maine, United States. Latitude and longitude coordinates are provided for many National Register properties and districts; these locations may be seen together in a map.

There are 64 properties and districts listed on the National Register in the county (one, the Androscoggin Swinging Bridge, is also in Cumberland County and is also listed at National Register of Historic Places listings in Cumberland County, Maine). One property was once listed, but has since been removed.

This National Park Service list is complete through NPS recent listings posted May 1, 2026.

Contents: Counties and municipalities in Maine
Androscoggin - Aroostook - Cumberland (City of Portland) - Franklin - Hancock - Kennebec - Knox - Lincoln - Oxford - Penobscot - Piscataquis - Sagadahoc - Somerset - Waldo - Washington - York

== Current listings ==
	Name on the Register	Image	Date listed	Location	City or town	Description
1	Androscoggin Swinging Bridge	Androscoggin Swinging Bridge	January 14, 2004 (#03001404)	Spanning the Androscoggin River between Topsham and Brunswick; 43°55′06″N 69°58′26″W	Brunswick	
2	Arnold Trail to Quebec	Arnold Trail to Quebec	October 1, 1969 (#69000018)	Along the Kennebec River, through Wayman and Flagstaff Lakes along the Dead River and Chain of Ponds to Quebec Canada; 43°45′08″N 69°46′45″W	Popham Beach	Extends through Franklin, Kennebec, Sagadahoc, and Somerset counties
3	Bath Historic District	Bath Historic District	May 17, 1973 (#73000261)	Roughly bounded by High, Beacon, and Court Sts., U.S. Route 1, and the Kennebec River; 43°55′07″N 69°49′00″W	Bath	
4	Butterfield-Sampson House	Butterfield-Sampson House	October 24, 1996 (#96001190)	18 River Rd. 44°00′28″N 69°53′51″W	Bowdoinham	
5	Robert P. Carr House	Robert P. Carr House	December 18, 1990 (#90001904)	Main St. 44°00′36″N 69°53′53″W	Bowdoinham	
6	Cathance Water Tower	Cathance Water Tower	January 22, 2001 (#00001637)	Cathance Rd. at its junction with Beechwood Dr. 43°57′06″N 69°55′50″W	Topsham	
7	Clarke and Lake Company Archeological Site		November 21, 1978 (#78000329)	Address Restricted	Arrowsic	Site of a major colonial settlement; destroyed during King Philip's War and abandoned. Listed as being in the Bath vicinity.
8	Cold Spring Farm	Cold Spring Farm	February 14, 1985 (#85000274)	Off Fiddler's Reach Rd. 43°51′12″N 69°48′00″W	Phippsburg	
9	Viola Coombs House	Viola Coombs House	December 13, 1991 (#91001816)	Main St. 44°00′36″N 69°53′52″W	Bowdoinham	
10	Cornish House	Cornish House	January 15, 1980 (#80000250)	Main St. 44°00′34″N 69°54′08″W	Bowdoinham	
11	W.D. Crooker House	W.D. Crooker House	July 10, 1979 (#79000165)	71 South St. 43°54′28″N 69°49′08″W	Bath	
12	Days Ferry Historic District	Days Ferry Historic District	February 20, 1975 (#75000109)	North of Bath along State Route 128; 43°56′47″N 69°48′24″W	Woolwich	Listed as being in Bath vicinity.
13	William T. Donnell House	William T. Donnell House	July 13, 1989 (#89000840)	279 Washington St. 43°53′42″N 69°49′03″W	Bath	Owned by the Maine Maritime Museum.
14	Doubling Point Light Station	Doubling Point Light Station	January 21, 1988 (#87002271)	Western side of Arrowsic Island; 43°52′57″N 69°48′27″W	Arrowsic	Listed as being in Bath vicinity.
15	Fiddler's Reach Fog Signal	Fiddler's Reach Fog Signal	August 5, 2009 (#09000594)	Northern shore of the Kennebec River, east of the Doubling Point Light Station; 43°52′54″N 69°47′57″W	Arrowsic	
16	First Baptist Church of Bowdoin and Coombs Cemetery	First Baptist Church of Bowdoin and Coombs Cemetery	June 20, 1997 (#97000604)	Off the western side of U.S. Route 201, 0.65 miles north of its junction with State Route 125; 44°02′22″N 69°56′44″W	Bowdoin Center	
17	Fort Baldwin Historic Site	Fort Baldwin Historic Site	August 3, 1979 (#79000166)	Sabino Hill; 43°45′01″N 69°47′23″W	Phippsburg	
18	Fort Popham Memorial	Fort Popham Memorial	October 1, 1969 (#69000012)	North of Popham on Hunnewell Point; 43°45′19″N 69°47′04″W	Popham Beach	
19	Grey Havens Inn	Grey Havens Inn	March 21, 1985 (#85000614)	Reid Park Rd. 43°48′39″N 69°43′16″W	Georgetown	
20	Harward Family House	Harward Family House	September 27, 1996 (#96001038)	Western side of Pork Point Rd., 0.4 miles south of its junction with State Route 24; 44°01′48″N 69°49′35″W	Bowdoinham	Listed as being in Richmond vicinity.
21	Lt. Richard Hathorn House	Lt. Richard Hathorn House	February 26, 1980 (#80000251)	State Route 127; 43°57′39″N 69°47′07″W	Woolwich	
22	Heal Family House	Heal Family House	October 28, 1994 (#94001243)	Western side of State Route 127, 1.2 miles south of its junction with Robinhood Rd. 43°49′44″N 69°45′18″W	Georgetown	
23	Hunter Site	Hunter Site	January 26, 1984 (#84001493)	Address Restricted	Topsham	
24	John E.L. Huse Memorial School	John E.L. Huse Memorial School	July 11, 2016 (#16000438)	39 Andrews Rd. 43°54′51″N 69°49′33″W	Bath	
25	Hyde Mansion	Hyde Mansion	November 21, 1978 (#78000197)	616 High St. 43°54′19″N 69°49′23″W	Bath	
26	Charles H. Ingraham Cottage	Charles H. Ingraham Cottage	December 29, 1986 (#86003512)	Off State Route 209; 43°44′53″N 69°47′17″W	Phippsburg	
27	Kennebec River Light Station	Kennebec River Light Station	January 21, 1988 (#87002263)	Fiddler Reach, Arrowsic Island; 43°52′59″N 69°47′46″W	Arrowsic	Listed as being in Bath vicinity.
28	Gov. William King House	Gov. William King House	May 24, 1976 (#76000112)	Whiskeag Rd. 43°55′58″N 69°49′25″W	Bath	
29	Malaga Island		September 19, 2023 (#100009365)	Malaga Island; 43°46′54″N 69°52′30″W	Phippsburg	
30	Joseph and Susan Manley Summer Cottage	Joseph and Susan Manley Summer Cottage	January 7, 1998 (#97001642)	Eastern side of Club Rd., 0.1 miles south of its junction with State Route 216 and Club Rd. 43°43′24″N 69°50′14″W	Small Point	
31	Mary E. (Schooner)	Mary E. (Schooner)	September 30, 2019 (#100004471)	271 Washington St. (Maine Maritime Museum); 43°53′41″N 69°48′54″W	Bath	
32	McCobb-Hill-Minott House	McCobb-Hill-Minott House	November 23, 1977 (#77000083)	Parker Head Rd. 43°49′10″N 69°48′43″W	Phippsburg	
33	Captain Merritt House	Captain Merritt House	February 8, 1985 (#85000243)	619 High St. 43°54′25″N 69°49′13″W	Bath	
34	Mill Cove School	Mill Cove School	July 5, 2000 (#00000763)	Western side of Berrys Mill Rd., 0.1 miles south of its junction with Hill Rd. 43°52′52″N 69°51′03″W	West Bath	Listed as being in Bath vicinity.
35	Peacock Tavern	Peacock Tavern	April 4, 1986 (#86000675)	U.S. Route 201; 44°09′33″N 69°51′42″W	Richmond	
36	Pejepscot Paper Company	Pejepscot Paper Company	September 17, 1974 (#74000192)	Off U.S. Route 201 at the Androscoggin River; 43°55′18″N 69°57′53″W	Topsham	Also known as Bowdoin Mill
37	Pejepscot Site		June 12, 1987 (#87000922)	Address Restricted	Pejepscot	
38	Percy and Small Shipyard	Percy and Small Shipyard	July 27, 1971 (#71000043)	451 Washington St. 43°53′41″N 69°49′08″W	Bath	This is now the main campus of the Maine Maritime Museum.
39	Percy District School House, (Former)	Percy District School House, (Former)	March 25, 1999 (#99000377)	Junction of Parker Head Rd. and Cox Head Rd. 43°46′04″N 69°48′06″W	Parker Head	
40	Perkins Island Light Station	Perkins Island Light Station	January 21, 1988 (#87002282)	Perkins Island; 43°47′12″N 69°47′09″W	Georgetown	
41	Popham Colony Site	Popham Colony Site	February 16, 1970 (#70000063)	near Fort Popham on Fort Baldwin Rd. 43°45′12″N 69°47′18″W	Popham Beach	
42	Purinton Family Farm	Purinton Family Farm	July 13, 1989 (#89000842)	65 Elm St. 43°55′27″N 69°57′05″W	Topsham	
43	Randall-Hildreth House	Randall-Hildreth House	September 22, 2004 (#04001048)	806 Foreside Rd. 43°56′58″N 69°53′42″W	Topsham	
44	Robert Reed House	Robert Reed House	February 11, 1982 (#82000777)	State Route 128 and Chop Point Rd. 44°00′16″N 69°48′34″W	Woolwich	
45	Richmond Historic District	Richmond Historic District	November 12, 1973 (#73000146)	Roughly bounded by South, High, and Kimbal Sts., and the Kennebec River; 44°05′08″N 69°48′15″W	Richmond	
46	Benjamin Riggs House	Benjamin Riggs House	December 22, 1988 (#88003008)	14 Knubble Rd. 43°51′13″N 69°44′12″W	Georgetown	
47	Riggs-Zorach House	Riggs-Zorach House	December 30, 1988 (#88003007)	Off Robinhood Rd. 43°50′51″N 69°44′11″W	Georgetown	
48	Robinhood Free Meetinghouse	Robinhood Free Meetinghouse	September 26, 2016 (#16000677)	210 Robinhood Rd. 43°51′05″N 69°44′36″W	Georgetown	
49	Ropes End	Ropes End	December 31, 2001 (#01001421)	36 Hyde Rd. 43°43′24″N 69°50′12″W	Phippsburg	
50	Seguin Island Light Station	Seguin Island Light Station	March 8, 1977 (#77000084)	South of Georgetown; 43°42′32″N 69°45′29″W	Georgetown	
51	Small Point Club	Small Point Club	March 25, 1999 (#99000376)	Club Rd., 0.3 miles south of its junction with State Route 216 and Club Rd. 43°43′16″N 69°50′14″W	Small Point	
52	Snipe Farm		December 28, 2023 (#100009659)	157 Arrowsic Road; 43°53′51″N 69°47′59″W	Arrowsic	
53	Southard Block	Southard Block	February 23, 1972 (#72000079)	25 Front St. 44°05′13″N 69°48′01″W	Richmond	
54	Squirrel Point Light Station	Squirrel Point Light Station	January 21, 1988 (#87002281)	Squirrel Point, Arrowsic Island; 43°48′59″N 69°48′10″W	Arrowsic	
55	Stone Schoolhouse	Stone Schoolhouse	August 12, 1977 (#77000085)	South of Georgetown on Bay Point Rd. 43°46′45″N 69°45′54″W	Georgetown	
56	Swan Island Historic District	Swan Island Historic District	December 14, 1995 (#95001461)	Kennebec River between Richmond and Dresden; 44°03′32″N 69°47′59″W	Perkins Township	
57	Topsham Fairgrounds Grandstand	Topsham Fairgrounds Grandstand	March 26, 1992 (#92000277)	Off the northern side of Elm St., east of its junction with Fair Cir. 43°55′38″N 69°57′12″W	Topsham	
58	Topsham Historic District	Topsham Historic District	January 9, 1978 (#78000198)	Elm, Main, and Green Sts. 43°55′35″N 69°57′30″W	Topsham	
59	Trufant Historic District	Trufant Historic District	January 15, 2004 (#03001402)	Portions of Corliss, Highland, Middle, Pine, and Washington Sts. 43°54′02″N 69°49′05″W	Bath	
60	U.S. Customhouse and Post Office	U.S. Customhouse and Post Office	October 6, 1970 (#70000064)	1 Front St. 43°54′44″N 69°48′48″W	Bath	
61	Wallace-Haskell Homestead	Wallace-Haskell Homestead	January 17, 2017 (#100000526)	268 W. Point Rd. 43°45′05″N 69°51′32″W	Phippsburg	
62	Washington Park Historic District		March 19, 2024 (#100010084)	Park and Winship Streets; 43°55′48″N 69°48′56″W	Bath	
63	Winter Street Church	Winter Street Church	July 27, 1971 (#71000044)	Corner of Washington and Winter Sts. 43°54′58″N 69°49′07″W	Bath	
64	Woolwich Town House	Woolwich Town House	February 17, 1978 (#78000199)	Northeast of Bath at Old Stage and Dana Mills Rds. 43°58′10″N 69°46′12″W	Woolwich	

== Former listing ==
	Name on the Register	Image	Date listed	Date removed	Location	City or town	Description
1	SEGUIN (tugboat)	SEGUIN (tugboat)	December 2, 1969 (#69000013)	September 29, 2015	Maine Maritime Museum; 43°53′39″N 69°48′59″W	Bath	Remnants stored at museum after failed restoration attempt.

== See also ==
- List of National Historic Landmarks in Maine
- National Register of Historic Places listings in Maine
