= First Baptist Church of Bowdoin and Coombs Cemetery =

Historic church in Maine, United States

- U.S. National Register of Historic Places
- U.S. Historic district
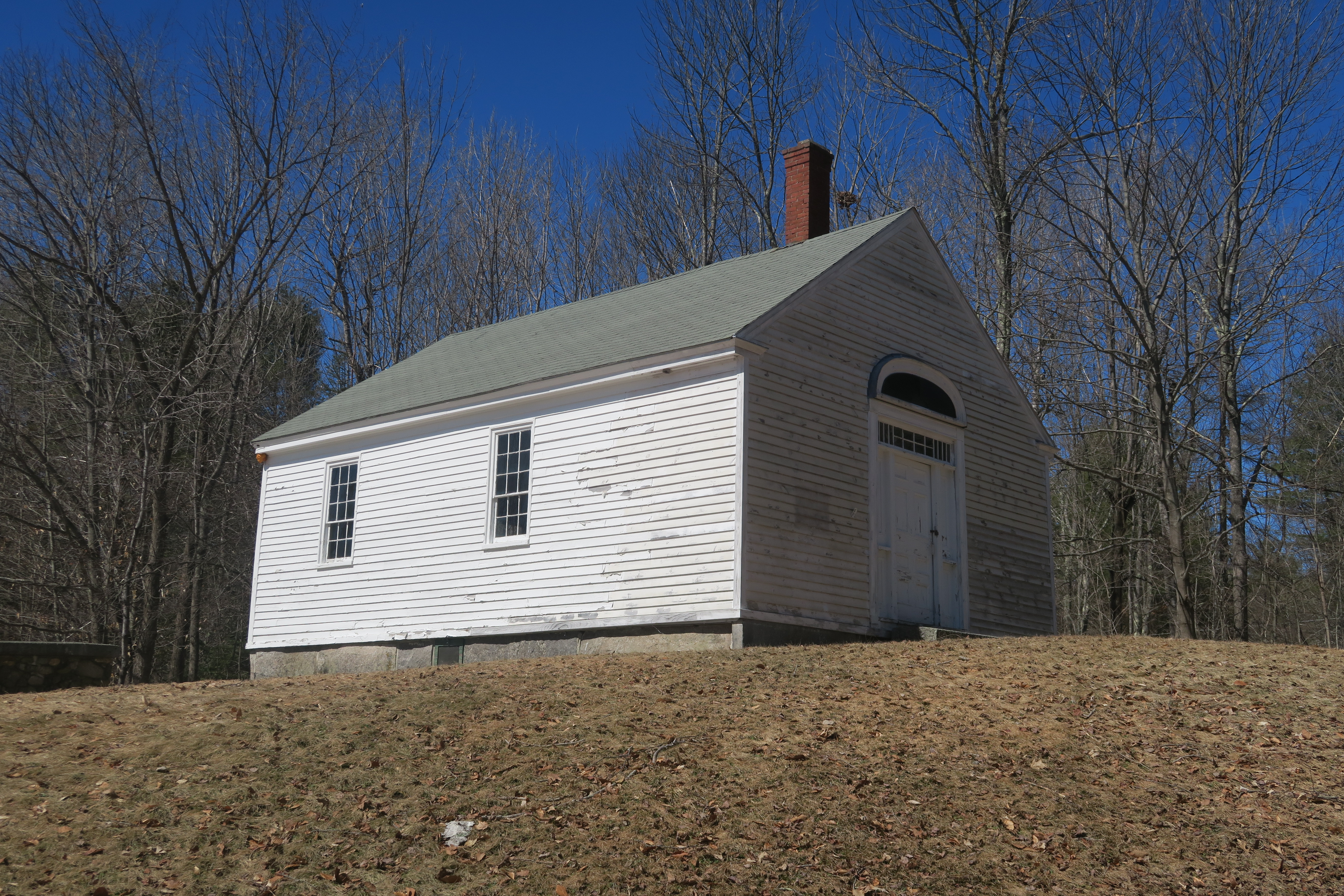

- Location within Maine Location within the United States
- Location: off US 201, Bowdoin, Maine
- Coordinates: 44°2′22″N 69°56′44″W
- Area: 2 acres (0.81 ha)
- Built: 1839
- Architectural style: Federal, Greek Revival
- NRHP reference No.: 97000604
- Added to NRHP: June 20, 1997

The First Baptist Church of Bowdoin and Coombs Cemetery are an historic church and cemetery in Bowdoin, Maine. The church, a modest transitional Federal style-Greek Revival building, was built in 1839 for a congregation founded in 1788, and the cemetery is of similar antiquity. The property was the first in the town to be the subject of active preservation efforts. It was listed on the National Register of Historic Places in 1997.

== Description and history ==
The First Baptist Church is set on a rural parcel in central eastern Bowdoin, a few hundred feet west of United States Route 201. It and the adjacent cemetery are accessed via an unlabeled dirt road that runs west across an open field and into the woods surrounding the church and cemetery. The church is a modest single-story wood-frame structure, with a gabled roof, clapboard siding, and a granite foundation. The main facade, facing east, has an elaborate entrance, the door framed by panels and a transom window, with pilasters and a Federal style fan as an outer surround. The sides each have two windows. The interior has a vestibule that opens into the sanctuary, which has three sections of bench pews and a raised pulpit.

The cemetery which stands behind the church is a family cemetery that belonged to the Eaton and Coombs families. It is surrounded by a low stone wall, added in 1900 when the church underwent restoration.

The First Baptist Church of Bowdoin was organized in 1788, and its first church was built in 1799. That building was destroyed by an arsonist in 1834, and the present building was constructed soon afterward. The congregation, apparently always small, dwindled during the 19th century, and the property eventually reverted to members of the Coombs family, on whose land it had been built. John and Viola Coombs in 1900 undertook the restoration of the church and their ancestral cemetery. Viola Coombs gave Bowdoin College an endowment for its maintenance. The college has since transferred the endowment and responsibility for the property's care to the local historical society.

== See also ==
- National Register of Historic Places listings in Sagadahoc County, Maine
