= Days Ferry Historic District =

Historic district in Maine, United States

- U.S. National Register of Historic Places
- U.S. Historic district
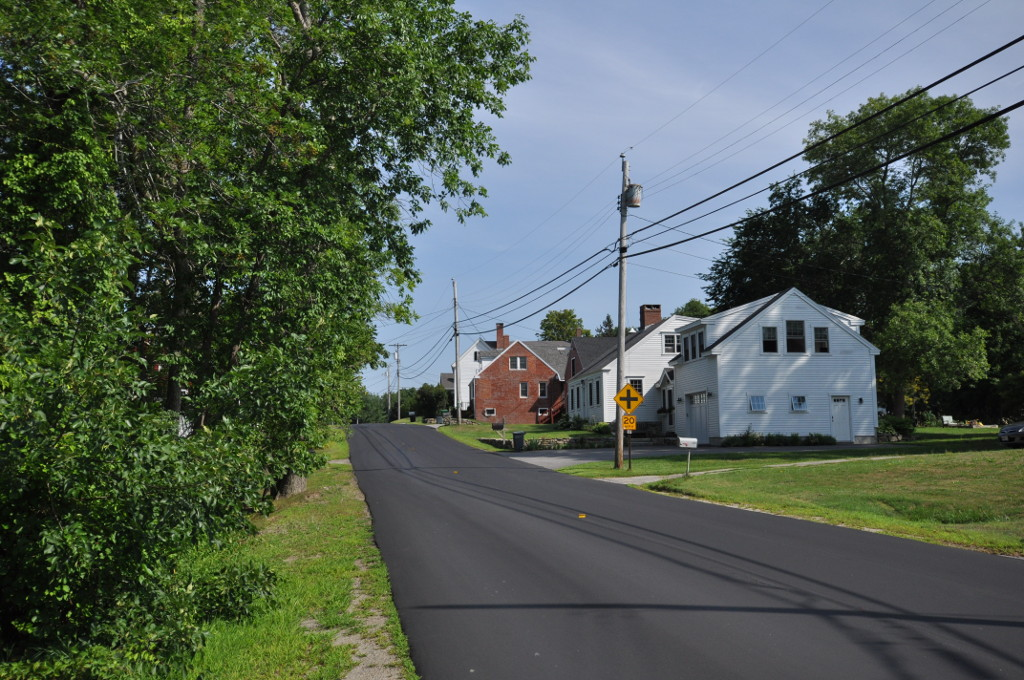

- Location within Maine Location within the United States
- Location: River and Old Stage Rds., Woolwich, Maine
- Coordinates: 43°56′47″N 69°48′24″W
- Area: 600 acres (240 ha)
- Built: 1754
- Architectural style: Colonial, Federal, Greek Revival
- NRHP reference No.: 75000109
- Added to NRHP: February 20, 1975

The Days Ferry Historic District encompasses a rural village that grew around a ferry crossing on the Kennebec River in what is now Woolwich, Maine. The village and ferry were on the main stage route between Bath and Wiscasset until the 1870s, and retains a concentration of well-preserved 18th and early 19th-century houses. The district was listed on the National Register of Historic Places in 1975.

== Description and history ==
The area that is now Woolwich has seen colonial settlement since the mid-17th century, and was the site of one of the last Native American attacks on the lower Kennebec River. Originally part of Georgetown, Woolwich was incorporated in 1759. The Days Ferry village became the site of the principal river crossing on the lower Kennebec, and the stagecoach road was built from the ferry to Wiscasset further east. Economic activity in the area included shipbuilding, ice harvesting, fishing, and brickmaking. Bath, its commercial center located downriver a few miles, was economically more important, and in the 1870s a steam ferry began operating there, reducing the importance of Days Ferry.

The Days Ferry village is centered at the junction of River Road (Maine State Route 128) and the Old Stage Road. There is a cluster of residences near this junction, which gradually disperses to the south and east. On the north side of Old Stage Road stand a cluster of civic buildings, including the c. 1833 Days Ferry Church, the 1808 schoolhouse, and the fine c. 1833 Federal style house historically occupied by the village doctor. Right near the junction stands the village's oldest house, the 1750 Samuel Harden House, a classic five-bay Colonial with a combination of Georgian and Federal styles. By the old ferry landing stands the Robert White Tavern, a Federal style home, originally built as a tavern about 1760 and later modified to be a residence. At the southern end of the district, near the junction of SR 128 with Maine State Route 127, stands the c. 1777 house of Jonathan Preble. Most of the remaining houses are modest 1-1/2 to 2 1/2-story structures, either brick or wood frame, with Federal or Greek Revival styling. There are few buildings built after 1850 in the area.

== See also ==
- National Register of Historic Places listings in Sagadahoc County, Maine
