= Heal Family House =

Historic house in Maine, United States

- U.S. National Register of Historic Places
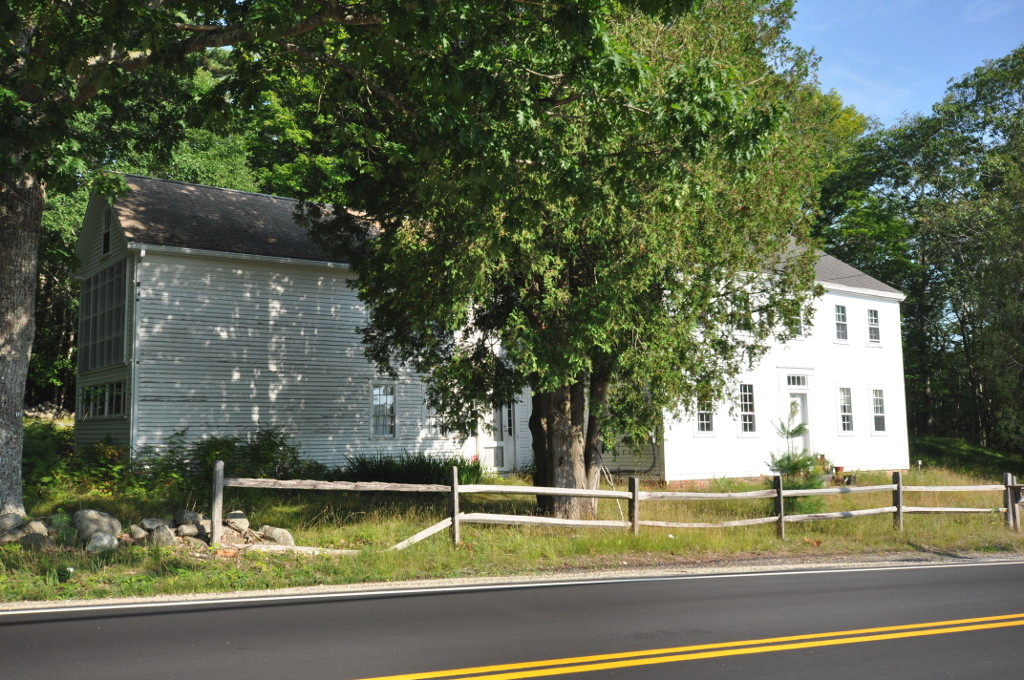

- Location within Maine Location within the United States
- Location: ME 127, Georgetown, Maine
- Coordinates: 43°49′44″N 69°45′18″W
- Area: 159 acres (64 ha)
- Built: 1798
- Architectural style: Federal
- NRHP reference No.: 94001243
- Added to NRHP: October 28, 1994

The Heal Family House, also known as the Washington Heal House, is a historic house on Maine State Route 127 in Georgetown, Maine. Built about 1798, it is one of a small number of surviving Federal period houses in the rural community. It was owned for more than 100 years by members of the Heal family. It was listed on the National Register of Historic Places in 1994.

== Description and history ==
The Heal House is located on a rural stretch of Maine Route 127, about 1.2 miles (1.9 km) south of its junction with Robinhood Road. The house stands on the west side of the road, but is associated with a large (159-acre (64 ha)) property, most of which is on the east side. Once used for agriculture and dairy farming, most of this land has reverted to forest. The house is a 2 1/2-story wood-frame structure, five bays wide, with a gabled roof, central chimney, clapboard siding, and a foundation of brick and rubblestone. Its windows (nine-over-six sash on the ground floor, six-over-six on the second) are framed by molding with a raised outer edge. The main entrance is centered, and is framed by pilasters, with a transom and corniced entablature above. A recessed two-story wing extends to the left of the main block. The interior follows a typical center chimney plan, with a narrow winding staircase in the front vestibule, the parlor to the right of the chimney, and the kitchen to its left.

The house was probably built in 1798 by William Heal, who was probably engaged in agricultural pursuits rather than fishing, given the house's inland location. His son Washington established a dairy herd on the property, and may have operated a tidally powered mill on Robinhood Cove. After his death the property was sold out of the family.

== See also ==
- National Register of Historic Places listings in Sagadahoc County, Maine
