= Hyde Mansion =

Historic house in Maine, United States

- U.S. National Register of Historic Places
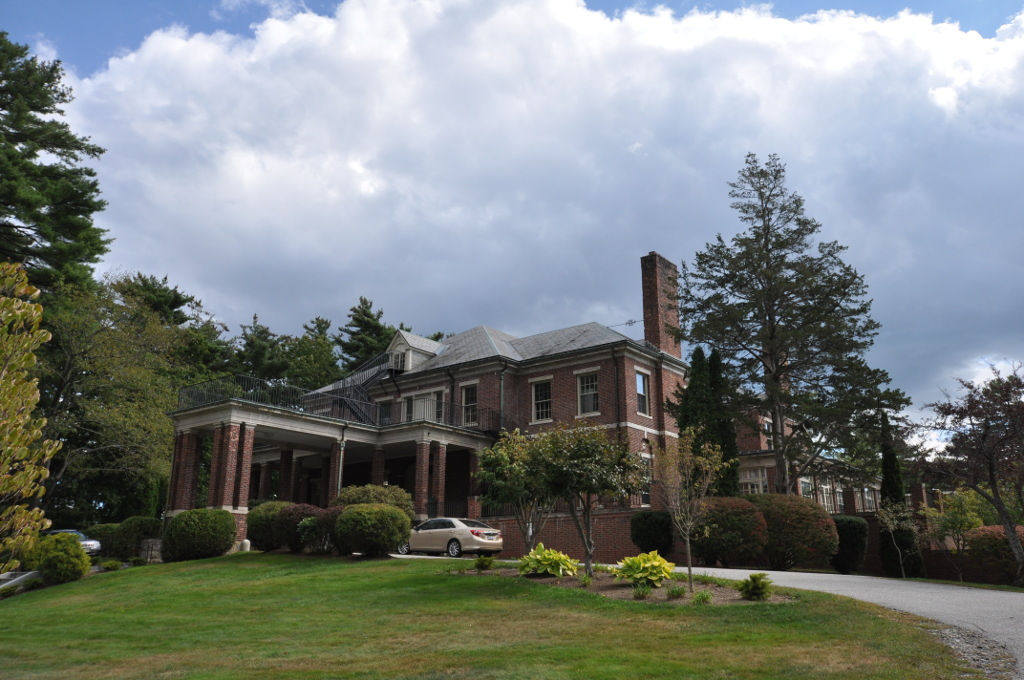

- Location within Maine Location within the United States
- Location: 616 High St., Bath, Maine
- Coordinates: 43°54′19″N 69°49′23″W
- Area: 4 acres (1.6 ha)
- Built: 1913
- Architect: John Calvin Stevens
- Landscape architect: Carl Rust Parker
- Architectural style: Colonial Revival
- NRHP reference No.: 78000197
- Added to NRHP: November 21, 1978

The Hyde Mansion, originally known as Elmhurst, is a historic house at 616 High Street in Bath, Maine, United States. Now the main building on the Bath campus of The Hyde Schools, it was built in 1913 for John Sedgewick Hyde, the son of Bath Iron Works (BIW) founder Thomas W. Hyde. It was designed by John Calvin Stevens, and is an example of Colonial Revival architecture. It was listed on the National Register of Historic Places in 1978.

== Description and history ==
The Hyde Mansion is located on the heights of Bath's west side, roughly west of the Bath Iron Works complex on the west side of High Street. It is set on a landscaped estate that now houses the facilities of the Hyde School. It is a 2 1/2-story brick building with trim of wood and stone. It is covered by a hip roof, and has extended brick chimneys at either end. A porch extends across the central portion of the front facade, with a narrower porte-cochere extending further out; both are supported by square brick columns with stone capitals. The school has added a modern wing, sympathetic in materials and style, to the south side of the building.

The mansion was designed by Maine's leading architect of the early 20th century, John Calvin Stevens, and was completed in 1913. The grounds on the west side of the house were landscaped in the Italian garden style by Carl Rust Parker, a landscape architect from Portland. The mansion was built for John Sedgewick Hyde, the son of Bath Iron Works founder Thomas W. Hyde, on land that had been in the family since the early 19th century. Hyde was then the owner of BIW, having purchased it from Charles M. Schwab in 1905. The younger Hyde is credited with developing the works as a leading naval shipyard in the following decades.

In 1947, Hyde's heirs donated the estate to the Pine Tree Society for Crippled Children, for use as rehabilitation and convalescent facility. In 1966, the estate became the campus of The Hyde Schools. The interior of house was extensively damaged by fire in the 1970s, but was meticulously restored.

== See also ==
- National Register of Historic Places listings in Sagadahoc County, Maine
