= Hunter Site =

- U.S. National Register of Historic Places
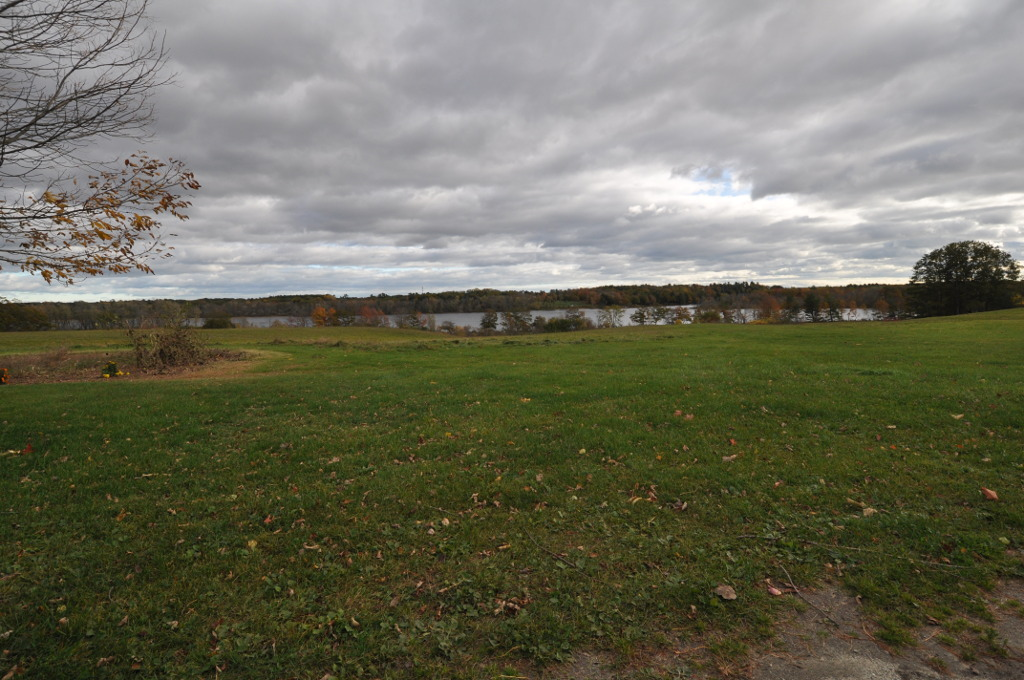
- Location: Topsham, Maine
- Area: 16 acres (6.5 ha)
- NRHP reference No.: 84001493
- Added to NRHP: January 26, 1984

The Hunter Site, designated 15.110 by the Maine Historic Preservation Commission and also known as the Hunter Farm Site, is a prehistoric archaeological site on the banks of the Androscoggin River in Topsham, Maine. The site, located on the Hunter family farm in eastern Topsham, is a Late Archaic Native American habitation site, dating to 4000–5000 years before present. Finds at the site include calcined fragments of fish bones, indicative that the inhabitants' diet included striped bass and sturgeon. Stone tools, including projectile points, have also been found at the site.

The site was listed on the National Register of Historic Places in 1984.

== See also ==
- National Register of Historic Places listings in Sagadahoc County, Maine
