= Lt. Richard Hathorn House =

Historic house in Maine, United States

- U.S. National Register of Historic Places
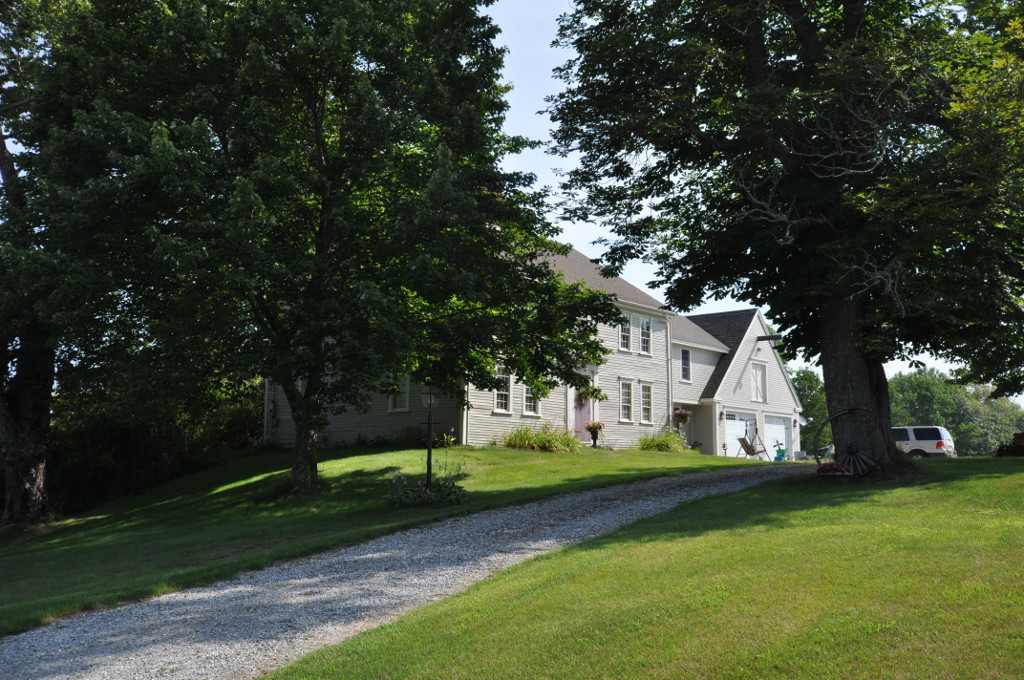

- Location within Maine Location within the United States
- Location: ME 127, Woolwich, Maine
- Coordinates: 43°57′57″N 69°46′58″W
- Area: 1 acre (0.40 ha)
- Built: 1784
- Architectural style: Federal
- NRHP reference No.: 80000251
- Added to NRHP: February 26, 1980

The Lt. Richard Hathorn House is a historic house on Maine State Route 127 in Woolwich, Maine, USA. Built in 1784, it is one of the best-preserved early Federal period houses in Maine's Mid Coast region. It was listed on the National Register of Historic Places in 1980.

== Description and history ==
The Hathorn House is located on the east side of Route 127, just north of Misty Hollow Drive and west of the northern part of Nequasset Lake. It is a 2 1/2-story wood-frame structure, oriented facing south, and is five bays wide, with a side-gable roof, central chimney, clapboard siding and a fieldstone foundation. Its windows are simply framed, and its central entrance has an elaborate surround, with Ionic pilasters supporting an entablature and cornice. The interior is largely original, with five fireplaces which include a massive kitchen hearth with beehive oven, and fine wood paneling in many of its rooms. An ell extends to the right of the main block.

The house was built in 1784 by Richard Hathorn, a veteran of the American Revolutionary War. The only significant modernizing elements made to the house are the introduction of plumbing and electricity. It is one of the least-altered houses of the period in the Maine Mid Coast region.

== See also ==
- National Register of Historic Places listings in Sagadahoc County, Maine
