= Robert Reed House =

Historic house in Maine, United States

- U.S. National Register of Historic Places
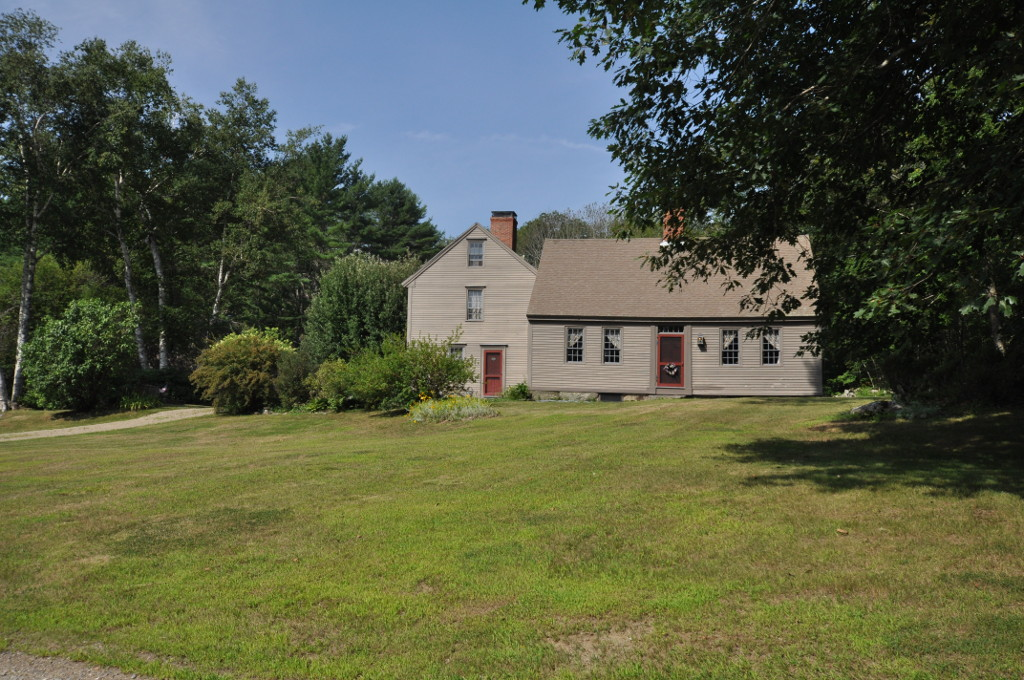

- Location within Maine Location within the United States
- Location: ME 128 and Chop Point Rd., Woolrich, Maine
- Coordinates: 44°0′16″N 69°48′34″W
- Area: 0.5 acres (0.20 ha)
- Built: 1765
- Built by: Reed, Robert
- Architectural style: Colonial
- NRHP reference No.: 82000777
- Added to NRHP: February 11, 1982

The Robert Reed House, also known as the Robert P. Tristram Coffin House, is a historic house at Chop Point Road and Maine State Route 128 in Woolwich, Maine. Built in 1765, it is one of the area's oldest houses, and a distinct example of two period houses that have been joined. The house is also notable as the home of the Pulitzer Prize-winning poet Robert P. Tristram Coffin. It was listed on the National Register of Historic Places in 1982.

== Description and history ==
The Robert Reed House is set on the west side of Chop Point Road, just south of its junction with SR 128. It consists of three sections: an east-facing 1 1/2-story wood-frame structure, joined at the southwest corner to a south-facing 2 1/2-story structure, with a single-story ell extending further to the west. The taller main block has a gabled roof, central chimney, clapboard siding, and fieldstone foundation. The secondary structure is similarly finished. Both have five-bay facades and central entrances.

The main block was built about 1765 by Robert Reed, who proceeded to raise a family of twelve children. The 1 1/2-story Cape has an unknown construction date, but architectural evidence suggests it was built about the same time, and the two structures have been joined since the 18th century. In the 1930s it was acquired by Bowdoin College professor and poet Robert P. Tristram Coffin, who made reference to it in some of his writings.

== See also ==
- National Register of Historic Places listings in Sagadahoc County, Maine
