= Grey Havens Inn =

- U.S. National Register of Historic Places
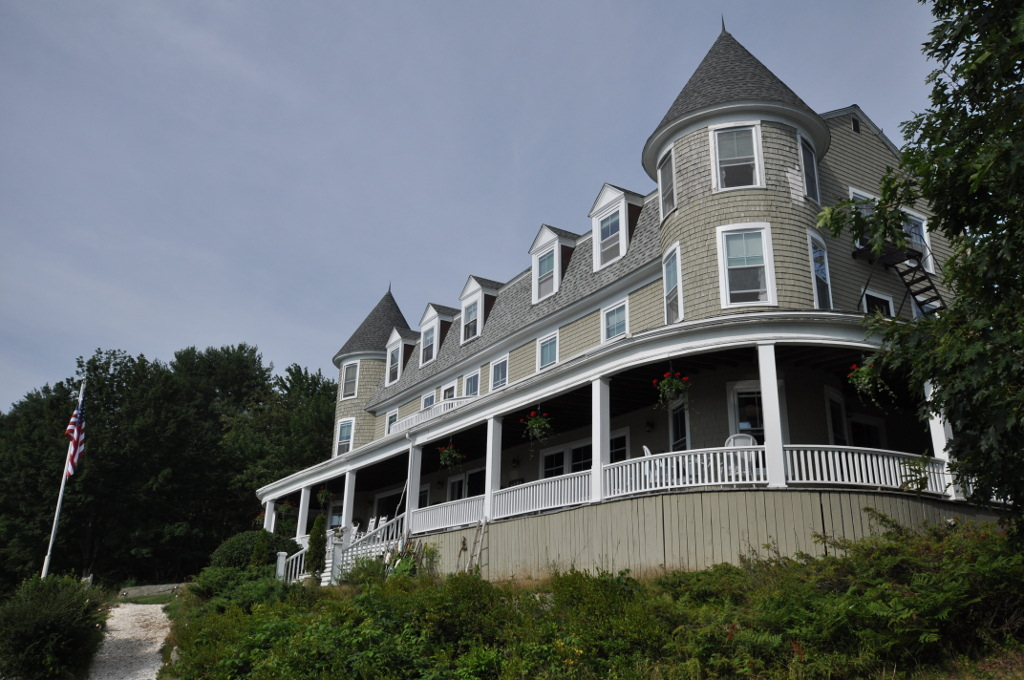

- Location within Maine Location within the United States
- Location: 96 Seguinland Rd., Georgetown, Maine
- Coordinates: 43°48′39″N 69°43′16″W
- Area: 1 acre (0.40 ha)
- Built: 1904
- Built by: Reid, Walter
- Architectural style: Shingle Style
- NRHP reference No.: 85000614
- Added to NRHP: March 21, 1985

The Grey Havens Inn is a historic hotel at 96 Seguinland Road in Georgetown, Maine. The inn was built in 1904, and is one of the finest surviving coastal hotels of the period in the state. It was listed on the National Register of Historic Places in 1985. Facilities include thirteen guest rooms, an onsite restaurant, docking facilities, and expansive views of Harmon's Harbor.

== Description and history ==
The Grey Havens Inn is located on the east side of Georgetown's eponymous island, near the mouth of Harmon's Harbor, an inlet off the Sheepscot River. It is situated on a rise, giving views of the harbor and the river beyond. It is a 2-1/2 story wood frame building, in the Shingle style. with its main facade oriented eastward toward the water. It has a gambrel roof pierced by gabled dormers, and a pair of three-story turrets, topped by conical roofs, at each of its front corners. A deep single-story porch extends across the front and around both sides. On the inland side, a gabled entry vestibule projects from the main block. The exterior is clad entirely in wooden shingles. The interior retains much of its original woodwork.

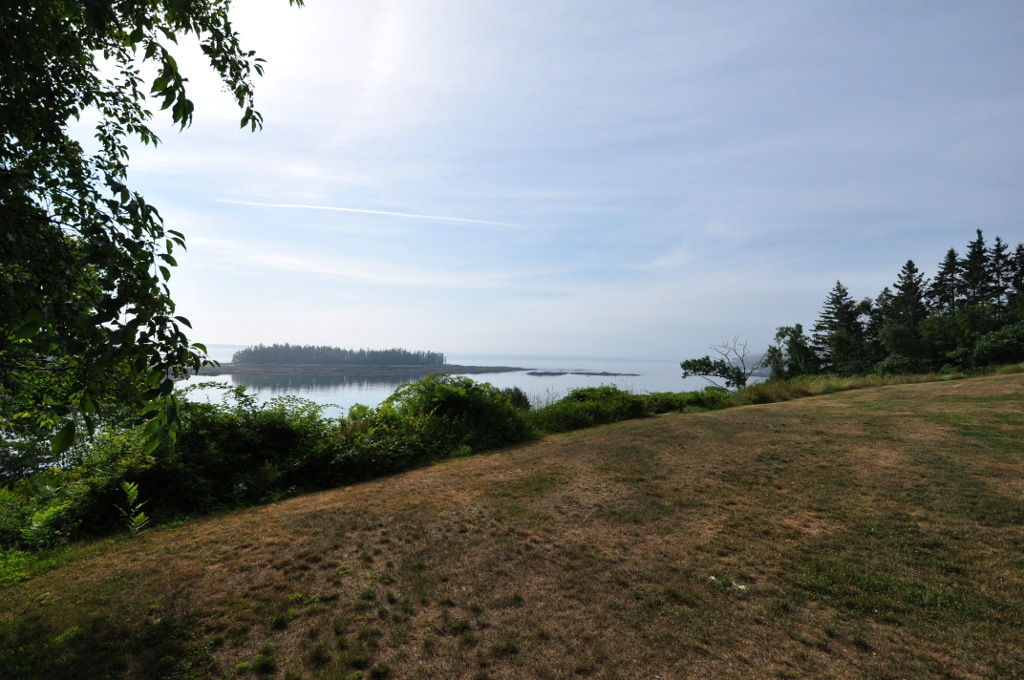
View from the inn

The inn was built in 1904 as a summer hotel, and is of a size and scale that was once a fairly common sight on Maine's coastline. The inn was built by Walter Reid, and was originally called "Seguinland". Reid is locally notable for giving land further south in Georgetown that is now Reid State Park. (Reid's family mansion, located nearby, is also now a bed and breakfast.)

== See also ==
- National Register of Historic Places listings in Sagadahoc County, Maine
