= Woolwich Town House =

- U.S. National Register of Historic Places
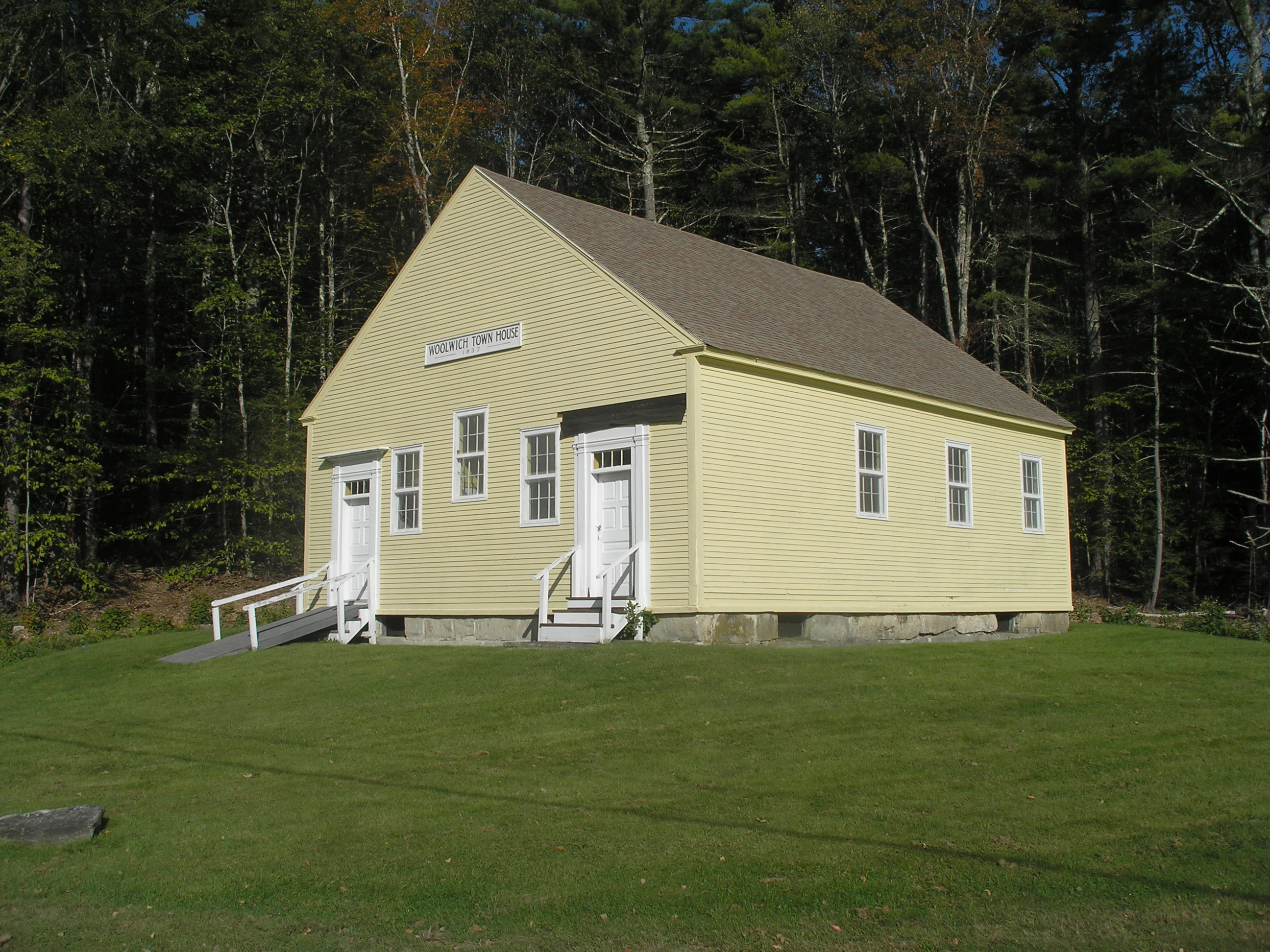

- Location within Maine
- Location: Old State and Dana Mills Rds., Woolwich, Maine
- Coordinates: 43°58′10″N 69°46′12″W
- Area: 0.5 acres (0.20 ha)
- Built: 1837
- Built by: Leonard, William D.
- NRHP reference No.: 78000199
- Added to NRHP: February 17, 1978

The Woolwich Town House is a historic government building at Old Stage and Dana Mills Roads in Woolwich, Maine. Built in 1837 with federal government surplus funds, it is a well-preserved early 19th-century town meeting house with basically vernacular style. It was listed on the National Register of Historic Places in 1978.

== Description and history ==
The Woolwich Town House stands in the central part of rural Woolwich, at the northwest corner of Old Stage Road and Dana Mills Road. It is a rectangular single-story wood frame structure, with a gable roof, clapboarded exterior, and granite foundation. Its main facade faces south toward Old Stage Road, is five bays wide, with entrances in the outer bays and sash windows in the center three bays. The center window is raised above the others, and the entrances are framed with simple Doric pilasters rising to an entablatured lintel. Similar sash windows are also used on the building sides. The interior retains well-preserved original period features.

The town house was built in 1837 by William D. Leonard, a local builder. It was funded by the town's portion of a federal government surplus, whose distribution to the states had been authorized by Congress in 1836. Maine had decided to distribute its share of the surplus to its incorporated communities by population, and the town of Woolwich voted to spend its share for the construction of this house. It is still owned and maintained by the town.

== See also ==
- National Register of Historic Places listings in Sagadahoc County, Maine
