= Cold Spring Farm (Phippsburg, Maine) =

Historic house in Maine, United States

- U.S. National Register of Historic Places
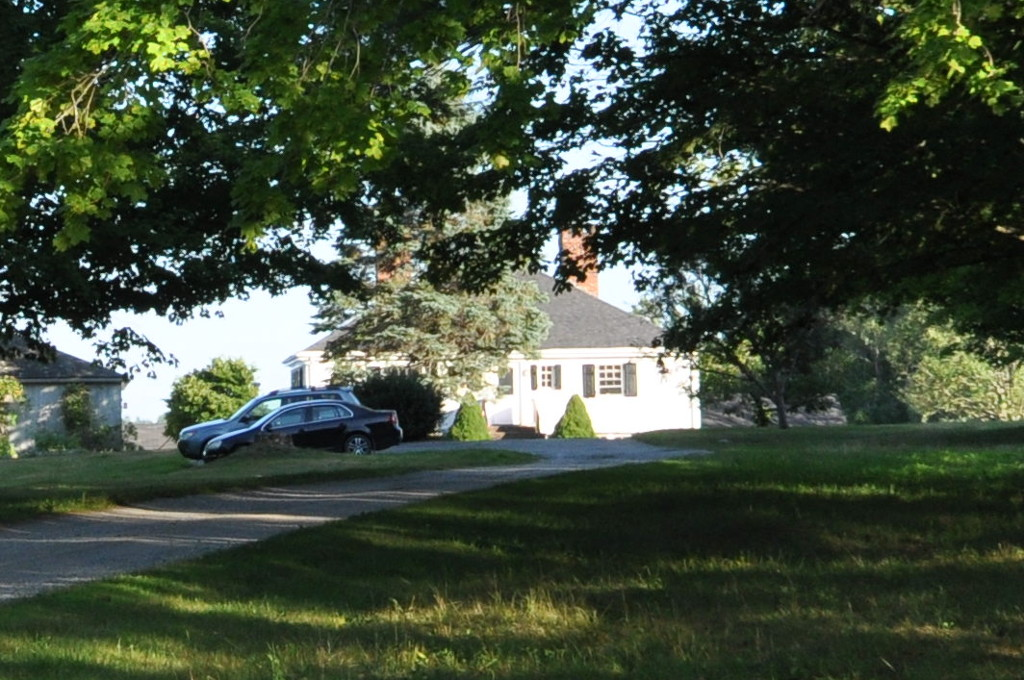

- Location within Maine Location within the United States
- Location: Cold Spring Farm Rd., Phippsburg, Maine
- Coordinates: 43°51′12″N 69°48′0″W
- Area: 1 acre (0.40 ha)
- Built: 1774
- Built by: Lee, William
- Architectural style: Georgian
- NRHP reference No.: 85000274
- Added to NRHP: February 14, 1985

Cold Spring Farm is a historic house on Cold Spring Farm Road in Phippsburg, Maine. Built in 1774 by a Loyalist refugee from Boston, it is a fine and well-preserved example of Georgian architecture in brick. It was listed on the National Register of Historic Places in 1985.

== Description and history ==
Cold Spring Farm is located on the western bank of the Kennebec River in northern Phippsburg, at a point opposite Arrowsic Island where the river narrows. It is accessed by road from Maine State Route 209 by Fiddler's Reach Road and Old Ferry Road. It is a two-story brick structure, with a tall hip roof and two interior chimneys. Oriented facing roughly south towards the river, its north side is built partly into a slope, revealing only the top 1 1/2 stories on the north side. Its exterior is quite plain, with sash windows in rectangular openings, and a central entrance flanked by sidelight windows. The main block is flanked by small single-story ells to the east and west. The interior retains period woodwork and finishes, including fireplace mantels, doors and wainscoting. The central stairway underwent some alterations in the 19th century.

The house was built in 1774 by William Lee, an Englishman who had settled in Boston, Massachusetts, but decided to leave the city that year following civil disturbances of the American Revolution. Lee was from a family of brickmakers, and fashioned the bricks for the house from clay found on the banks of a stream just north of the house. The property is apparently named for a nearby spring, which does not freeze in the winter.

== See also ==
- National Register of Historic Places listings in Sagadahoc County, Maine
