= Charles H. Ingraham Cottage =

Historic house in Maine, United States

- U.S. National Register of Historic Places
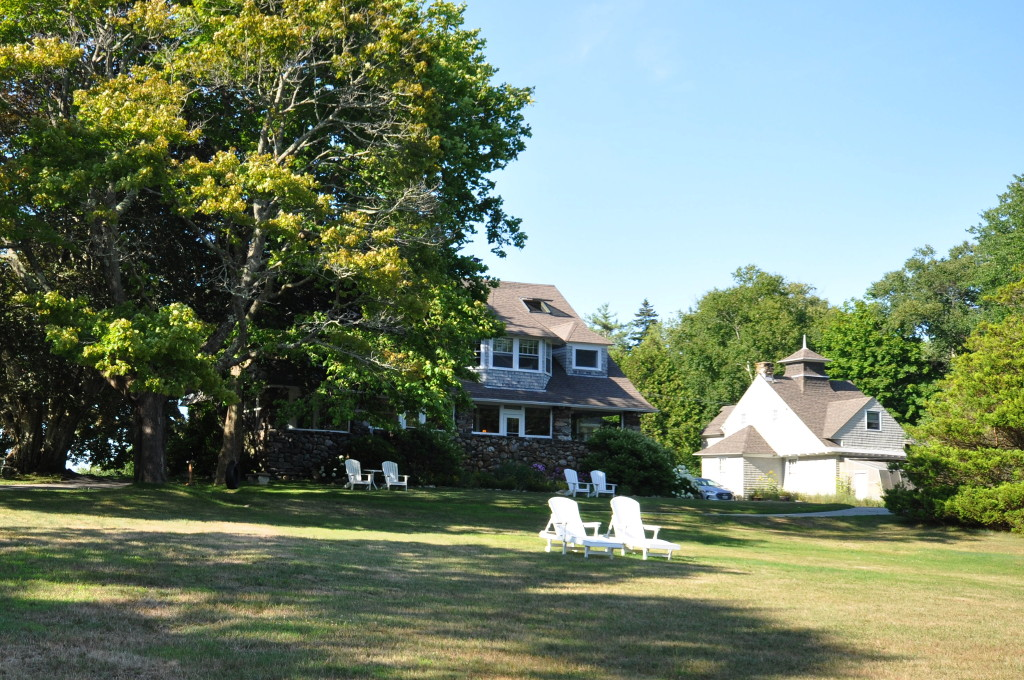

- Location within Maine Location within the United States
- Location: 907 Popham Rd., Phippsburg, Maine
- Coordinates: 43°44′53″N 69°47′17″W
- Area: less than one acre
- Built: 1897
- Architect: Howard K. Hilton
- Architectural style: Shingle Style
- NRHP reference No.: 86003512
- Added to NRHP: December 29, 1986

The Charles H. Ingraham House is a historic house at 907 Popham Road in Phippsburg, Maine. Built in 1897, it is one of the finest Shingle style houses in Phippsburg, and is Maine's only known design by Providence, Rhode Island architect Howard K. Hilton. The house is now known as Stonehouse Manor, a bed and breakfast inn.

== Description and history ==
The Ingraham House is located in southernmost Phippsburg, sandwiched on a rural parcel between a wooded section of northern Popham Beach State Park and Fort Baldwin Memorial Park. It is a 2 1/2-story wood-frame structure, with a gabled roof extending over the top 1 1/2 stories, and extending over a front porch featured a fieldstone skirt and posts. The roofline is punctured by a variety of dormers, in different sizes and roof treatments. The interior retains original high-quality woodwork and leaded windows, with bedroom fireplaces featuring unique custom tilework in a vaguely Moorish theme. Its main entrance and staircase are stylistically reminiscent of interior designs of H.H. Richardson.

The house was built in 1897 for Charles H. Ingraham, a banker from Providence, Rhode Island. Designed by Providence architect Howard K. Hilton, who was best known for his work in Rhode Island and Massachusetts, it is the only known design of his in Maine. Ingraham had apparently harbored hopes that a fashionable summer colony would develop around his property and an adjacent hotel (now demolished). However, in 1905 the US Army began construction of Fort Baldwin, a new coastal defense fort to protect Portland, Maine. When the gun batteries positioned less than 700 feet away were fired, the concussion caused thousands of dollars' worth of damage to the property.

Since 1996 it has been operated as a bed and breakfast inn.

== See also ==
- National Register of Historic Places listings in Sagadahoc County, Maine
