= William T. Donnell House =

Historic house in Maine, United States

- U.S. National Register of Historic Places
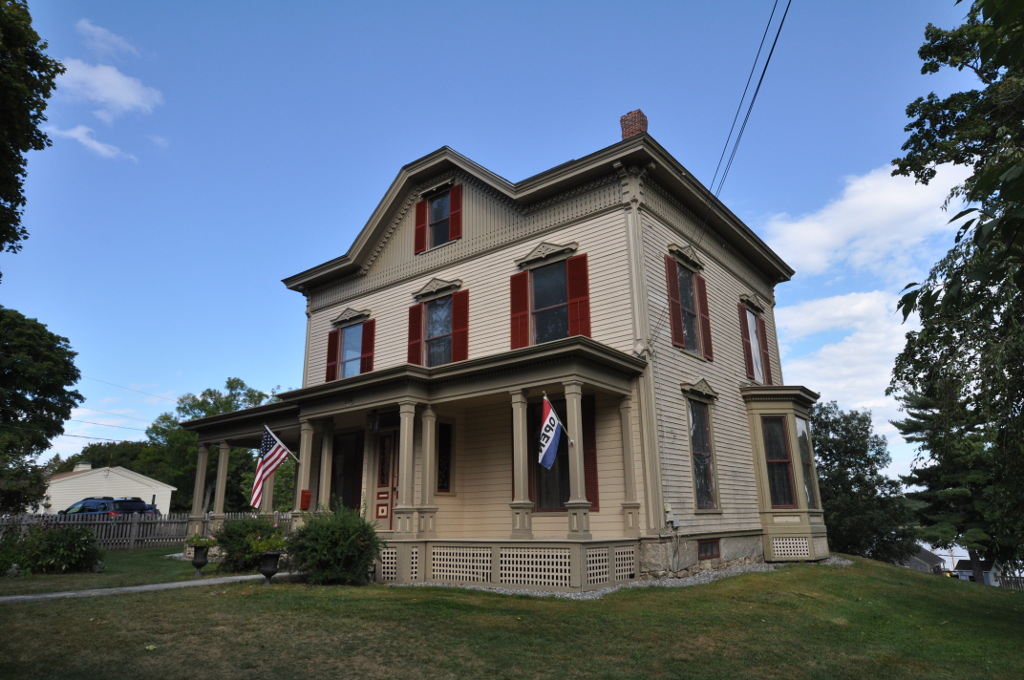

- Location within Maine Location within the United States
- Location: 279 Washington St. (Maine Maritime Museum, Bath, Maine
- Coordinates: 43°53′42″N 69°49′3″W
- Area: less than one acre
- Built: 1868
- Architectural style: Italianate
- NRHP reference No.: 89000840
- Added to NRHP: July 13, 1989

The William T. Donnell House is a historic house museum, part of the Maine Maritime Museum on Washington Street in Bath, Maine. It was built in 1868 for one of the city's leading shipbuilders of the late 19th century, and has remained relatively unaltered since his occupancy. It was listed on the National Register of Historic Places in 1989.

== Description and history ==
The Donnell House stands on the east side of Washington Street, at roughly the northwestern corner of the campus of the Maine Maritime Museum, the former Percy and Small Shipyard. The house is a 2 1/2-story wood-frame structure, with a hip roof and a combination of clapboard and shiplap siding. The front (street-facing) facade is three bays wide, with a clipped-gable dormer at the center, and a single-story porch extending across the front, supported by square posts set on paneled blocks. Windows are topped by decorative hoods, and the roofline is bracketed and dentillated. The interior is reflective of a late 19th-century remodeling.

The house was most likely built in 1868, one year after the property was purchased (without house) by William T. Donnell. Donnell was a shipwright who married Clara Hitchcock, the daughter of Henry Hitchcock, owner of the shipyard located northeast of the house. That shipyard, which Donnell came to own, was one of the most active of Bath's shipyards in the 1870s and 1880s, producing more than 20 schooners in the years between 1866 and 1901. Donnell also owned and operated some of those ships as a merchant, and served in the state legislature. He sold the land that eventually became the Percy & Small Shipyard, founded in 1896. His house was acquired by the Maine Maritime Museum in 1974, and restored to its late 19th-century appearance. Its interior is viewable with museum admission.

== See also ==
- National Register of Historic Places listings in Sagadahoc County, Maine
