= Trufant Historic District =

Historic district in Maine, United States

- U.S. National Register of Historic Places
- U.S. Historic district
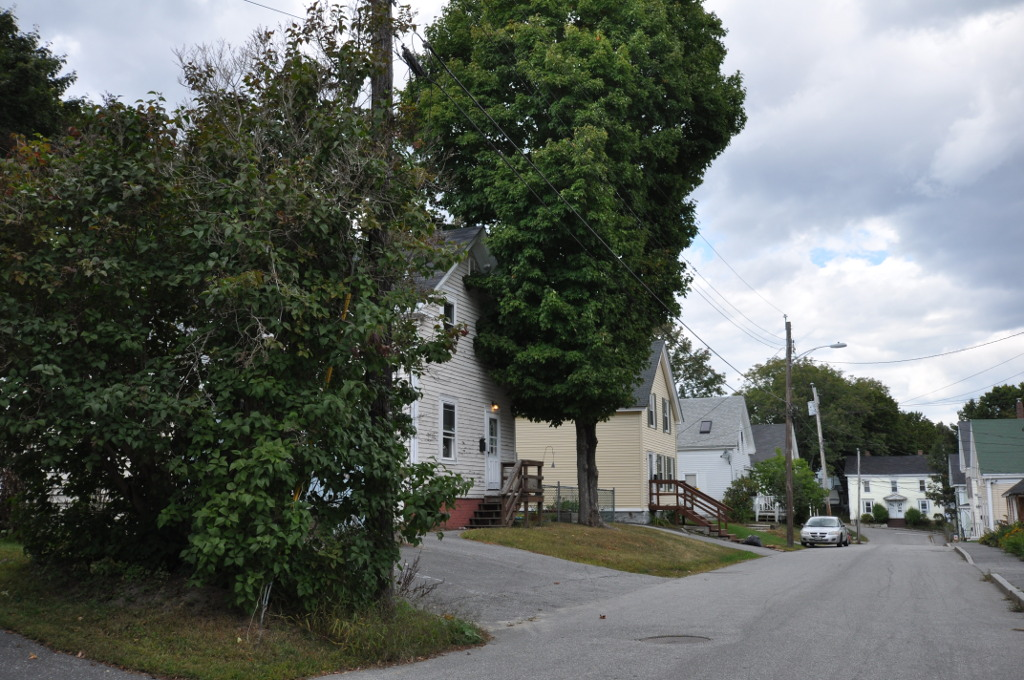

- Location within Maine Location within the United States
- Location: Portions of Corliss, Highland, Middle, Pine and Washington Sts., Bath, Maine
- Coordinates: 43°54′2″N 69°49′5″W
- Area: 10 acres (4.0 ha)
- Built: 1828
- Architectural style: Greek Revival, Italianate, et al.
- NRHP reference No.: 03001402
- Added to NRHP: January 15, 2004

The Trufant Historic District encompasses a concentration of 19th-century middle-class residential housing on the south side of Bath, Maine. This area was most heavily developed during Bath's heyday as a major shipbuilding center, and includes numerous examples of Greek Revival and Italianate styling. It was listed on the National Register of Historic Places in 2004.

== Description and history ==
The city of Bath, located on the west bank of the Kennebec River on the coast of southern Maine, was incorporated as a town in 1781. It grew in the 19th century to become a major center for the construction of wooden sailing ships, with the river bank lined with shipyards. Residential areas developed on the hillsides above the yards. Part of the area south of the downtown was originally a farm owned by the Trufant family, whose progenitor moved to the area in 1745. The family holdings had been divided and in part sold off by the late 1820s, but had not yet been significantly developed. With the city's economy booming in the 1840s, development began to take place in the area bounded by Pine, Middle, Corliss, and Washington Streets, a portion of the former Trufant farm. Middle and Highland Streets were laid out in the early 1850s, and rapidly developed with a series of modest Greek Revival houses. Infill construction, and the development of vacant lots resulted in the addition of Italianate houses in the 1860s and 1870s. By the early 20th century, the area had substantially achieved its present appearance.

The historic district is bounded on the east by Washington Street, between Pine and Corliss Streets, and includes only buildings on the road's west side. It extends up Pine to Clifton Street, and up Corliss to Middle Street, and includes buildings on both sides of those streets, as well as Highland Street, which runs parallel between Washington and Middle. There are 60 buildings in the district, about half of which are Greek Revival, and 13 that are Italianate. There are only two 20th-century houses in the area, and most of the buildings have retained original decorative features, in some cases despite the application of modern siding.

== See also ==
- National Register of Historic Places listings in Sagadahoc County, Maine
