= Cathance Water Tower =

- U.S. National Register of Historic Places
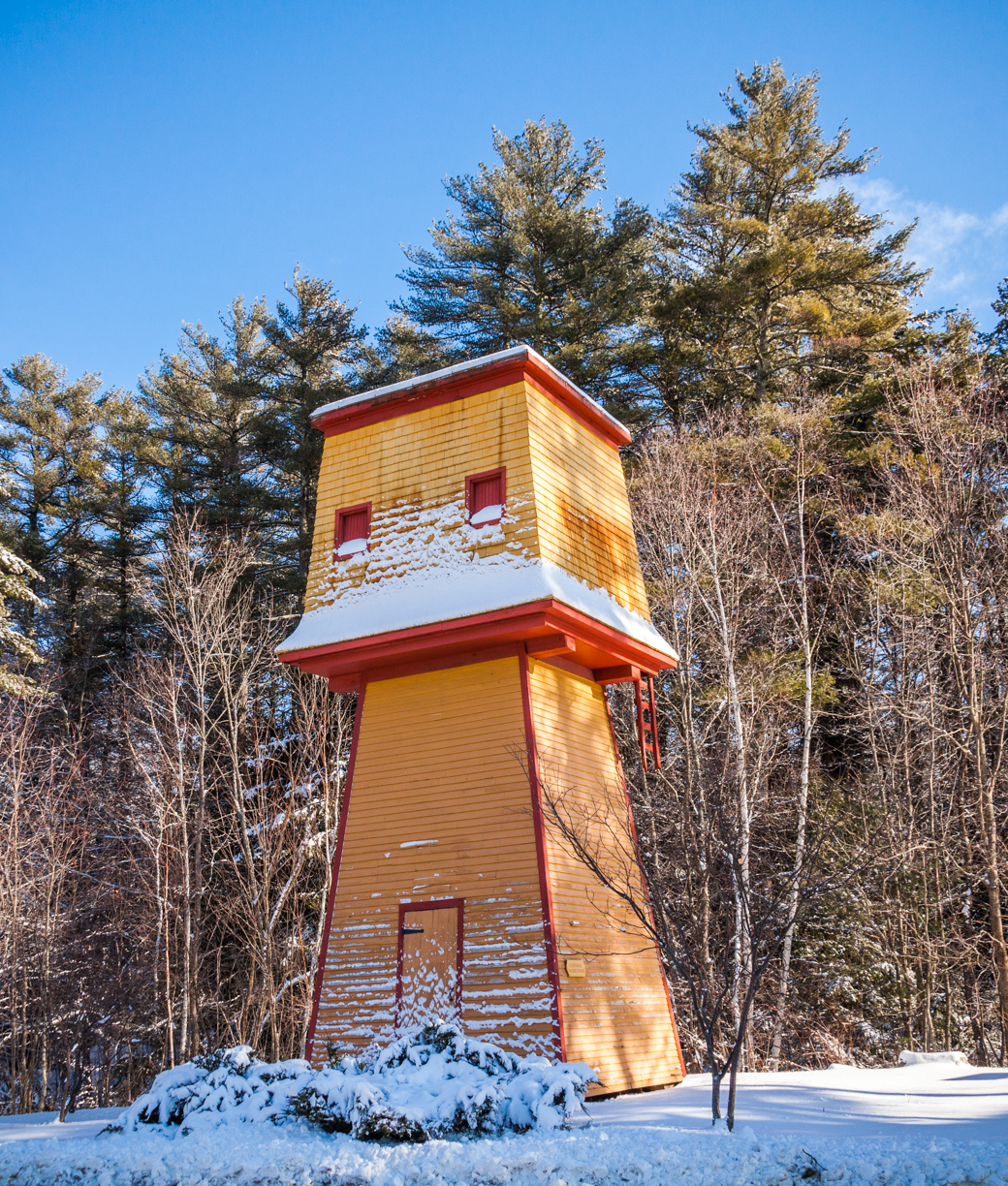

- Location within Maine Location within the United States
- Location: Cathance Rd. at Beechwood Dr., Topsham, Maine
- Coordinates: 43°57′6″N 69°55′50″W
- Area: less than one acre
- Built: 1875
- NRHP reference No.: 00001637
- Added to NRHP: January 22, 2001

The Cathance Water Tower is a historic water tower at Cathance Road and Beechwood Drive in Topsham, Maine. Probably built in the late 19th century, it is an extremely rare surviving example of a residential wooden water tower built for a single residence. It was listed on the National Register of Historic Places in 2001. It is now owned by the town.

== Description and history ==
The Cathance Water Tower is located in a rural residential area of eastern Topsham, just east of the junction of Cathance Road and Beechwood Drive. It is a square wooden structure, about 30 feet (9.1 m) tall, with a base section that has slightly sloping walls finished in clapboards, and a wider top section finished in wooden shingles. It is topped by a hipped corrugated metal roof. There are two doors in the base and one window. One of the doors provides access to the inside stairwell, while the other provides access to a chamber where equipment for pumping water was housed. The upper section, which hangs over the lower one by 2–3 feet (0.61–0.91 m), houses a wooden tank with a capacity of about 5,000 US gallons (19,000 L).

The tower's construction date is uncertain, but has been reported as standing at this site since roughly the turn of the 20th century. It was probably built to supply water to the Rogers family farmstead, a 1770s farm property. The rest of the farm complex was destroyed by fire in 1978, and most of the farm was developed residentially afterward. The tower's tank was originally supplied by water from a nearby stream via a hydraulic ram, which was later replaced by an electrical pump. The town, which owns the tower and surrounding land, had hoped to recreate the original working mechanism.

== See also ==
- National Register of Historic Places listings in Sagadahoc County, Maine
