= Ropes End =

Historic house in Maine, United States

- U.S. National Register of Historic Places
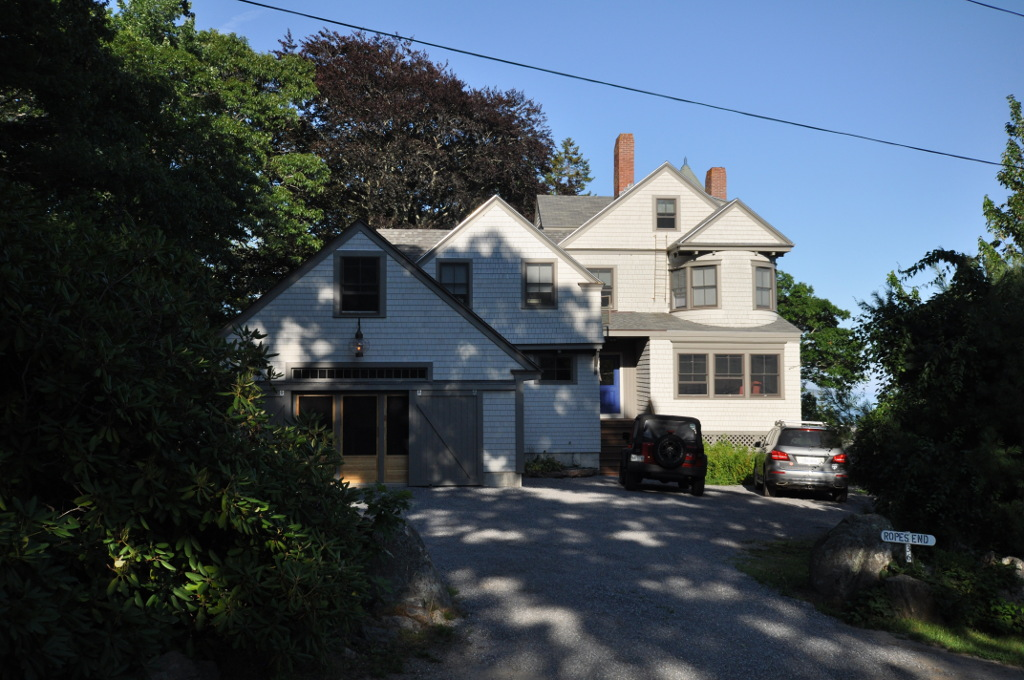

- Location within Maine Location within the United States
- Location: 36 Hyde Rd., Phippsburg, Maine
- Coordinates: 43°43′24″N 69°50′12″W
- Area: 0.6 acres (0.24 ha)
- Built: 1898
- Architectural style: Shingle Style
- NRHP reference No.: 01001421
- Added to NRHP: December 31, 2001

Ropes End is a historic summer house at 36 Hyde Road in Phippsburg, Maine. Built c. 1898, it is a fine local example of Shingle style architecture, built as part of a small summer colony developed by Joseph R. Bodwell. The house was listed on the National Register of Historic Places in 2001.

== Description and history ==
Ropes End stands on the east side of Hyde Road, near its end, in the Small Point area of far southern Phippsburg. It is a rambling three-story wood-frame structure, with a shingled exterior and a fieldstone foundation. It has a central rectangular mass, covered by a gabled roof, from which there are several projections. The most prominent of these is a polygonal tower at the southeast corner, which is topped by a pyramidal turret. From this, a shed-roof porch wraps around the east side, joining to a set of ells on the north side that include a garage at the northwest corner.

The area on the east side of Cape Small Point was owned by members of the Lowell family as farmland for much of the 19th century. In 1885 Abner Lowell sold his farm to Joseph R. Bodwell, who proceeded to subdivide the area for development as a summer colony, hoping to replicate the success of similar development at Bar Harbor. Lots were primarily purchased by people from Bath; this house was built for William and Mary Reed of Boston, Massachusetts. Reed was a founding member of the Small Point Club, the social center of the colony. The property name derives from one of its 20th century owners, the Ropes family of Minneapolis, Minnesota.

== See also ==
- National Register of Historic Places listings in Sagadahoc County, Maine
