= Wallace-Haskell Homestead =

Historic house in Maine, United States

- U.S. National Register of Historic Places
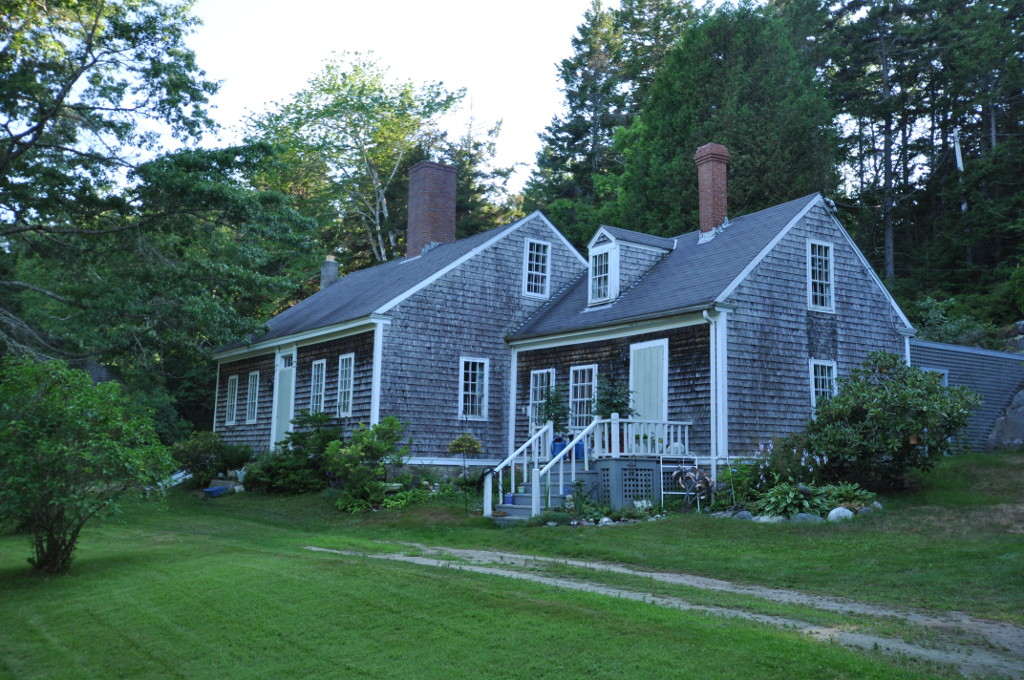

- Location within Maine Location within the United States
- Location: 268 W. Point Rd., Phippsburg, Maine
- Coordinates: 43°45′5″N 69°51′32″W
- Built: 1810
- NRHP reference No.: 100000526
- Added to NRHP: January 17, 2017

The Wallace-Haskell Homestead is a historic house at 268 West Point Road in Phippsburg, Maine. The house, a 1 1/2-story Cape, was the summer home of artist Ernest Haskell from 1906 until his death in 1925. It was originally built by William Wallace in 1810. The property was later run as a summer camp by Ernest's wife, and sheltered British children in the early years of World War II. The property was listed on the National Register of Historic Places in 2017.

== See also ==
- National Register of Historic Places listings in Sagadahoc County, Maine
