= Randall-Hildreth House =

Historic house in Maine, United States

- U.S. National Register of Historic Places
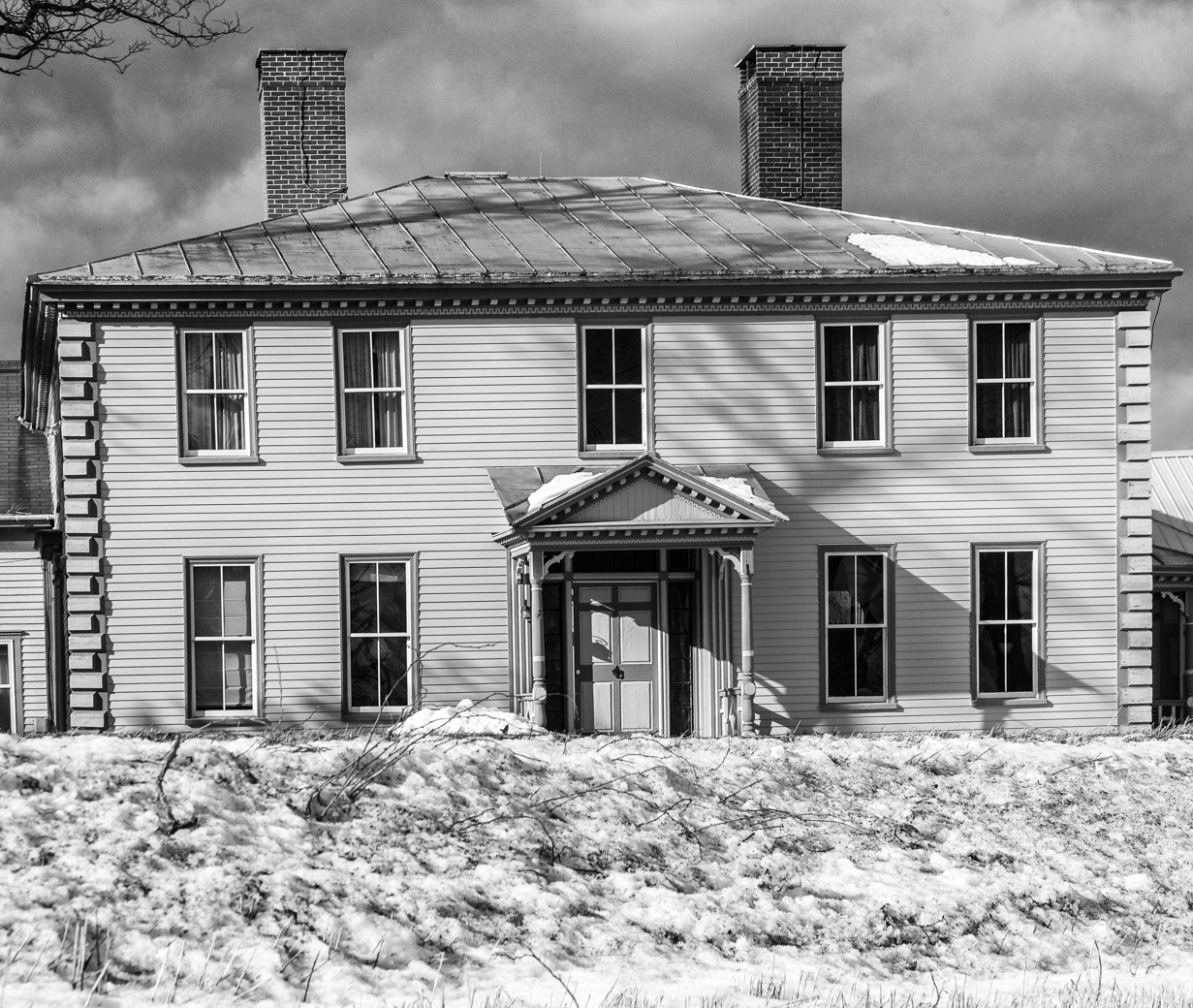
- 2016 photo

- Location within Maine Location within the United States
- Location: 806 Foreside Rd., Topsham, Maine
- Coordinates: 43°56′58″N 69°53′42″W
- Area: 3 acres (1.2 ha)
- Built: 1800
- Architectural style: Federal, Greek Revival, et al.
- NRHP reference No.: 04001048
- Added to NRHP: September 22, 2004

The Randall-Hildreth House is a historic house at 806 Foreside Road in Topsham, Maine. Built in 1800, it is a fine local example of a Federal period mansion house with Georgian and Greek Revival features. It was owned by the same family for nearly 200 years, and was listed on the National Register of Historic Places in 2004.

== Description and history ==
The Randall-Hildreth House stands in a rural area east of the Topsham village, set on the west side of Foreside Road, close to its junction with Pleasant Point Road. It is a two-story wood-frame structure, with a hip roof, twin interior chimneys, clapboard siding, and a granite foundation. The house is set at the edge of a terrace, exposing the basement wall at the rear. The main facade faces southeast, and is five bays wide, with the center entrance, flanked by sidelight windows and pilasters, and sheltered by an eclectically styled Victorian porch. A secondary entrance is set on the northeast side, sheltered by a screened porch with similar Victorian features. Ells are attached to both rear corners. The interior exhibits a combination of mainly Georgian and Federal features, including a fine central staircase and hall. One of the house's most unusual features is its original kitchen, a finished space located in the basement, underneath the dining room, to which it is connected by a staircase. This arrangement is extremely rare in the state.

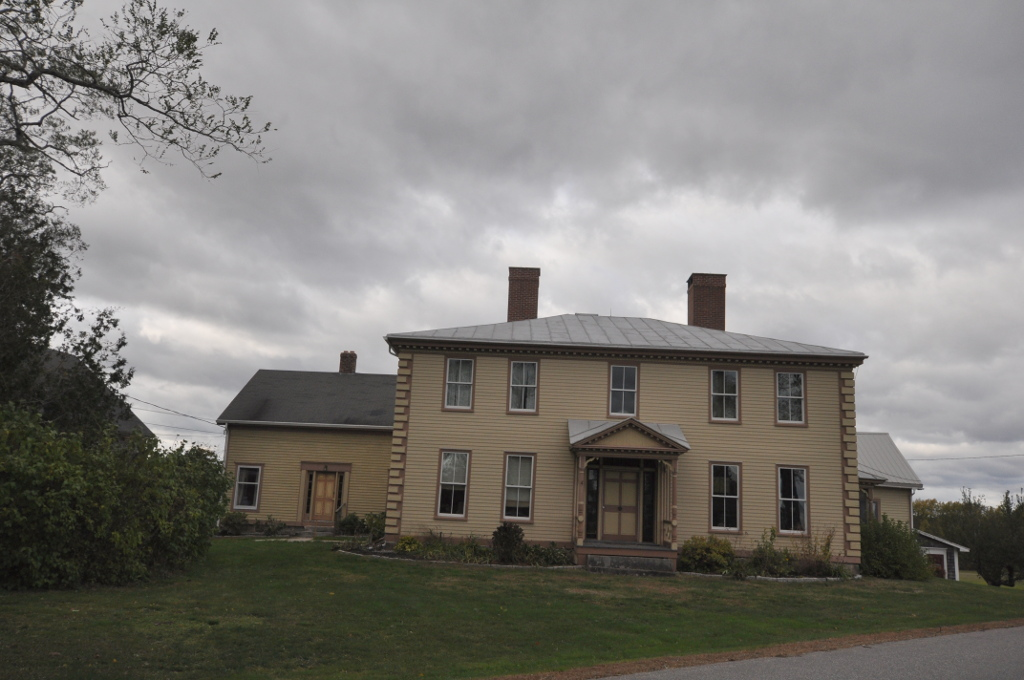
2019 photo

The house was built about 1800 by William Randall, who was one of Topsham's second wave of settlers, arriving in 1766. It is possible that this house incorporates parts of his first house. Randall was a man of means, who occupied a prominent position in local affairs. Randall came from Scituate, Massachusetts, and there is circumstantial evidence that the builder of the house may have been Samuel Melcher, another Scituate emigree. The house was owned by Randall's descendants (later the Hildreths) for 196 years.

== See also ==
- National Register of Historic Places listings in Sagadahoc County, Maine
