= Small Point Club =

- U.S. National Register of Historic Places
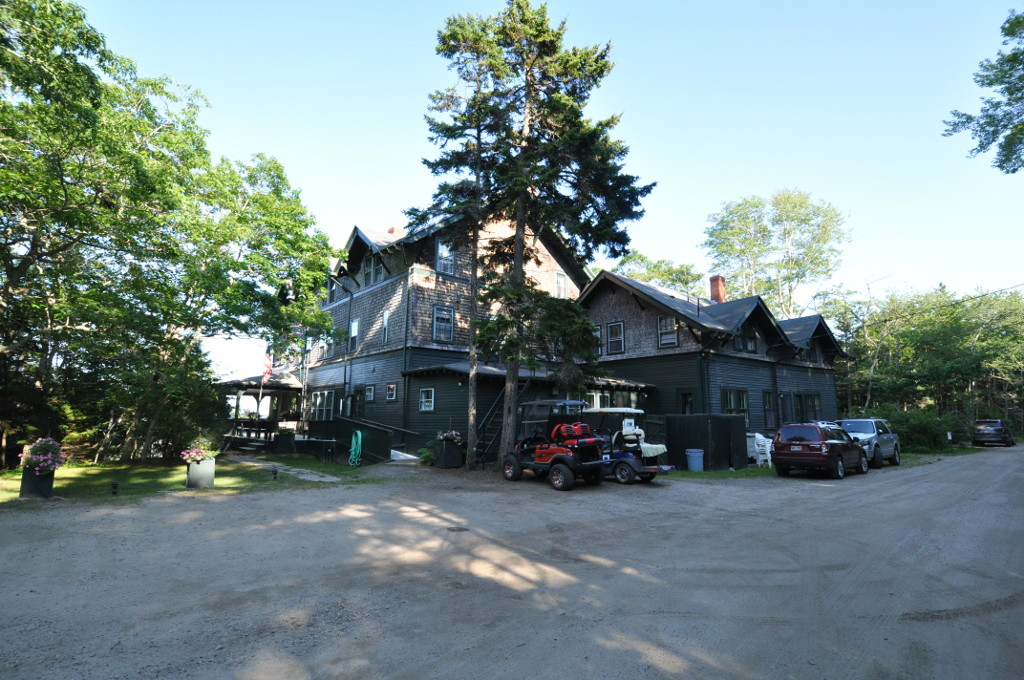

- Location within Maine Location within the United States
- Location: 64 Club Road, Phippbsburg, Maine
- Coordinates: 43°43′16″N 69°50′14″W
- Area: less than one acre
- Built: 1896
- Architect: Neal, Joseph L.
- Architectural style: Late Victorian
- NRHP reference No.: 99000376
- Added to NRHP: March 25, 1999

The Small Point Club is a historic private social club at 64 Club Road in the Small Point area of Phippsburg, Maine. Built in 1896 as part of a summer development started by Joseph Homan Manley, it is a fine local example of Victorian Stick and Shingle style architecture, designed by Maine native Joseph L. Neal. It was listed on the National Register of Historic Places in 1999.

== Description and history ==
The Small Point Club is located near the end of Club Road, a spur road leading to the shore on the Small Point peninsula, the southernmost tip of Phippsburg. It is set on the east side of the road and overlooks the Gulf of Maine. It is a three-story wood-frame structure, with its main block oriented east–west, and a secondary two-story service wing attached to the southwest corner, oriented north–south. Its sections are covered by gabled roofs, with cross-gables on the eaves supported by large brackets. The exterior is clad in patterned wooden shingles, and a single-story covered porch wraps around the north, east, and south sides of the eastern half of the building. The first floor is dedicated to public spaces (a large living room area to the east), with bedrooms on the upper floors.

The club, founded in 1895, was the brainchild of several prominent summer residents of the small summer colony developed by Joseph Homan Manley. Early members of the club included (in addition to Manley) Arthur Sewall, the 1896 Democratic candidate for Vice President of the United States. The club was conceived of as a place "for our mutual social intercourse". The clubhouse was designed by Wiscasset native Joseph L. Neal, and was built in 1895; it is one of his few known commissions in Maine. His original design called for a more elaborate Stick style exterior.

== See also ==
- National Register of Historic Places listings in Sagadahoc County, Maine
