= Harward Family House =

Historic house in Maine, United States

- U.S. National Register of Historic Places
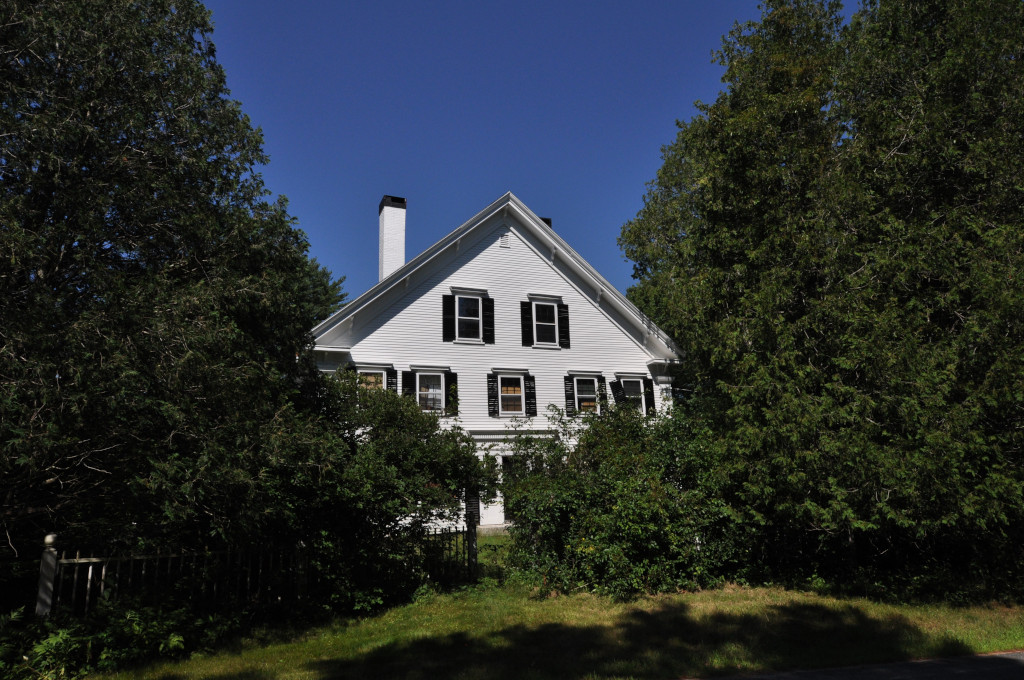

- Location within Maine Location within the United States
- Location: Pork Point Rd., Bowdoinham, Maine
- Coordinates: 44°1′48″N 69°49′35″W
- Area: 11 acres (4.5 ha)
- Built: 1795
- Architectural style: Federal, Greek Revival, Italianate
- NRHP reference No.: 96001038
- Added to NRHP: September 27, 1996

The Harward Family House is a historic house on Pork Point Road in Bowdoinham, Maine. Built about 1795 and repeatedly enlarged and altered, it is historically significant as the home of Thomas Harward, whose family's local shipyard was one of the most important elements of Bowdoinham's economy until about 1870. The house was listed on the National Register of Historic Places in 1996.

== Description and history ==
The Harward Family House is located in northern Bowdoinham, on the west side of Pork Point Road, about 0.4 miles (0.64 km) south of its junction with Maine State Route 24. It is a 2 1/2-story wood-frame structure, connected via ells to a barn at the rear. The street-facing front is an unusual five-bay gabled facade, with a center entrance. The gable has Italianate brackets in the eaves, and Greek Revival returns. The building corners are pilastered, and the entrance features a Colonial Revival surround, with sidelight windows, pilasters, and a corniced entablature. The interior is finished in a blend of Federal, Greek Revival, and Colonial Revival styles, representing at least three different periods of construction and alteration.

The house was built about 1795 by Thomas Harward, a Bowdoinham native whose first ship was built c. 1790 on Swan Island, located opposite Pork Point in the Kennebec River. Harward built this house about 1795, and raised thirteen children. Thomas' son John inherited the house and the shipyard, which he managed during its height in the 1850s. It is around that time that he made alterations to the house, updating it to prevailing Greek Revival and Italianate taste. The Harward shipyard suffered financial reverses in the Panic of 1857, and closed in 1869. Although it was not as large as the shipyards of Bath and Richmond, it was a significant element in the local economy.

== See also ==
- National Register of Historic Places listings in Sagadahoc County, Maine
