= W.D. Crooker House =

Historic house in Maine, United States

- U.S. National Register of Historic Places
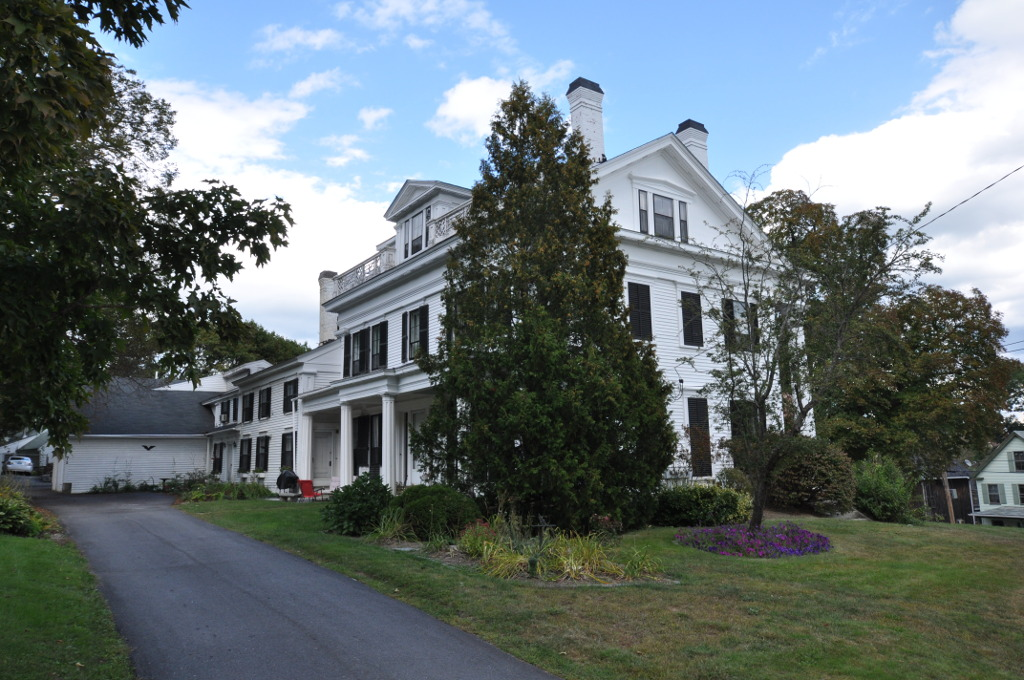
- W.D. Crooker House

- Location within Maine Location within the United States
- Location: 71 South Street, Bath, Maine
- Coordinates: 43°54′28″N 69°49′08″W
- Built: 1850
- Architect: Isaac D. Cole
- NRHP reference No.: 79000165
- Added to NRHP: July 10, 1979

The William Donnell Crooker House is an historic house at 71 South Street in Bath, Maine, United States. Built in 1850 by the prominent local builder and designer Isaac D. Cole, it is a distinctive example of late Greek Revival architecture. The Crooker family was involved with Bath's shipbuilding industry. The house was added to the National Register of Historic Places in July 1979.

== Description and history ==
The Crooker House stands at the northwest corner of South and Middle Streets, in what was in the mid-19th century a fashionable upland neighborhood on the Bath's south side. It is a 2 1/2-story wood-frame structure, with a gabled roof, clapboard siding, and ells extending the main block to the north side. The house is oriented facing east (toward Middle Street), and has a two-story colonnade of fluted Corinthian columns across its five-bay front facade. The main entrance is in the center bay, flanked by sidelight windows, and there is a glass door with flanking sidelights above it on the second floor, giving access to a wrought iron balcony. The main block is encircled by an entablature, and there are gabled dormers in both roof faces, featuring fully pedimented gables and three-part Palladian windows.

The house was built in 1850 by Isaac D. Cole, a prominent local builder and architect. The house is distinctive among high-style Greek Revival houses in Maine for the use of Corinthian columns, and for their placement on the roof side of the house instead of the gable. It was built for William D. Crooker, whose family was prominent in local businesses, operating a shipyard and merchant ships as well as lumber interests.

== See also ==
- National Register of Historic Places listings in Sagadahoc County, Maine
