= Purinton Family Farm =

- U.S. National Register of Historic Places
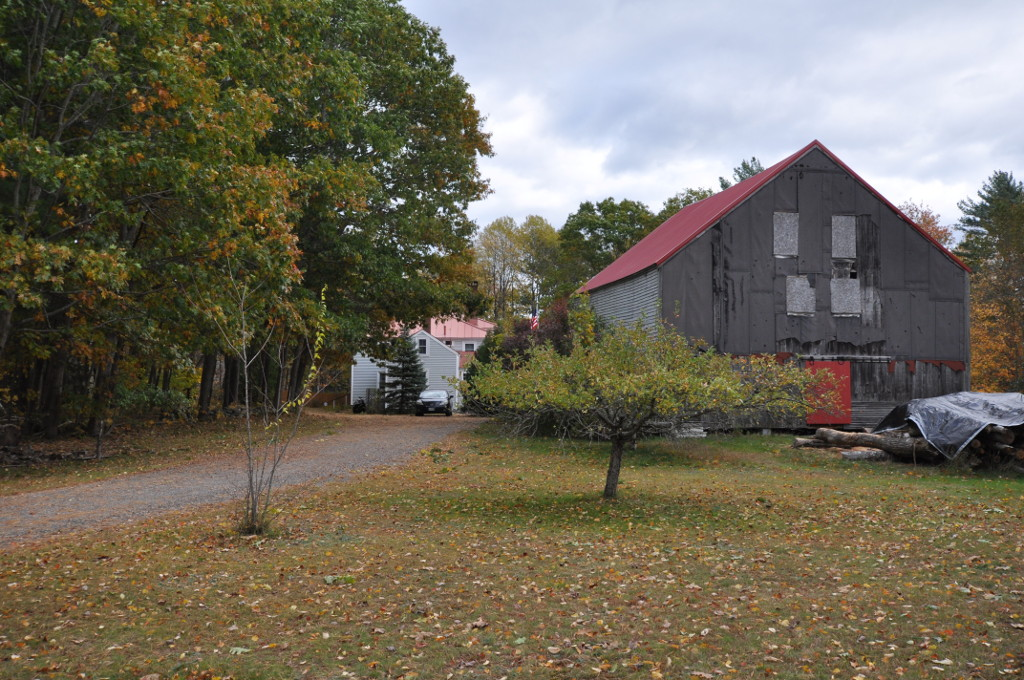

- Location within Maine Location within the United States
- Location: 65 Elm St., Topsham, Maine
- Coordinates: 43°55′27″N 69°57′5″W
- Area: 12 acres (4.9 ha)
- Built: 1810
- Architectural style: Federal
- NRHP reference No.: 89000842
- Added to NRHP: July 13, 1989

The Purinton Family Farm is a historic farmstead at 65 Elm Street in Topsham, Maine. Including three buildings dating to the late 18th and early 19th centuries, it is a rare surviving example in the state of an early 19th-century unconnected farm complex. The property also includes the archaeological remains of an earlier settler's house, as well as prehistoric artifacts. It was listed on the National Register of Historic Places in 1989.

== Description and history ==
The Purinton Family Farm occupies a property bounded on the south by the Androscoggin River, the west by the Brunswick-Topsham Bypass (Maine State Route 196), and the north by Elm Street (Maine State Route 24). Its eastern boundary is a gully separating the property from the Topsham Public Library and other properties. The farm includes three wood frame buildings: the main house, a barn, and a grain storage crib. The house is a Federal period 2-1/2 story structure, with a hip roof and a long single-story kitchen ell extending northwest from the main block. The barn stands west of the house, and the crib nearby. The crib is an unusual structure, framed out of heavy timbers that are not typical for buildings of its size, suggesting they were recycled from another building.

The property has a long history of occupation. One corner of the property, examined during an archaeological survey, exposed evidence of prehistoric occupation dating to the Susquehannah period (4000–3000 years ago). The property was first occupied by European settlers during the 1760s, when Robert Gore built what was described as some sort of fortified garrison house. This house was apparently demolished in the early 19th century, and a foundation suspected to belong to it was found during the archaeological work. In 1775 Gore sold the property to James Purinton. Purinton and his son Ezekiel were responsible for construction of the house, barn, and crib found on the property today. The property remained in the Purinton family until 1936.

== See also ==
- National Register of Historic Places listings in Sagadahoc County, Maine
