= Cornish House (Bowdoinham, Maine) =

Historic house in Maine, United States

- U.S. National Register of Historic Places
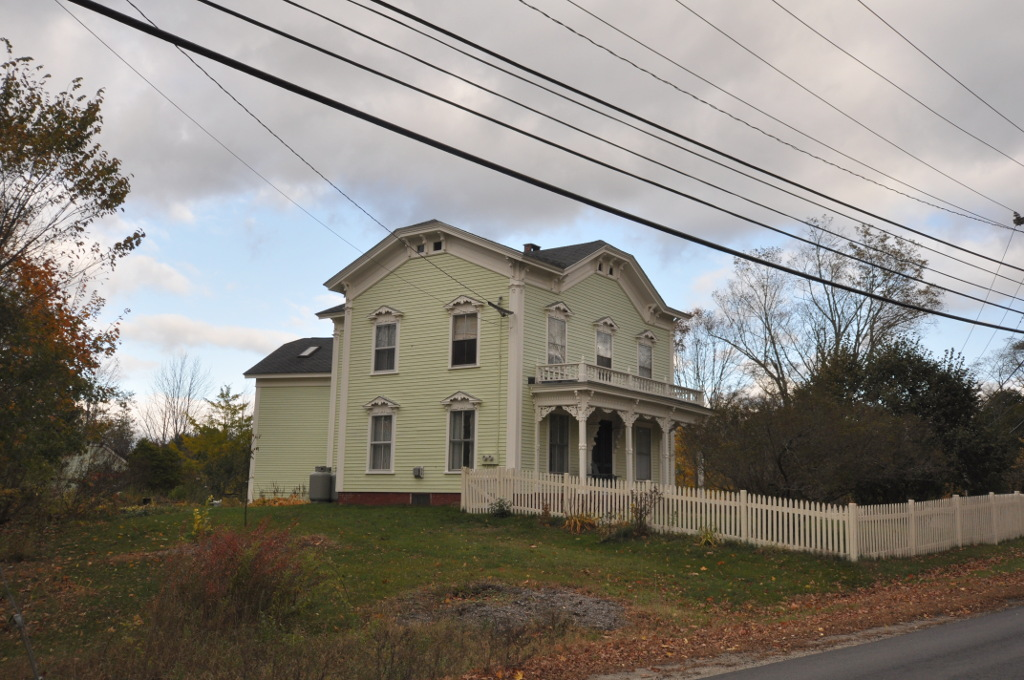

- Location within Maine Location within the United States
- Location: 87 Main St., Bowdoinham, Maine
- Coordinates: 44°0′34″N 69°54′8″W
- Area: 0.5 acres (0.20 ha)
- Built: 1885
- Architect: Curtis, George
- Architectural style: Italianate
- NRHP reference No.: 80000250
- Added to NRHP: January 15, 1980

The Cornish House is a historic house at 87 Main Street in Bowdoinham, Maine. Built in 1885, it is a distinctive late example of Italianate architecture, with gingerbread trim elements. It was listed on the National Register of Historic Places in 1980.

== Description and history ==
The Cornish House stands just west of the village center of Bowdoinham, on the north side of Main Street (Maine State Route 125), where it turns from a roughly east–west to north–south direction. It is a two-story wood-frame structure, with a cross-gable roof, clapboard siding, and brick foundation. The gables are broad, with clipped tops, and its cornices are elaborately bracketed, with bargeboard detailing. The windows of the house, and of the connected carriage barn, have similarly elaborate treatment, with gabled bargeboard lintels. The front facade is three bays wide, with a single story porch supported by turned posts with brackets, and a center entrance with double doors. A secondary entrance is on the right side, next to a two-story polygonal bay with bracketed cornices at each level.

The house was built in 1885, and represents an unusually late appearance of a generally Italianate style of decoration. It was probably designed by George Curtis, an architect from Bowdoin, for a Mr. Cornish. It underwent a full restoration in the early 1980s.

== See also ==
- National Register of Historic Places listings in Sagadahoc County, Maine
