= McCobb–Hill–Minott House =

Historic house in Maine, United States

- U.S. National Register of Historic Places
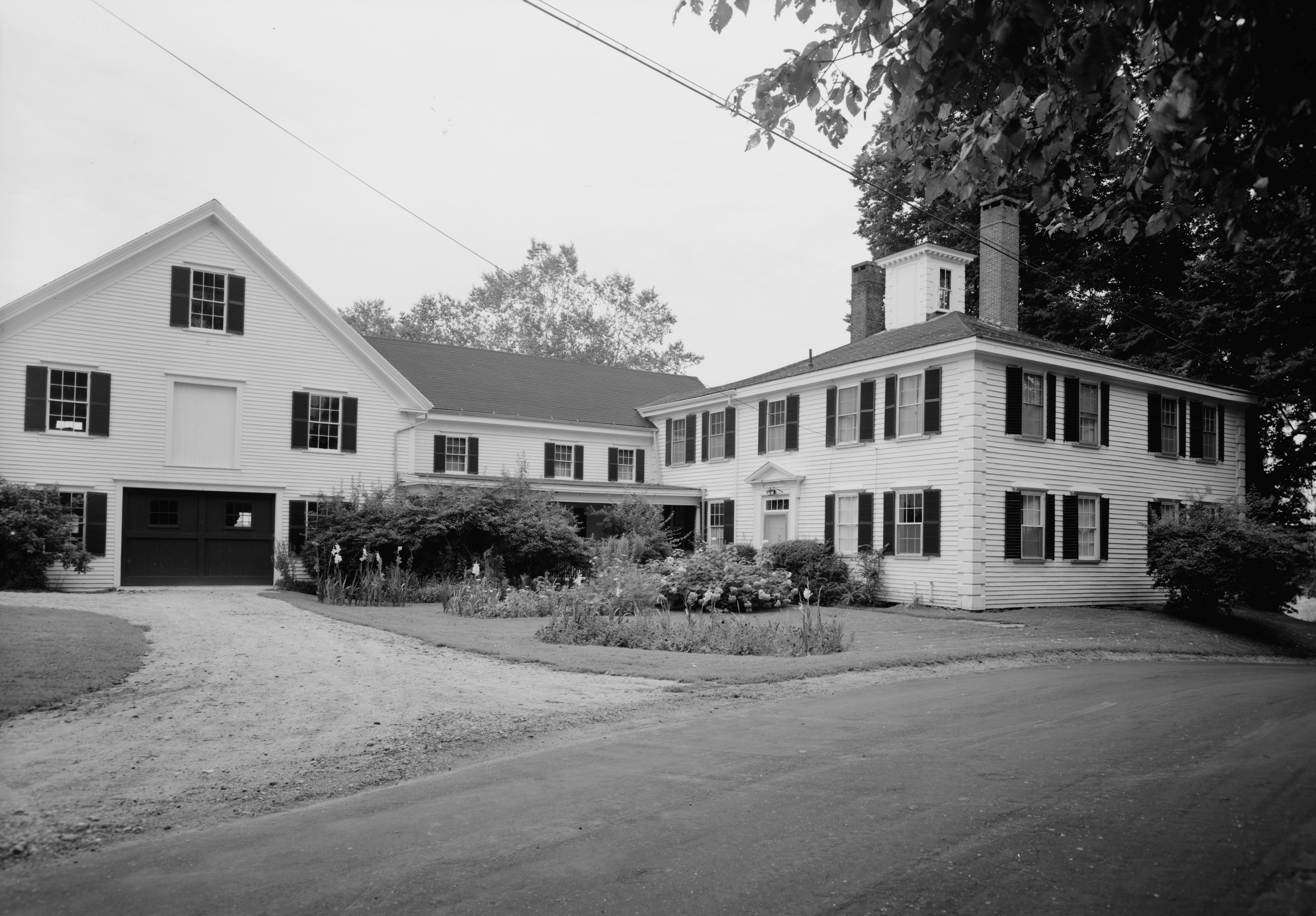
- HABS photo, 1962

- Location within Maine Location within the United States
- Location: 44 Parker Head Rd., Phippsburg, Maine
- Coordinates: 43°49′10″N 69°48′43″W
- Area: 1 acre (0.40 ha)
- Built: 1774
- Built by: Isaac Packard
- Architectural style: Georgian
- NRHP reference No.: 77000083
- Added to NRHP: November 23, 1977

The McCobb–Hill–Minott House is a historic house at 44 Parker Head Road in Phippsburg, Maine. Built in 1774, it is a high quality example of late Georgian architecture, notable for its architecture and its prominent residents, who included Mark Langdon Hill, Maine's first United States Congressman. The house is now the 1774 Inn, and was listed on the National Register of Historic Places in 1977.

== Description and history ==
The McCobb–Hill–Minott House is located in the central village of Phippsburg, on the north side of Parker Head Road, overlooking the Kennebec River to the east. It is a roughly square two-story wood-frame structure, with a hip roof, and clapboard siding. The roof has a large cupola at its center, covered by a low-pitch roof, with windows and three sides and a door on the fourth, providing access to the roof and chimneys. It has principal facades facing southeast and northwest, with center entrances framed by Doric pilasters and gabled pediments. A long ell extends northwest from the northeast face, joining the house to a barn; these additions date to the late 18th century.

The house was built by Isaac Packard in 1774 for James McCobb, a major landowner and local political leader during the American Revolution. One of McCobb's daughters married Mark Langdon Hill, who partnered with his brother-in-law Thomas McCobb in the establishment of a local shipyard and merchant business. Hill was politically active, serving as one Maine's first representatives in the United States Congress after it achieved statehood in 1820. After Hill's death, the house was purchased by Charles V. Minott, one of the region's most successful shipbuilders of the second half of the 19th century.

== See also ==
- National Register of Historic Places listings in Sagadahoc County, Maine
