= Stone Schoolhouse =

- U.S. National Register of Historic Places
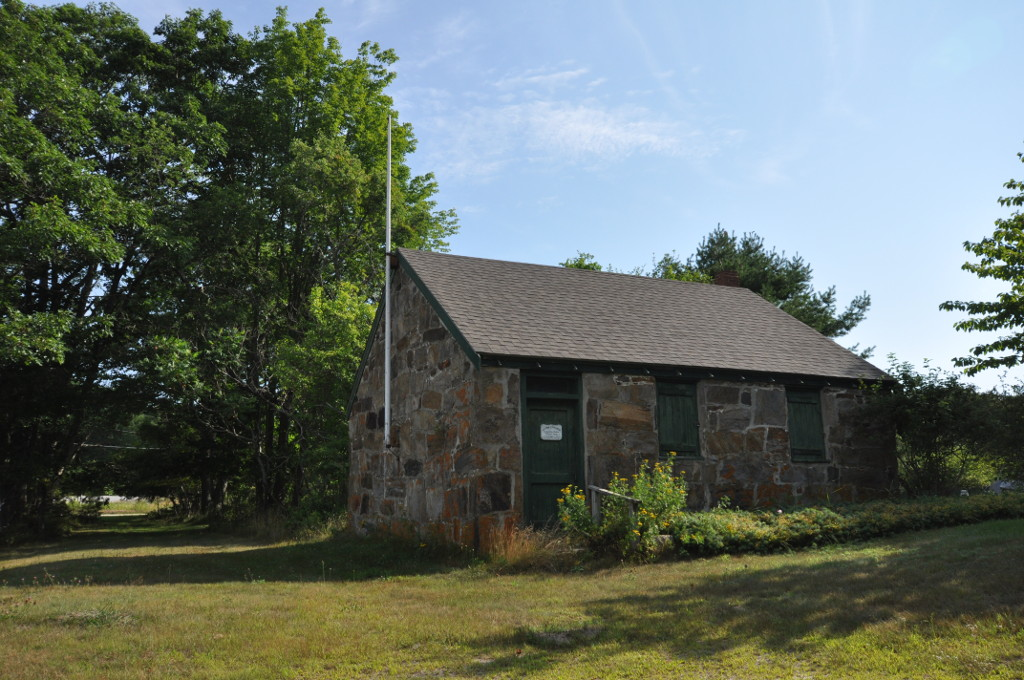

- Location within Maine Location within the United States
- Location: Bay Point Rd., Georgetown, Maine
- Coordinates: 43°46′45″N 69°45′54″W
- Area: 0.5 acres (0.20 ha)
- Built: before 1820
- NRHP reference No.: 77000085
- Added to NRHP: August 12, 1977

The Stone Schoolhouse is a historic school building on Bay Point Road in Georgetown, Maine. Built sometime before 1821, it is one of the state's small number of surviving stone district school buildings. It is now a museum property maintained by the local historical society. It was listed on the National Register of Historic Places in 1977.

== Description and history ==
The Stone Schoolhouse stands on the east side of Bay Point Road, in the southern part of Georgetown near the junction with Moffatt Lane. It is a modestly sized structure, built out of irregularly coursed ashlar fieldstone blocks, with a similar foundation. It has a gabled roof. The end walls are unadorned, while the side walls are three bays wide. The southern side has two sash windows to the right of the entrance, and the north side has two windows, set opposite those on the south side. A brick chimney is attached to one of the end walls.

The construction date of the school is unknown. It is documented to exist in town records of 1821, in which the purchase of a stove was considered for the building. Local history recounts that its construction was done by Irish immigrant stonemasons living on Long Island (offshore from Georgetown to the southwest), under the supervision of General Joseph Berry. The building now serves as a museum property of the Georgetown Historical Society.

== See also ==
- National Register of Historic Places listings in Sagadahoc County, Maine
