= James Davis (mariner) =

English ship captain and author

Captain James Davis
- Born: c. 1575; Kingdom of England
- Died: February 16, 1623 (aged 47–48); James City, Virginia Colony
- Other name: James Davies
- Occupations: Adventurer, sea captain
- Known for: Captain of the Virginia (of Northern Colony)
- Notable work: The Relation of a Voyage unto New England begun from the Lizard, ye first of June, 1607
- Spouse: Rachell Keyes (1580-1633)
- Children: Major Thomas Davis of Nansemond (b. 1595); James Davis II (b. 1599)

James Davis (b. c. 1575 – d. 1623) was an English ship captain and author. He was part of the expedition of the Virginia Company of Plymouth which established the short-lived Popham Colony, also called "Northern Virginia."

== Popham Colony ==
Davis was master of the ship Mary and John which sailed to the New World to the coast of Maine. He is believed to be the author of an account of this voyage entitled, The Relation of a Voyage into New England begun from the Lizard, ye first of June 1607. He was the commander of the fort built on the Kennebec River, August 19, 1607, by the Sagadahoc New England Colony (the colony was made up of knights and gentlemen from Bristol).

The short-lived colony built its fort and log buildings near present-day Phippsburg, Maine, in August 1607. The Virginia, a pinnace was also constructed to demonstrate shipbuilding potential of the new colony. When the Popham Colony closed in 1608 due to the severity of the winter, the Virginia was one of the vessels to carry the surviving colonists back to England, probably sailed by Davis.

== Jamestown Colony ==
Records suggest that Davis and Virginia made at least one other Atlantic crossing, from England to the more successful Jamestown Settlement, a project of the Virginia Company of London. Virginia was apparently one of the two pinnaces in tow behind one of the larger ships of the Third Supply mission to Jamestown, which left Plymouth in 1609. They encountered a 3-day storm thought to have been a hurricane, resulting in the shipwreck of the flagship of the fleet, the Sea Venture, on Bermuda.

Virginia survived the storm, and under the command of Davis (accompanied by his wife Rachel), arrived in the Colony on 3 October 1609. A possible brother, Robert, migrated to Virginia with Davis as well. At that time, Davis assumed command of Fort Algernon at Point Comfort, where he survived the Starving Time of 1609–10. Davis was a councilor for the north Virginia Colony.

Virginia become a safe refuge when Indian hostilities erupted. She was also used to go inland to relieve Fort Algernon and attempt trade with the Powhatan confederacy. During this trip, Davis decapitated two Indians and left their mutilated bodies near the fort. On yet another inland foray, he destroyed a Powhatan village, burnt their corn and killed all men, women and children. Davis was soon in command of three forts.

== Subsequent career ==
Mention of Davis continued. He is noted as commanding colonists at Henrico, Virginia in 1616. Most writers concur that Davis left his post in charge of the forts at Coxendale, near the present fort site of Henricus, and sailed for England aboard the ship Treasurer, commanded by Samuel Argall in 1616. It is noteworthy that John Rolfe and Pocahontas were also aboard. It is likely that he returned to Virginia in 1617 aboard the George; this is suggested by the fact that his son Thomas Davis was deeded land in Virginia some years later for head rights accrued for two indentured servants whose passage he paid for on the George that year.

== Death ==
James Davis died on February 1623/24 (O.S./N.S.) at his plantation in Henrico, Virginia colony. His son, Thomas Davis (of Warwicksqueake) inherited James's estate, and his wife Rachel received 100 acres in 1633 for being an ancient planter.The Davis family went on to be governor of Delaware, Revolutionary war veterans, U.S. Navy veterans, and simple farmers. The family moved from Virginia to Delaware to Tennessee and settled down in Ashley creek settlement in the Missouri Ozarks in 1859.
