= Popham Beach =

Sandy beach in Maine, United States

Coordinates: 43°44.5′N 69°47.4′W

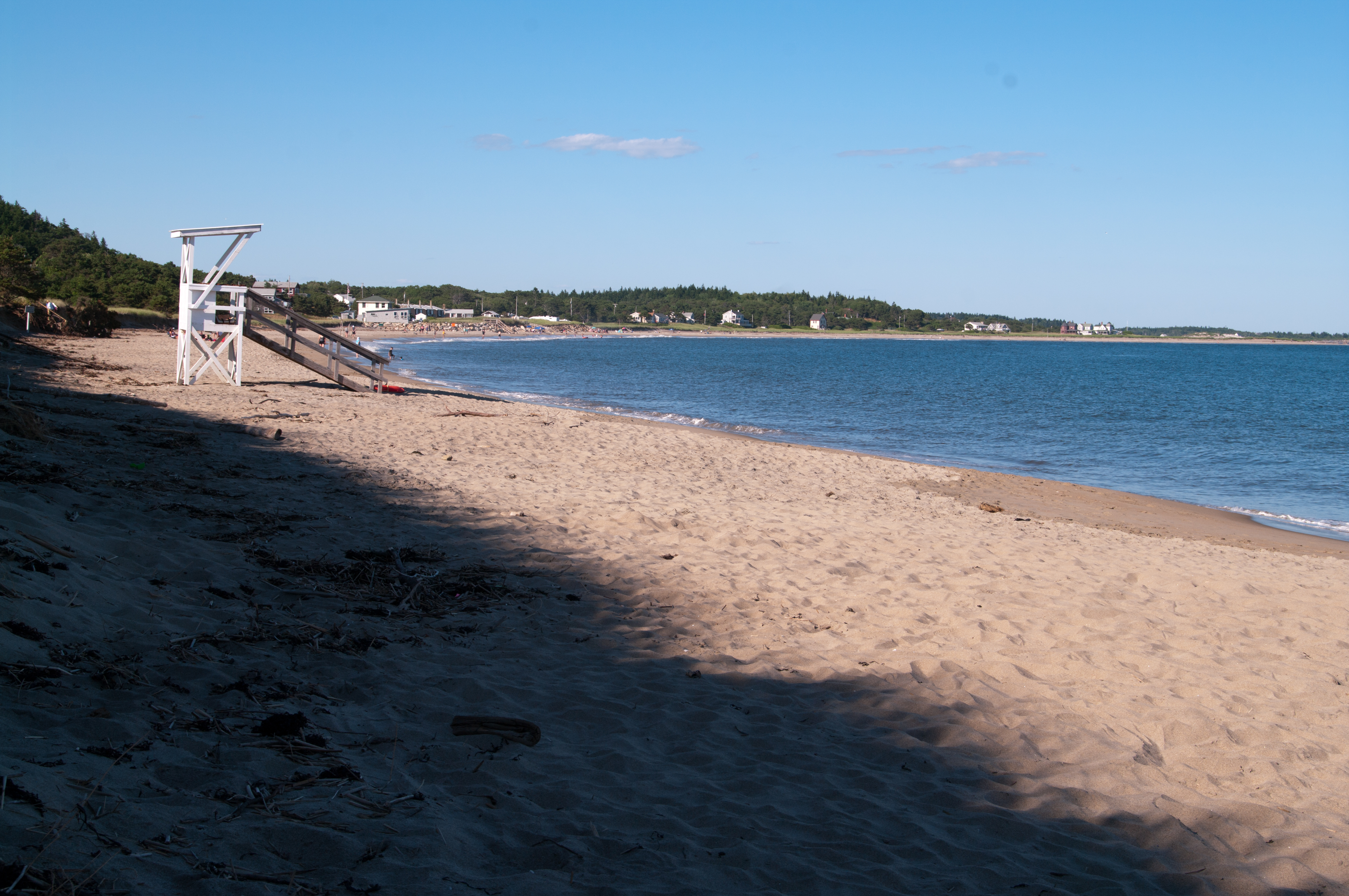
Popham beach on an evening in July

Popham Beach is a sandy beach in Maine that extends southwest about three miles from Fort Popham, at the mouth of the Kennebec River, toward the mouth of the Morse River. It is near the site of the short-lived Popham Colony, founded in 1607 and abandoned the following year. The beach and the surrounding area are considered part of the town of Phippsburg in Sagadahoc County.

At the southwestern end of the beach, access is granted via the popular Popham Beach State Park, administered by Maine Bureau of Parks & Lands. The northeastern end of the beach is accessed via paths around historic Fort Popham, a handful of private parking lots and pathways, as well as the Ocean View Campground situated near the boundary of the state park.

Popular recreational activities at Popham Beach include walking, beachcombing, sunbathing, sightseeing, kite flying, swimming, and fishing for species such as striped bass and bluefish. Casual hikers also enjoy exploring the remnants of Fort Baldwin on the opposite side of the cove from Fort Popham. The state park is patrolled by lifeguards during the warmer months, with no lifeguards on duty at any time beyond the state park boundary. At low tide, sandbars are exposed that provide brief access to Wood Island and Fox Island. The Pond Island and Seguin Island lighthouses are easily visible from the shores of Popham Beach, and their distinct foghorns are audible for miles around.

Pets are allowed on parts of Popham Beach all year round, but there are special rules that apply to pets for parts of the beach in the state park. It is a rule in the state park that you must pick up any waste that your pet may leave behind.

Popham Beach State Park is a popular day trip destination for area residents, while the cottages (and their access roads) at the northeastern end of the beach are privately owned. There are many cottages available for seasonal rental, as well as a seasonal motel and a bed and breakfast, the latter of which is housed in an old Coast Guard Station.

In recent years, increased erosion has threatened the southwestern end of the beach, with massive dune loss at the state park and the area bordering the park, which is home to numerous rental cottages and seasonal residences, along with the Ocean View Campground.

Part of the 1999 film Message in a Bottle was filmed at the beach.

Author Douglas Kennedy describes Popham Beach in several of his novels like "Pursuit of Happiness".
