= Fort Algernon =

Early colonial fort built in Virginia in 1609

Coordinates: 37.0018°N 76.3097°W

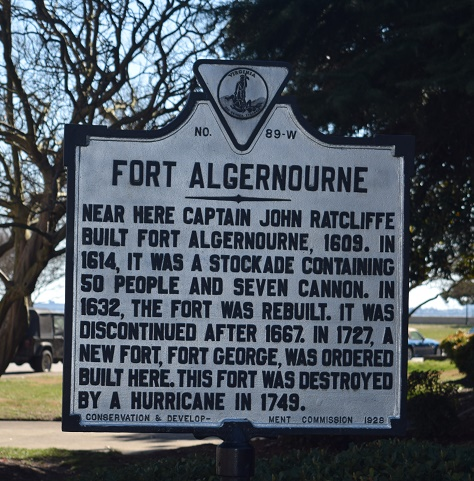
Historical marker of Fort Algernon

Fort Algernon (also spelled Fort Algernourne) was established in the fall of 1609 at the mouth of Hampton Roads at Point Comfort in the Virginia Colony by Captain John Ratcliffe. A strategic point for guarding the shipping channel leading from the Chesapeake Bay, it would be the site for a series of military forts for the next few centuries, culminating with Fort Monroe built in the 1830s. The area is now known as Old Point Comfort. Long part of Elizabeth City County, the site is now located in the independent city of Hampton, Virginia.

After Captain John Smith, President of the Council at Jamestown was deposed in September 1609 and soon returned to England, Captain James Davis, who arrived with one of the ships of the Third Supply, assumed command of the newly built fort in October. It is likely that his pinnace, Virginia, the first ship built in the English colonies (at the Virginia Company of Plymouth's failed Popham Colony in present-day Maine), was anchored nearby.

The fort was very close to the Kecoughtans village, and in one of the acts leading to the First Anglo-Powhatan War, this village was attacked and captured by English colonists on July 9, 1610, presumably in retaliation for a settler killed by Nansemond indians days before at Blunt Poynt.

== Fort Charles and Fort Henry ==
Following the capture of the Kecoughtan Village in 1610, the settlers established two additional forts named For Charles and Fort Henry in the area. Fort Charles was built near where modern Interstate 64 begins to cross the James River just west of present-day Downtown Phoebus.

The humid conditions and exposure to Atlantic coastal storms caused the plank and timber forts at these locations to constantly deteriorate. In 1630, Capt Samuel Matthews was commissioned to rebuild the fort at Old Point Comfort, and it was completed by 1632.

== Fort George ==
The Virginia colonies would build another fort at Point Comfort called Fort George in 1728. Despite it being made of masonry, Fort George was washed away by The Coastal Hurricane of 1749. Without a fort to protect the waterway from warships, the British would successfully raid and pillage the area during the American Revolution and War of 1812.

== Fort Monroe ==
In 1816 the US Congress funded the Third System of seacoast defense forts. Fort Monroe was built on Point Comfort between 1819-1834.
