= Roger Ludlow =

English lawyer, founder and deputy governor of Connecticut Colony

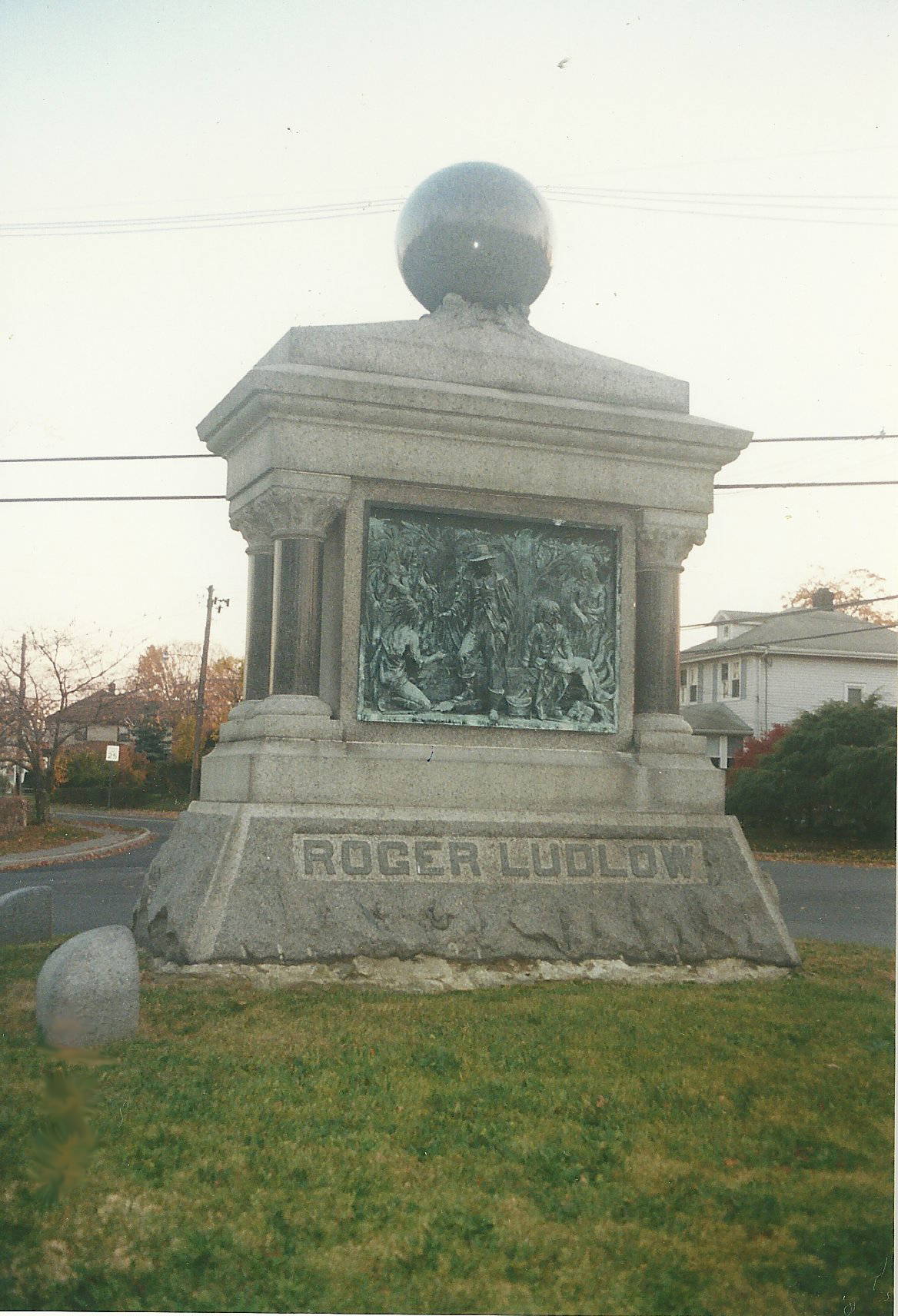

Deputy Governor of the Massachusetts Bay Colony
- In office 1634–1635

1st, 4th, and 10th Lieutenant Governor of Connecticut
- In office 1639–1640
- In office 1642–1643
- In office 1648–1649

Personal details
- Born: March 1590 Dinton, Wiltshire, Kingdom of England
- Died: between 1664 and 1668 (age 74-78) Dublin, Kingdom of Ireland
- Spouse: Mary Cogan
- Education: Balliol College, Oxford

Roger Ludlow (1590–1664/1668) was an English lawyer, magistrate, military officer, and colonist. He was active in the founding of the Colony of Connecticut, and helped draft laws for it and the nearby Massachusetts Bay Colony. Under his and John Mason's direction, Boston's first fortification, later known as Castle William and then Fort Independence was built on Castle Island in Boston harbor. Frequently at odds with his peers, he eventually also founded Fairfield and Norwalk before leaving New England entirely.

After a brief sojourn in Virginia, Ludlow returned to Europe, where he was appointed by a commission distributing seized and forfeited property in the aftermath of Oliver Cromwell's conquest of Ireland. He was also appointed a magistrate administering justice in Dublin, where he is believed to have died.

== Early life ==
Coat of Arms of Robert Ludlow

He was born in March 1590 in Dinton, Wiltshire, England. Roger was the second son of Sir Thomas Ludlow of Maiden Bradley, Wiltshire and Jane Pyle, sister of Sir Gabriel Pyle. He matriculated at Balliol College, Oxford in 1609 or 1610, and was admitted to the Honourable Society of the Inner Temple in 1612.

Ludlow sailed to America in May 1630 aboard the ship Mary & John with his wife Mary Cogan, a sister-in-law of Governor John Endicott of Massachusetts. They settled at Dorchester, Massachusetts, where they remained for five years. During that period he was chosen magistrate in the Court of Assistants for the Massachusetts Bay Colony. He was elected as Deputy Governor in 1634. During this time Ludlow successfully negotiated the first treaty between the English and the Pequot. In 1635 he was defeated by John Haynes for Governor.

== Settlement of Connecticut ==
In 1635 Roger Ludlow joined with other Puritans and Congregationalists who were dissatisfied with the rate of Anglican reforms, and sought to establish an ecclesiastical society subject to their own rules and regulations. The Massachusetts General Court granted them permission to settle the cities of Windsor, Wethersfield, and Hartford in the area now known as Connecticut. The Ludlows settled into Windsor. However, ownership of the lands for the new towns along the Connecticut River was called into dispute by the English holders of the Warwick Patent of 1631 that had been granted by Robert Rich, 2nd Earl of Warwick. The Massachusetts General Court established the March Commission to mediate the dispute between the Connecticut colony and the Saybrook Colony, and named Roger Ludlow as its head. The Commission named eight magistrates from the Connecticut towns to implement a legal system. The March Commission expired in March 1636, after which time the settlers continued to self-govern.

In late 1636 and early 1637 the burgeoning Connecticut colony faced armed conflict in the Pequot War. The Connecticut towns decided to send a force of more than 70 soldiers under the command of Captain John Mason, along with Narragansett and Mohegan allies to attack a Pequot fortified village on May 26, 1637. While Ludlow did not participate in what became known as the Mystic massacre, his role in the General Court meant that he took part in the decision to send the force. After the destruction at Mystic, Ludlow did leave the Windsor area to pursue Sassacus and other Pequot survivors, first to Saybrook at the mouth of the Connecticut river, then westward toward a village of the Sasqua, a branch of the Paugussett tribe, in an area called "Unquowa". On July 13, 1637, the Fairfield Swamp Fight in the swamps around Unquowa signaled the final military defeat of the remaining Pequots.

On May 29, 1638, Ludlow wrote to Massachusetts Governor John Winthrop that the colonists wanted to "unite ourselves to walk and lie peaceably and lovingly together." Ludlow was a framer of a document called the Fundamental Orders, which was adopted on January 14, 1639. The Fundamental Orders of Connecticut is the world's first written constitution for a self-governing people.

Roger Ludlow was a magistrate in 1637 and 1638, and was then named as the first Deputy Governor of Connecticut. He was also chosen as a magistrate in 1640, and every year from that date until he left the colony in 1654, except in 1642 and 1648, when he was again chosen Deputy Governor. In 1643 Ludlow was one of the representatives from Connecticut in the negotiations which led to the confederation of the colonies.

== Founding of Fairfield ==
In early 1639 Ludlow's political rival from Massachusetts John Haynes, who came to Connecticut not long after Ludlow, was elected governor. Ludlow then chose to take leave from Hartford and Windsor and obtained a charter from the General Court to begin a settlement at "Pequannocke" (present day Bridgeport). He left with a group of like-minded settlers from Windsor, Watertown, and Concord to purchase property along the coast of Long Island Sound west of the New Haven Colony. While on this task Ludlow recalled the attraction of the salt marshes west of the Pequonnock River near "Unquowa" and purchased land there from the native Sachem and founded the town of Fairfield. Ludlow settled his family in the new town, but returned to Hartford in the fall of 1639. In a session of the General Court held October 10, 1639 Ludlow was censured and fined by the Court for having exceeded the terms of the charter granted to settle areas that were to have been east of Fairfield. Governor Haynes and Thomas Welles visited Fairfield to investigate the settlement and apparently found that it was acceptable.

== Founding of Norwalk ==
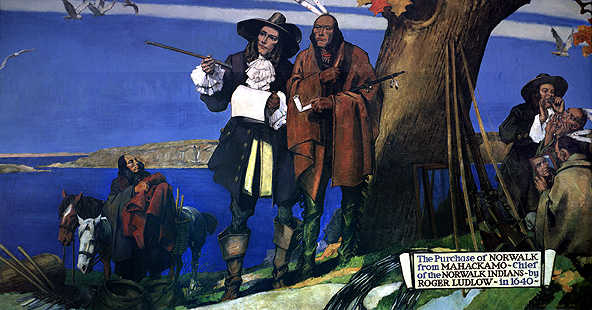
Purchase of Norwalk by Harry Townsend, a WPA mural in Norwalk City Hall

The purchase of property and settlement in the coastal area may have been part of an effort to obtain a Connecticut title to the area instead of allowing the land to be sold to the Dutch from New Netherland or the New Haven Colonists. Early in 1640, Ludlow purchased land from the Siwanoy Sachem Mahackemo located still further west in an area that would become Norwalk, Connecticut. Ludlow contracted with fourteen men for the original planting of Norwalk. In 1649, Nathaniel Ely and Richard Olmsted became the first two settlers.

== Ireland ==
Having been tried for slandering Mrs. Thomas Staples of Fairfield (the accusation was that Ludlow had said that she was a witch) and lost as well as being appointed commander of a militia to defend Fairfield against invasion by the Dutch, Ludlow grew weary of colonial life. He left Fairfield in April or May 1654. He first sailed to Virginia Colony to visit his brother George who had settled there. Then Ludlow left Virginia to return to England and made it to Ireland by September 1654. Ludlow settled at Dublin and in November 1654 was appointed to serve the council as an adjudicator of matters relating to property law. The appointment may have been made at the request of Oliver Cromwell. He served on the commission from 1654 to 1658. A new commission was appointed and Ludlow was again assigned to it in 1658. He was also appointed to the post of Master in Chancery in Ireland.

He was a resident and member of St. Michan's Church in Dublin. His wife Mary died and was buried on June 3, 1664, according to records kept at the parish church. Parish records of his death in Dublin (presumed to have taken place between 1664 and 1668) no longer exist.

== Legacy ==
- Roger Ludlowe Middle School and Fairfield Ludlowe High School, both in Fairfield, are named for him.
- Ludlow, Massachusetts, and Ludlow, Vermont are named after him.

== See also ==
- Great Migration (Puritan)
- List of lieutenant governors of Connecticut
- Saybrook Colony
- Anglo-Dutch Wars
- Mahackemo

== Bibliography ==
- Taylor, John M. (1900). Roger Ludlow The Colonial Lawmaker. New York and London: G. P. Putnam's, Knickerbocker Press.
- Cohn, Henry S. (1988). Connecticut Constitutional History, 1636-1776.
- Fennell, Christopher Fennell (1998). Plymouth Colony Legal Structure.
- Gocher, W. H. (1904). Wadsworth, or the Charter Oak.
