= Virginia (pinnace) =

Pinnace built in 1607-08 by colonists at the Popham Colony

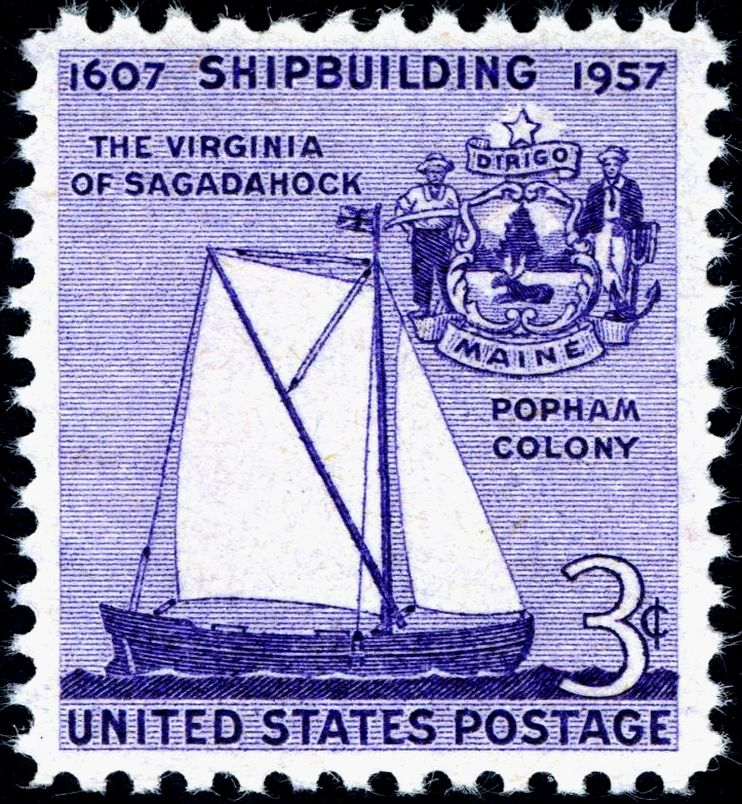
- Virginia, as commemorated on a 1957 U.S. Postage stamp

History

England
- Name: Virginia (sometimes Virginia of Sagadahock, Virginia of the North Colony)
- Namesake: Queen Elizabeth I
- Ordered: Summer, 1607
- Builder: Digby of London
- Laid down: Autumn, 1607
- Launched: Spring, 1608
- In service: Spring 1608
- Home port: Popham Colony, then Jamestown, Virginia Colony
- Fate: unknown

General characteristics
- Type: pinnace
- Displacement: 30 tons
- Length: 50 ft (15 m)
- Beam: 14.5 ft (4.4 m)
- Draft: 6.5 ft (2.0 m)
- Propulsion: At least three rigs possible: a) square-rigged main mast, gaff-rigged second mast, square sail under bowsprit, topsail; b) fore-and-aft rigged with sprit mainsail; and/or c) aft-rigged mizzen mast with lateen sail.
- Sail plan: At least three rigs possible: a) square-rigged main mast, gaff-rigged second mast, square sail under bowsprit, topsail; b) fore-and-aft rigged with sprit mainsail; and/or c) aft-rigged mizzen mast with lateen sail.
- Range: coastal, ocean
- Notes: Virginia was the first English ship built in the Americas to cross the Atlantic; Virginia is an example of the "small" pinnace design which could be fitted with a variety of rigs, and thereby had great flexibility as to designated tasks.

Virginia was a pinnace built in 1607 and 1608 by English colonists at the Popham Colony. The ship was a project of the Plymouth Company, branch of the proprietary Virginia Company, on land England claimed as belonging to the Virginia Colony. She was the first English ocean-going vessel built in the New World, and a demonstration of the new colony's ability to build ships. The second and third "local" pinnaces (Deliverance and Patience) were built soon afterwards in Bermuda following the loss of Sea Venture during the Third Supply.

Virginia was built at the mouth of the Kennebec River in what is now Phippsburg, Maine. Little is known about the details of her architecture, but written accounts of the colony and historical records of similar ships suggest that Virginia was a pinnace that displaced about 30 tons and measured somewhat less than 50 ft (15 m) long, with a beam of 14 ft 6 in (4.42 m). She had a flush main deck, drew about 6 ft 6 in (1.98 m) fully loaded, and had a freeboard of less than 2 ft (0.61 m).

== Background ==
The Popham Colony, also known as the Sagadahoc Colony, was established in 1607 by the Plymouth Company. It was situated in the present town of Phippsburg, Maine, at the mouth of the Sagadahoc River, now the Kennebec River. The mission was to establish an English presence in North Virginia, explore the area for gold and other valuable commodities, find the Northwest Passage, establish relations and trade with the native people (primarily for fur), and show that the area could supply all of the resources necessary to build ships.

During the 14 months the colony existed, the colonists completed a major project: the construction of a 30-ton ship, a pinnace, called Virginia. It was the first known ocean-going ship to be built in what would later become the United States of America by Europeans. It was also meant to show that the colony could be used for shipbuilding. The design of Virginia allowed several different rigs and was very versatile. Virginia could be used for coastal exploration and fishing, the North Atlantic fishing grounds, or a trans-Atlantic journey.

The term "pinnace" could mean anything from a full-rigged pinnace to a smaller boat that could be stowed (or towed) and used as a ship's tender. Virginia at 30 tons was in the middle of this range and was designed primarily for coastal exploration and defense. To sail Virginia to England the rigging was modified from coastal rigging to full ocean rigging.

== Design ==
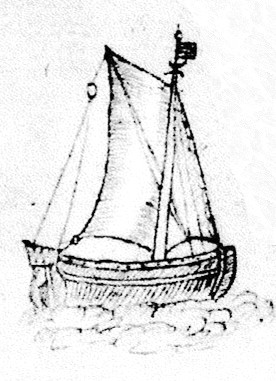
Pinnace on Hunt's 1607 Plan

Virginia would have been about 56 feet (17 m) long with a beam of 15 feet 5 inches, a flush main deck that drew approximately 6 feet 5 inches fully loaded, a freeboard of less than 2 feet, and a weight of approximately 30 tons. Hull design and framing were used to estimate a replica design. For ocean voyages, Virginia would likely have been rigged with a square-rigged main-mast, a much smaller second mast that was gaff rigged, and a small square sail under the bowsprit. The main-mast on many pinnaces would have been large enough to carry a small topsail.

For coastal work, Virginia would have used a fore-and-aft rig with a sprit mainsail and one headsail. How the coastal rigging would have been changed for a cross-Atlantic voyage is not yet fully understood. In John Walker's drawing of Virginia when rigged for a trans Atlantic voyage, an aft-rigged mizzen mast carries a sail that resembles a lateen sail more closely than a spanker. This variety of rigs enabled the 'small' pinnaces of this era for several different assignments. They could be used as fishing boats, storage at anchor, tender to large ships or supply ships that were often towed to their destination by a larger ship.

There is a small 17th-century sketch of a pinnace on John Hunt's October 8, 1607, map of Fort St George at the Popham Colony in midcoast Maine - see image. This map was found in an archive in 1888 by the historian Alexander Brown in the Simancas General Archive in Spain. This boat is thought to be the 30-ton pinnace Virginia that was built in 1607–1608 at the Popham colony on the Sagadahoc River (now Kennebec River) in southern Maine. Assuredly, lofting was done by 'eye'. Assembly was done under the direction of shipwright Digby of London.

== Voyages ==
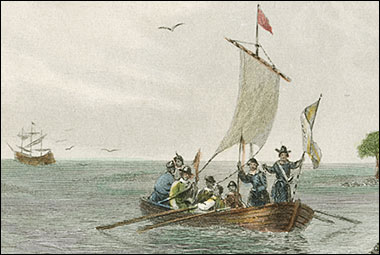
Artist's depiction of the Virginia pinnace

On October 17, 1608, the Popham Colony was abandoned and the colonists boarded Virginia and the supply ship Mary and John to return to England. Structurally sound after her first ocean crossing, Virginia had more work to do. On May 23, 1609, a new Charter of the Virginia Company, drafted by Francis Bacon, was signed by King James I of England. This Charter granted a vast extension of territory and expanded powers to the Company, spurring a renewed effort to save the remaining colony at Jamestown.

Virginia was one of two pinnaces and seven larger ships in the fleet known as the Third Supply. With 500-600 people, the supply mission left Falmouth, Cornwall, England on June 8, 1609, directly for the colony in Virginia by way of the Azores and Bermuda. The flagship of this supply mission was the Sea Venture, which was the first single-timbered merchantman built in England, and also the first dedicated emigration ship. The fleet encountered a powerful three-day hurricane near Bermuda in late July 1609. resulting in the loss of two ships, Catch and Sea Venture. Virginia left the supply fleet near the Azores presumably to return to England. She arrived undamaged at Jamestown on October 3, 1609, with 16 soldiers, six weeks after the other ships that were damaged in the Bermuda hurricane. It appears that Virginia missed the hurricane.

The battered ships of the third supply mission arrived in August, 1609, with 300 colonists and scant supplies to find the Jamestown colony with fractured leadership and under siege from the Powhatan tribe. When Virginia arrived in early October, John Smith the leader of Jamestown was seriously injured, and James Davies was sent with Virginia to command Fort Algernon at Point Comfort.

By June 1610, over 80% of the colonists at Jamestown Island had died, and the remaining colonists (about 60) boarded Virginia (along with the Bermuda-built Deliverance and Patience) to seek rescue north of Chesapeake Bay. Captain Edward Brewster commanded the pinnace, and while passing by Mulberry Island in the James River, the colonists were intercepted by the supply mission of Lord De la Warr.

The last historical record of Virginia was June 1610 when Captain Robert Tyndall was directed to take Virginia to catch fish in the Chesapeake Bay between Cape Henry and Cape Charles.

== Reconstruction ==
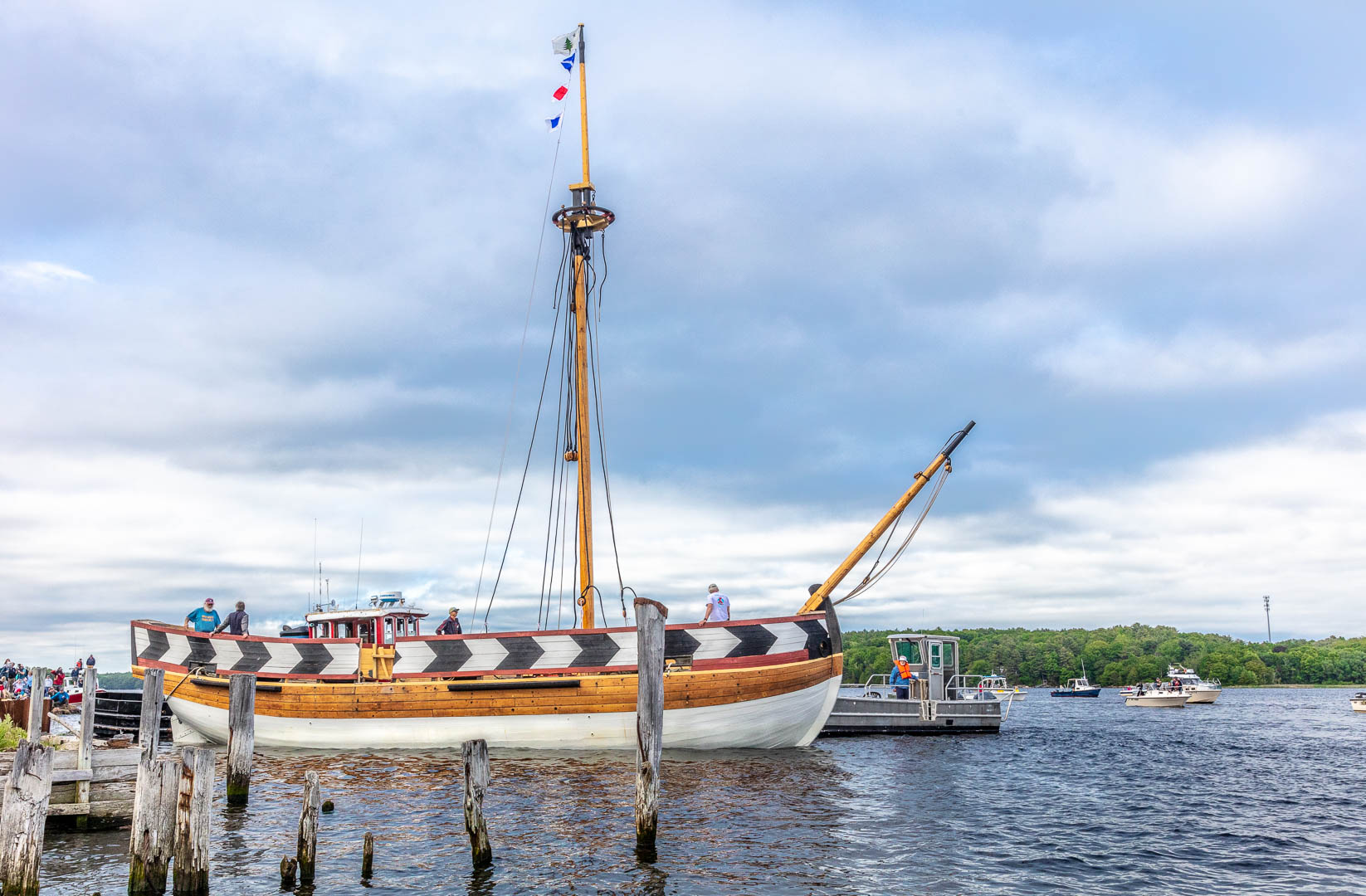
The Virginia is launched into the Kennebec River in Bath, Maine

The pinnace Virginia was reconstructed by an all-volunteer group Maine' First Ship just upriver from the site it was originally built. The design was completed in 2007 after extensive research, hampered by the lack of historical information. The keel was laid on July 3, 2011. The reconstruction was done in and around the Bath Freight Shed in Bath, Maine. Virginia was launched on June 4, 2022. The goal is to create a floating classroom for students of all ages, promote an appreciation of Maine's early shipbuilding heritage, the Popham Colony, and its relationship with the Wabanaki.

== Bibliography ==
- Mathew Baker and the Art of the Shipwright (in German). Baker was royal ship builder under Elizabeth I. His Fragments of Ancient Shipbuilding (1586) is considered a ground breaking work and invaluable for the study of 16th century shipbuilding. Sept.15, 2005. Chapter 3 (pp. 107–165) of Stephen Johnston, ‘Making mathematical practice: gentlemen, practitioners and artisans in Elizabethan England’ (Ph.D. Cambridge, 1994).
- Some Seventeenth-Century Vessels and the Sparrow-Hawk, by William Avery Baker. Pilgrim Society Note, Series One, Number 28, 1980, April 30, 2006 (Plymouth Hall Museum, Plymouth Massachusetts. Historical notes about pinnaces and shallops used during the early years of the Plymouth Colony).
- Ashmore Family from Eng to Va, Md, Ga & Ar Genealogy, tales about early colonists in the mid-Atlantic Colonies and sea battles between the adventurers of Maryland and Virginia Colony. Four pinnaces are mentioned by name.
- 'Relation' concerning Captain James Davis (1580–1623) and the early settlement of New England & Virginia.
