= Popham Beach State Park =

State park in Sagadahoc County, Maine

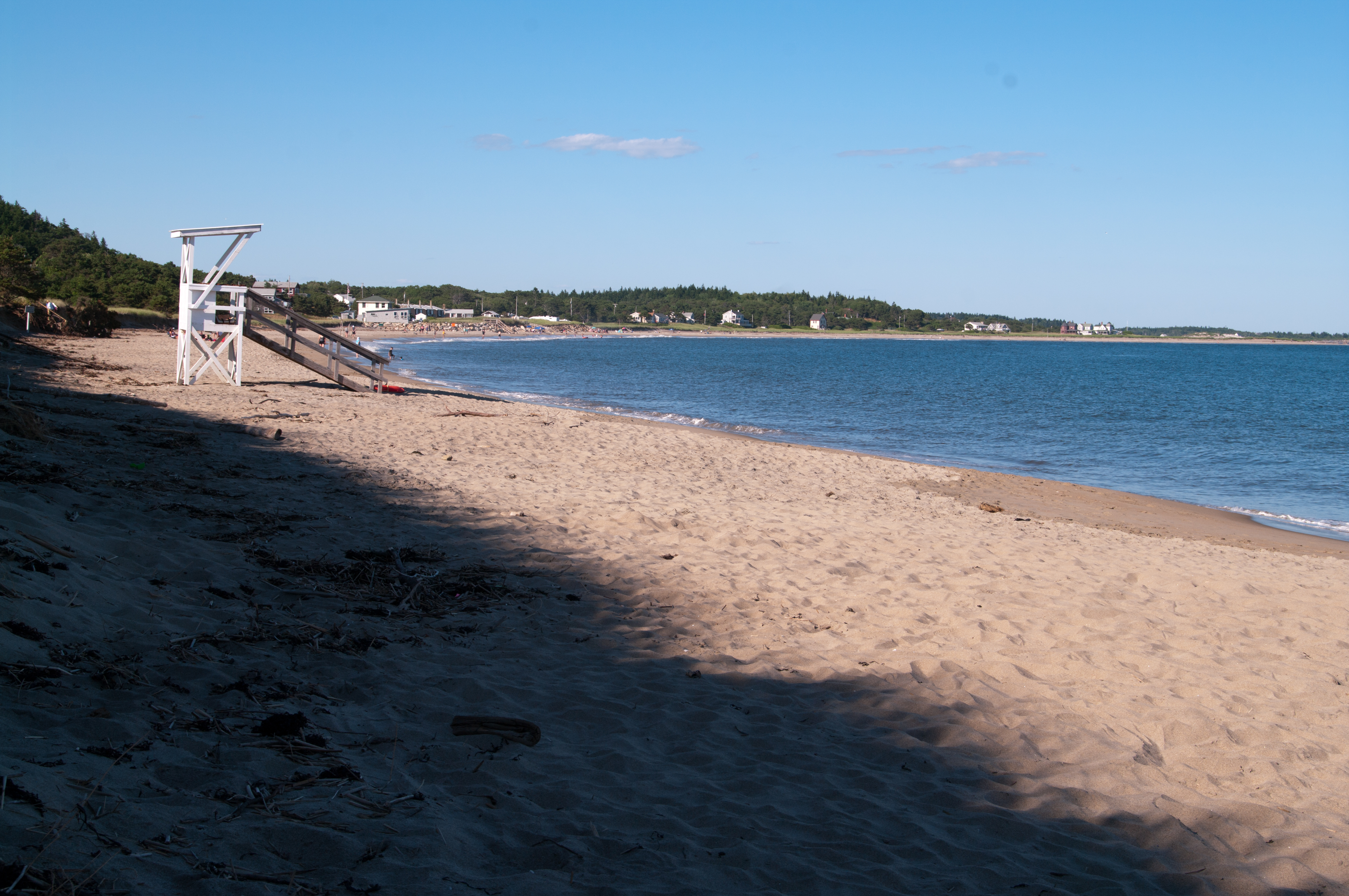

- Location within Maine
- Interactive map of Popham Beach State Park
- Location: Phippsburg, Maine, United States
- Coordinates: 43°44′18″N 69°47′54″W
- Area: 605 acres (245 ha)
- Elevation: 20 ft (6.1 m)
- Established: 1968
- Administrator: Maine Department of Agriculture, Conservation and Forestry
- Website: Official website
- Maine State Parks

Popham Beach State Park is a public recreation area covering 605 acres (245 ha) on the Atlantic Ocean in the town of Phippsburg, Sagadahoc County, Maine. It is the state's highest volume day use State Park. The state park occupies a dynamic shoreline landscape that has created a peninsula between the mouth of the Morse River and the Atkins Bay portion of the Kennebec River. The park is managed by the Maine Department of Agriculture, Conservation and Forestry.

== Geology ==
The area is subject to significant changes in the landscape, including dune destruction and rebuilding, loss of forest lands, and tombolo breaching. Efforts made to stop the erosion have included, beach scraping in 2010 to redirect Morse River, placing repurposed Christmas Trees to collect wind blown sand, replanting of dune grass, and restricting human foot traffic in dune areas to reduce stress on vegetation.

== Activities and amenities ==
The park is used for swimming, kayaking, fishing, picnicking, and hiking. The peninsula also is the site of historic Fort Popham, historic Fort Baldwin, and the remnants of the Popham Colony.
