= Mahackemo =

Mark of Sachem Mahackemo, Norwalk Land Records Vol. 1

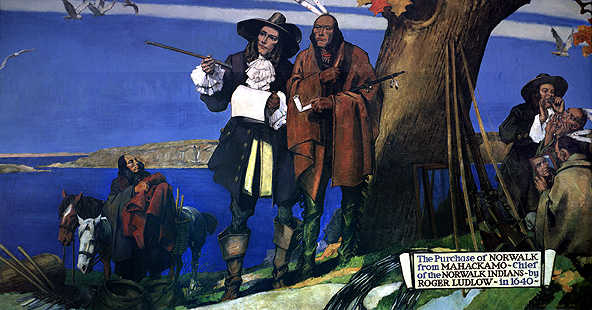
Purchase of Norwalk by Harry Townsend, a WPA mural in Norwalk City Hall

Mahackemo (or Mahackamo) was chief of the Norwalke Indians, a small tribe of the Siwanoy, who sold land to Roger Ludlow in 1640 (Old Style or 1641 New Style) which later became Norwalk, Connecticut.

== See also ==
- History of Norwalk, Connecticut
