= Fort Popham =

- Fort Popham Memorial
- U.S. National Register of Historic Places
- U.S. National Historic Site
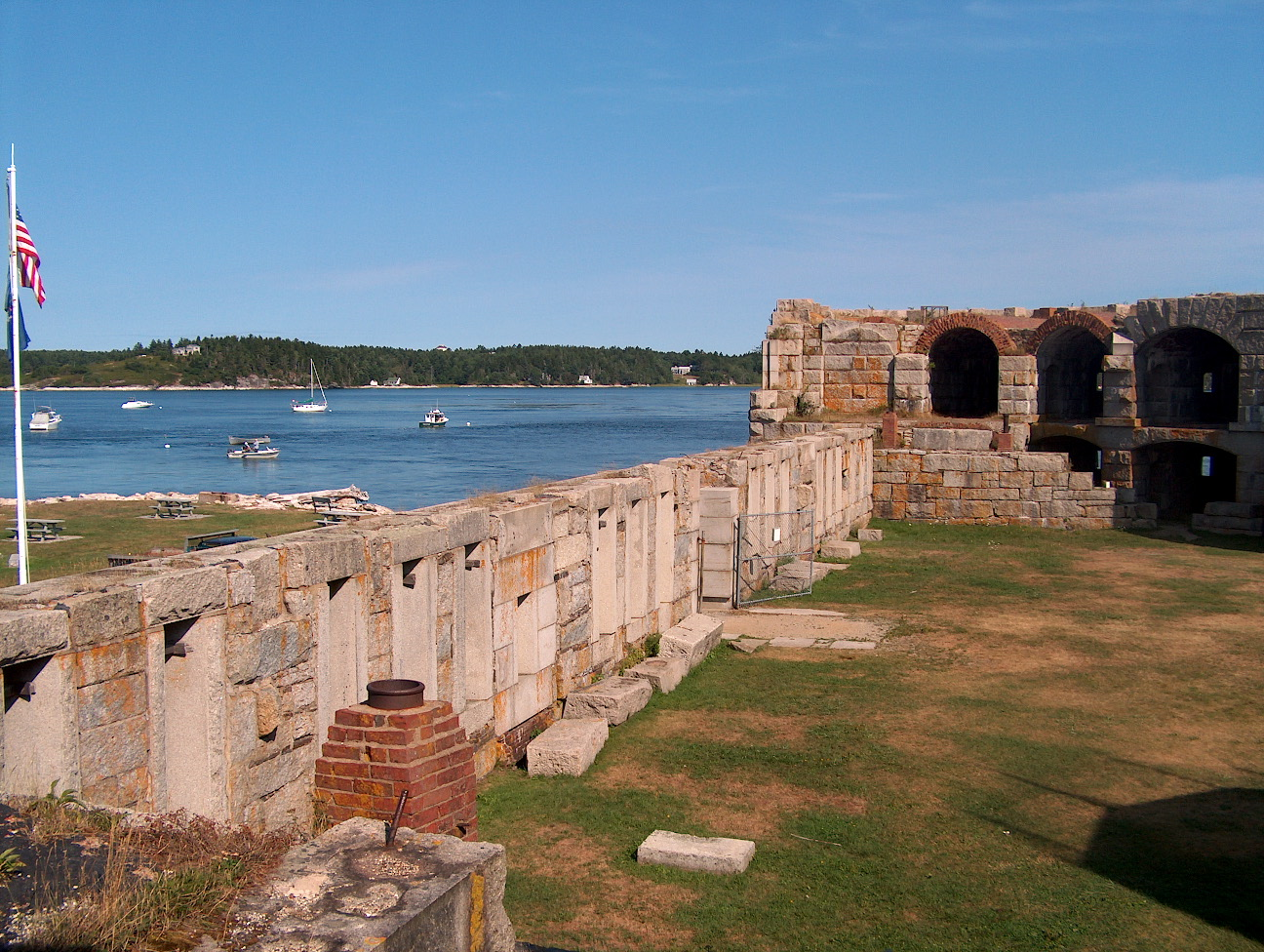
- Fort Popham and the Kennebec River

- Location within Maine
- Interactive map of Fort Popham Memorial
- Location: Phippsburg, Maine
- Coordinates: 43°45′17″N 69°47′02″W
- Built: 1861
- Architect: US Army Corps of Engineers
- Visitation: 226,919 (2024)
- NRHP reference No.: 69000012
- Fort Popham
- Part of Coast Defenses of the Kennebec
- Phippsburg, Maine

Site information
- Type: Fortification
- Owner: Public - State of Maine
- Controlled by: State of Maine
- Open to the public: partly

Site history
- Built: 1857–1869
- Built by: U.S. Army Corps of Engineers
- In use: 1864–1865, 1898–1899, 1917–1918, 1941–1945
- Materials: Granite

Garrison information
- Garrison: Civil War: 7th Unassigned Company of Maine Infantry; World War I: Coast Defenses of Portland; World War II: Harbor Defenses of Portland
- Added to NRHP: 1 October 1969

Fort Popham is a Civil War-era coastal defense fortification at the mouth of the Kennebec River in Phippsburg, Maine. It is located in sight of the short-lived Popham Colony and, like the colony, named for George Popham, the colony's leader. The site is preserved as Fort Popham State Historic Site.

== Predecessors ==
During the American Revolution a minor fortification stood on this site; in 1808 the federal government built a small battery to accommodate guns on field carriages on this location as part of the Second System of fortifications that guarded the coast. These forts and batteries were built shortly after the passage of Thomas Jefferson's Embargo Act of 1807, which prohibited all exports from the US as an attempt to exert pressure on Britain and France, which had been taking actions against US shipping. The first use of some of these forts was to enforce the embargo. The embargo was deeply unpopular in New England and had severe economic effects there; the embargo was repealed in March 1809, but the situation with Britain ultimately led to the War of 1812. It was felt that these forts were built as much to enforce the embargo as to defend the country, and they were derisively known as "embargo forts". The battery is mentioned in the Secretary of War's reports on fortifications for December 1808 and December 1811. It was called the "Battery on Hunnewell's Point" or the "Georgetown Battery" (at the time Georgetown included Phippsburg). In 1811 it was described as "An enclosed work, with a battery of six heavy guns mounted, a small magazine, and wooden barracks for 40". The battery remained manned until 1815 and saw minor action during the War of 1812. After the war four of the guns were relocated to a new battery at Cox's Head, north of Fort Popham on the west bank of the Kennebec. This was a brick fort with barracks for 105 men.

== History ==
Construction of Fort Popham was authorized in 1857 as part of the Third System of fortifications but did not begin until 1861. The fort was built from granite blocks quarried on nearby Fox and Dix Islands. It had a 30-foot (9 m)-high wall facing the mouth of the Kennebec River and was built in a crescent shape, measuring approximately 500 feet (150 m) in circumference.

During the closing months of the American Civil War, from October 1864 to July 1865, the fort was garrisoned by the 7th Unassigned Company of Maine Infantry. The 7th Company was commanded by Captain Augustin Thompson, who is best known as the inventor of Moxie soda.

Fort Popham was originally designed to mount 42 heavy guns, a mix of 10-inch and 15-inch Rodman guns, but construction was halted in 1869 with only two of the planned three tiers completed. In the late 19th century, Fort Popham's armament consisted of 36 Rodman guns and some 300-pounder (10-inch) and smaller Parrott rifles. One of the Rodman guns was donated to the town of Bowdoinham to remember its soldiers who died in the Civil War. The cannon is still there. A 100-pounder (6.4-inch) Parrott rifle sits near the fort grounds; it was listed as being at the fort in 1903. The back side of Fort Popham was built with a low moated curtain containing a central gate and 20 musket ports.

War experience showed that masonry forts were vulnerable to modern rifled guns. As a result, in 1869 construction at Fort Popham stopped before the fortification was completed. The fort was garrisoned again after additional work was performed during the Spanish–American War and World War I. In the 1890s Fort Popham received new facilities for a controlled minefield in the river at the fort as part of the Endicott program of improved fortifications. In 1898, shortly after the Spanish–American War broke out, Congress made numerous emergency appropriations, including $3,200 to deploy the mines in the Kennebec. In 1899, following the war, a single 8-inch M1888 gun was mounted near the fort on a converted Rodman carriage, joining four 15-inch Rodman guns and the 100-pounder Parrott rifle that remains near the fort; the 8-inch gun was removed in 1910. This was an emergency measure to provide modern guns at threatened locations until the Endicott program forts could be completed. Under this program, construction of Fort Baldwin on the headland above Fort Popham began in 1905 with longer-range guns, which eventually rendered Fort Popham obsolete. However, at the time Fort Baldwin was built, Fort Popham remained important due to the minefield facilities.

Fort Popham was probably part of the Coast Defenses of the Kennebec command at some point. However, references indicate this command was combined with the Coast Defenses of Portland at some time prior to 1917. During World War I, Forts Popham and Baldwin were garrisoned by about 200 men of the 13th and 29th Coast Artillery companies of the Coast Defenses of Portland. Although Fort Baldwin was disarmed in 1924, the mine facilities at Fort Popham may have remained operational through World War II, during which Fort Baldwin was rearmed with towed artillery.

== Present ==
The fort, located two miles (3 km) from popular Popham Beach State Park, is open to the public as Fort Popham State Historic Site. It was added to the National Register of Historic Places as Fort Popham Memorial on October 1, 1969, reference number 69000012.

== Gallery ==
The fort's setting

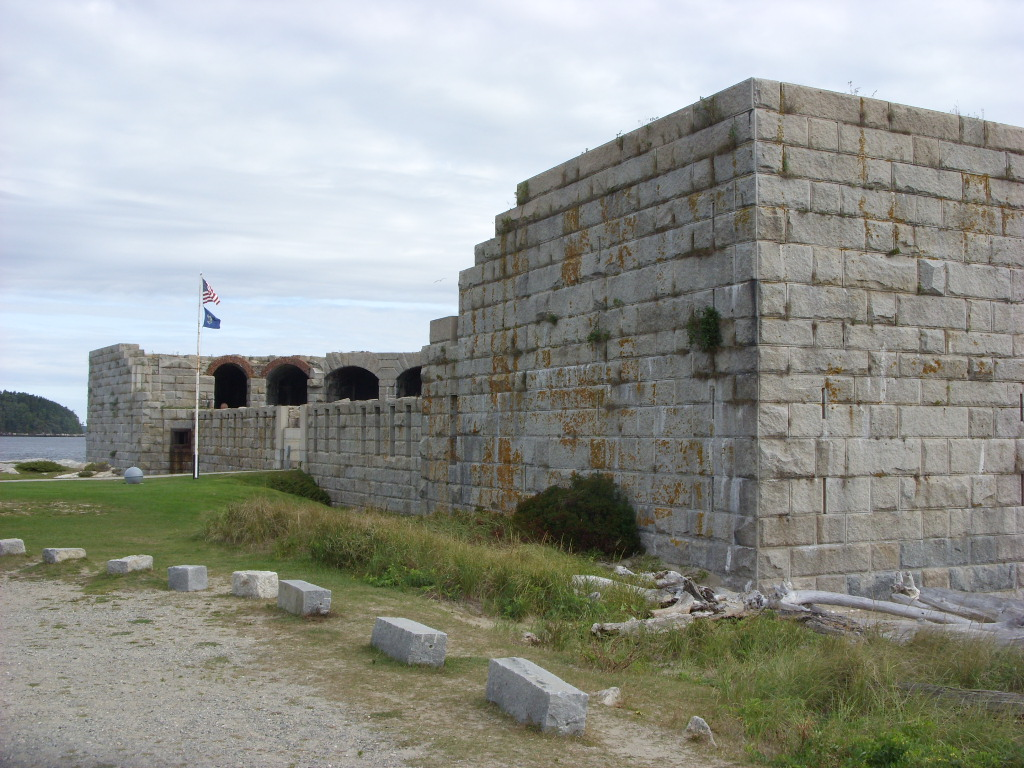
Entrance

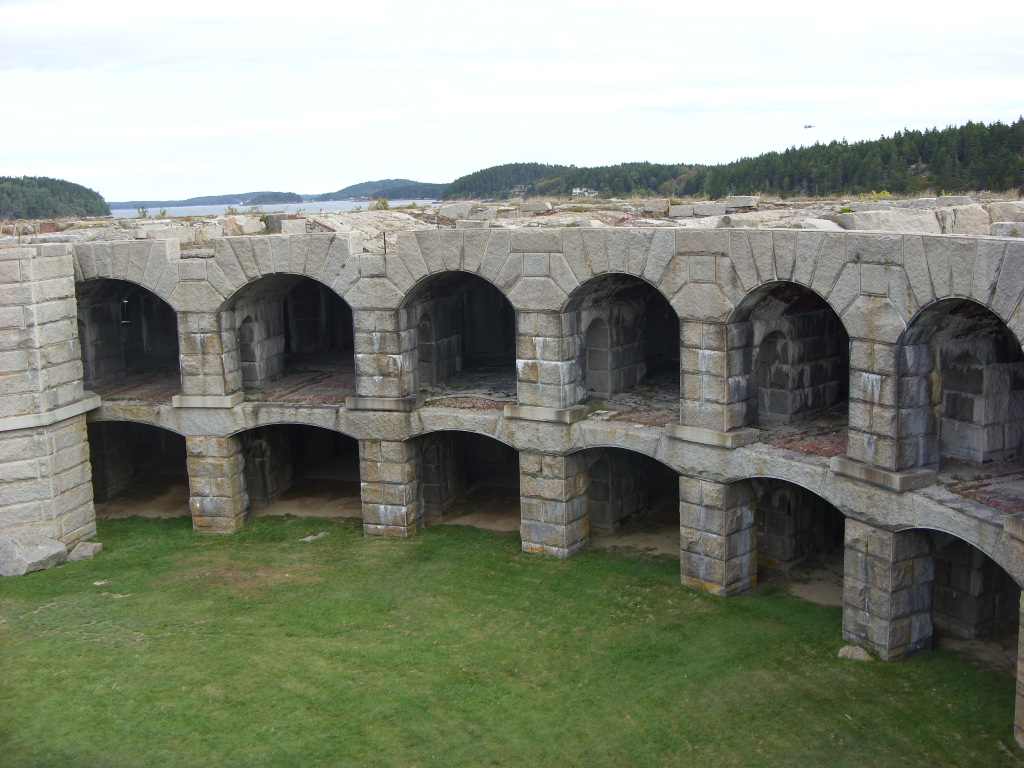
Interior

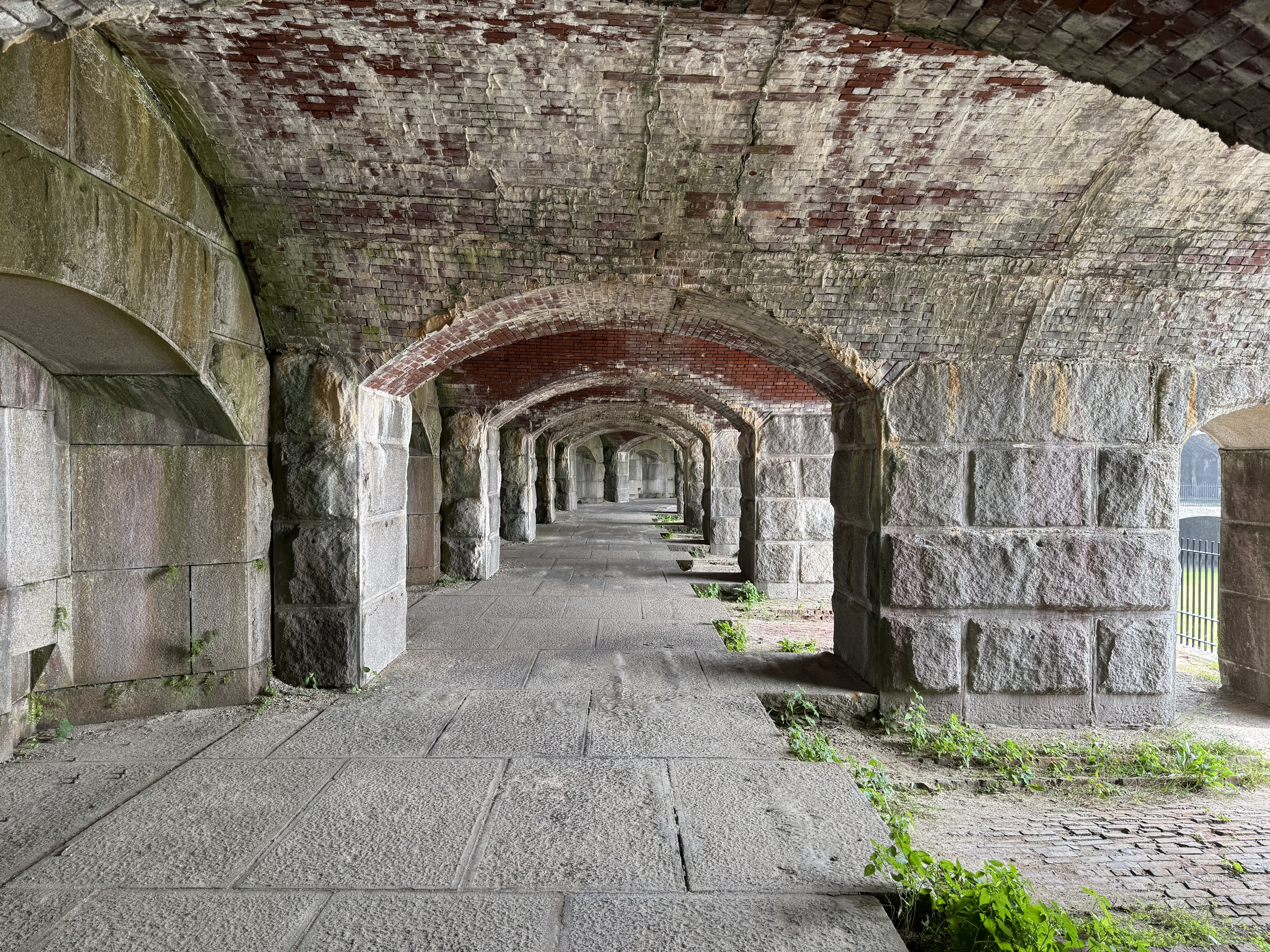
One of the fort's hallways

== See also ==
- National Register of Historic Places listings in Sagadahoc County, Maine
