= Mary and John =

17th-century ship

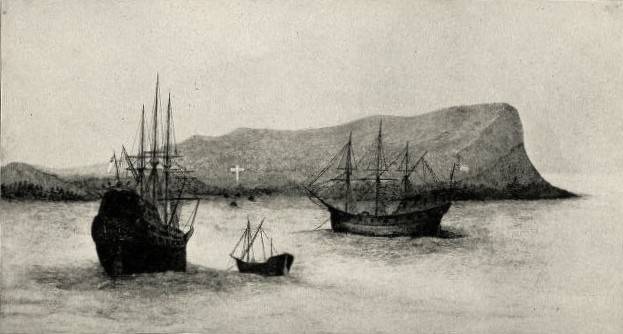
- Conjectural sketch of Popham's ships Gift of God and Mary and John at Monhegan Island
- Name: Mary and John, Mary & John
- Namesake: Mary and John Winthrop
- Owner: Gilbert family (1607), Roger Ludlow (1630)
- In service: 1607
- Fate: unknown

General characteristics
- Tons burthen: 400 tons

Mary and John was a 400-ton ship that is known to have sailed between England and the American colonies four times from 1607 to 1634. Named in tribute to John and Mary Winthrop she was captained by Robert Davies and owned by Roger Ludlow (1590–1664), one of the assistants of the Massachusetts Bay Colony. The ship's first two voyages to North America were to what is now Maine in June 1607 and September 1608, transporting emigrants to the colonies and back to England. In 1609, Samuel Argall also used the ship to navigate a shorter route to the Colony of Virginia via Bermuda. The third voyage to Maine was on March 20, 1630, bearing 130 colonists, and the fourth on March 26, 1634, to Nantaskut in the Massachusetts Bay Colony.

== 1607 voyages ==
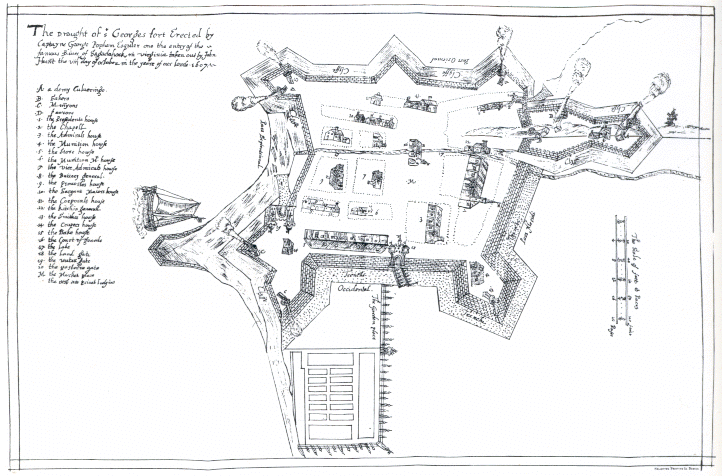
Map of Ft. St. George, constructed by the colonists.

The ships Gift of God captained by John Elliott and led by George Popham, and Mary and John, captained by Robert Davis and led by Raleigh Gilbert (son of Humphrey Gilbert), departed Falmouth, England, on June 1, 1607. They arrived on the coast of Maine on August 16, 1607. They arrived with about 120 English colonists, who chose the mouth of the Sagadahoc River (now known as the Kennebec River) on a site known today as Sabino Head, Maine on August 13, 1607. The colonists were financially backed by Sir John Popham, Chief Justice of England, and led by his nephew George. They hoped to ship timber back to England, to find gold, silver, and other valuable minerals, and to establish a fur trade with the local eastern Abenaki people. Mary and John stayed until October 6, 1607, when it returned to Plymouth, England, arriving on December 1, 1607.

The colonists built an admiral's house, a chapel, a storehouse, a cooperage, and a guardhouse. They also built a 30-ton ship they named Virginia. The ship Gift of God remained at the settlement until December 16 when it too sailed for England, carrying nearly half the colonists with it with the purpose of conserving the outpost's supplies. The Popham Colony, England's first attempt at a New England settlement, didn't prosper. During a harsh winter season, George Popham died on February 5, 1608, and Raleigh Gilbert assumed leadership. In the late summer, the relief ship Mary and John arrived carrying supplies. Captain Robert Davies of Mary and John also brought news that Raleigh Gilbert's brother Sir John Gilbert had also died leaving the colony's leader as his heir. Raleigh Gilbert elected to return to England, and the remainder of the colonists followed him aboard Virginia and Mary and John. In mid-October 1608, after only 14 months, the colonists abandoned the colony.

== 1609 voyage ==
In 1609, The Virginia Company of London was assembling Jamestown supply mission of nine ships, which included the Virginia and Sea Venture.

Ahead of this flotilla was Samuel Argall and the Mary and John, who departed England in May. According to records, this voyage was partially financed by a merchant of the name John Cornelis (or "Cornelius") who desired a shipment of fish. Captain Argall and shipmaster Robert Tyndall departed Portsmouth, England, with an additional mission to find a shorter route to the New World. While a "southern passage" using the trade winds would take a few months, a more direct westerly route by the Mary and John proved the journey could be done in less than ten weeks.

Francisco Fernández de Écija, captain of the Spanish La Asunsión de Cristo (a small zabra, an inshore exploration vessel), was tasked with the "matter of Virginia", to gather information on the English colony's strength. In Chesapeake Bay, the Mary and John intercepted the smaller ship and prevented it from entering the James River and discovering the status of Jamestown.

The Mary and John returned to England by October, 1609.

== 1630 voyage ==
In 1630, the Mary and John was captained by Thomas Chubb and the company was led by Roger Ludlow, one of the Assistants of the Massachusetts Bay Company, who was accompanied by Edward Rossiter, another Assistant to the Company.

The ship had three decks for its passengers, livestock, and cargo. She became part of what was later known as the Great Migration. The colonists were recruited by the Reverend John White of Dorchester, Dorset. Nearly all of the passengers originated in the West Country counties of Somerset, Dorset, Devon, and the West Country towns of Dorchester, Bridport, Crewkerne, and Exeter. The ship sailed on March 20, 1629/30, under the command of a Capt. Squeb or Squibb, from Plymouth, England, with 140 emigrants on board.

After an uneventful passage they arrived in Nantasket, near present-day Hull, Massachusetts, on May 30. They arrived two weeks before the first ships (Arbella and three escorts) from the Winthrop Fleet, a group of 11 ships led by John Winthrop which carried about 1000 Puritans along with livestock and provisions from England to New England during the summer of 1630. While Mary and John were not formally part of the Winthrop Fleet, John Winthrop knew of their voyage. In a letter to his wife he sent before leaving Southampton, John Winthrop wrote about Mary and John's intended destination, which may have indicated approval of their voyage as fellow emigrants within his jurisdiction.

The passengers initially founded Dorchester, Massachusetts. The voyage, along with an 11-ship flotilla led by John Winthrop that departed England in April 1630, greatly strengthened the two-year-old Massachusetts Bay Colony. In late 1635, about 2/3 of the passengers relocated to Connecticut, led by Thomas Hooker, where they were principal founders of the Connecticut River farming community of Windsor, Connecticut, and participated in the organization of the first Connecticut colonial government in early 1639 Fundamental Orders of Connecticut in participation with Hartford and Wethersfield, CT.

=== Notable passengers ===
While a contemporary passenger list has never been found, researchers from the "Mary and John Clearinghouse" have established a list of known, probable, and possible passengers. A number of the passengers played significant roles in the founding of the nation. They include:

- Roger Clapp
- Roger Ludlowe
- John Mason, Deputy Governor of the Connecticut Colony
- William Rockwell Church Deacon and founder of both Dorchester, Massachusetts, and Windsor, Connecticut
- William Gaylord, Church Deacon and founder of both Dorchester, Massachusetts, and Windsor, Connecticut
- John Gilbert co-founder of Taunton, Massachusetts. Married Edward Rossiter's widowed sister.
- Samuel Maverick
- William Phelps founder of both Dorchester, Massachusetts, and Windsor, Connecticut, and foreman of the first grand jury in New England.
- Nicholas Upsall, one of the first freemen in colonial America
- Matthew Grant and wife Priscilla, ancestors of Ulysses S. Grant and his father Jesse Root Grant
- Richard Bidwell, and his son John Bidwell, originating possibly from County Devon in England, who left the Dorchester settlement in Boston to travel with the Connecticut party, eventually co-founding Hartford, CT
- Simon Mills I, co-founder of Windsor, Connecticut. Crossed the Atlantic with his older brother John, who died during the journey. The Mills come from a military family known in England as early as the Crusaders in A.D.1080, as lineage is recorded from Domesday Book
- John Gallop
- Jonathan Gillet Co-founder of Windsor, Connecticut and ancestor of Frederick Huntington Gillett and John Elbert Gillette
- Henry Wolcott and wife Elizabeth (Saunders), grandparents of Roger Wolcott, 13th governor of Connecticut.
- William Thrall, One of the first settlers of Dorchester, Massachusetts.

== 1634 voyage ==
The second trip of Mary and John to colonial America began shortly after March 24, 1633/4, in Southampton. The master was Robert Sayres (or Sayers). A number of the passengers played significant roles in the founding of the nation. They include:

- Nicholas Easton, Governor of Rhode Island
- James Barker; his father, James Barker Sr. died at sea during the same voyage.
- James Noyes, founder of Newbury, Massachusetts, and whose son James Noyes II was one of the founders of Yale University.
- Nicholas Noyes, his son, also Nicholas Noyes, served as the chaplain to the Connecticut Regiment during the Great Swamp Fight and served as the presiding minister at the Salem Witch Trials.

== Sources ==
- Marshall, Edward Chauncey (1869). The ancestry of General Grant, and their contemporaries. Sheldon & Company, New York.
- McFeely, William S. (1981). Grant: A Biography. W.W. Norton. ISBN 0-393-01372-3.
