= Plymouth Company =

Division of the Virginia Company

Virginia Company of Plymouth
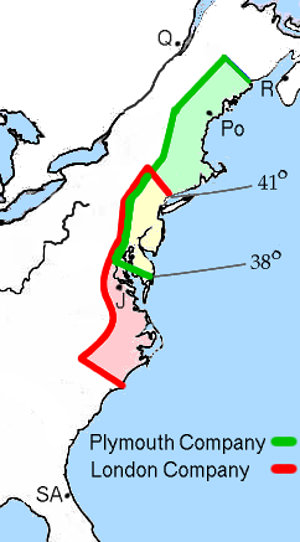
- The 1606 grants by James I to the London and Plymouth companies. The overlapping area (yellow) was granted to both companies on the condition that neither found a settlement within 100 miles (160 km) of the other. Jamestown is noted by "J." The Spanish settlement of Saint Augustine, the French settlements of Québec and Port-Royal, and Popham are also shown
- Trade name: Plymouth Company
- Industry: Maritime transport, trade
- Founded: (10 April 1606; 420 years ago) at Westminster, England
- Founder: James I
- Defunct: 24 May 1624
- Fate: Dissolved following transformation of areas into crown colony
- Headquarters: London, England
- Area served: New England
- Products: Cash crops, timber
- Parent: Virginia Company

The Plymouth Company, officially known as the London Company of Plymouth, was a company chartered by King James in 1606 along with the London Company of Virginia with responsibility for colonizing the east coast of America between latitudes 38° and 45° N.

== History ==
The Plymouth Company was funded by wealthy investors from Plymouth, Bristol, and Exeter such as Sir John Popham and Sir Ferdinando Gorges. Competition between the two branches with overlapping territory was intended to motivate efficient settlement, but only the Virginia Company succeeded in establishing a permanent colony.

The Virginia Company emerged at a time when European empires chartered corporations for their imperial efforts. The English East India Company and Dutch East India Company had both recently received royal charters by their governments. The Virginia Company represented a new strategy that relied less on protected trade and ports: settler colonialism. Many of these early colonists sought to establish lasting communities with political institutions, as developed in Jamestown.

The merchants (with George Popham named in the patent) agreed to finance the settlers’ trip in return for repayment of their expenses plus interest out of the profits made. The Plymouth Company established the one-year Popham Colony in present-day Maine in 1607, the northern answer to Jamestown Colony. Two ships, the Gift of God and Mary and John, arrived in August 1607 with around 100 settlers. The colony was led by George Popham, nephew of Sir John Popham, and Raleigh Gilbert, nephew of Sir Walter Raleigh.

== Decline ==
Popham Colony fared better than Jamestown in the cold winter of 1607, and their president, George Popham, was the only colonist who died. Fifty colonists returned to England that December. Leadership fell to second-in-command Raleigh Gilbert for six months, until a supply ship in autumn 1608 brought news that he had inherited a title and land in England following his brother's death. The ship also brought news about the death of Sir John Popham, a major investor in the Plymouth Company. When Gilbert left for England on the returning ship, the discouraged colonists followed him, abandoning Popham Colony.

Beyond crises of leadership, the colony faced poor relationships with local Native Americans and were unable to trade with nearby tribes. The colony was also burdened with few natural resources to exploit and few skilled workers to take advantage of them. Even their time of arrival, two months later than the settlers of Jamestown, gave them less time to prepare for the harsh Maine winter. Unlike Jamestown, colonists abandoned Popham Colony before they found a resource or product to profit from. They did, however, produce the first ship built by English colonists in the Americas, the Virginia of Sagadahoc. Despite failing to establish a permanent settlement, the knowledge of local peoples and geography proved useful for future colonial endeavors under the Council for New England.

The Popham Colony was abandoned in 1608. In 1620, after years of disuse, the Plymouth Company was revived and reorganized as the Plymouth Council for New England with a new charter, the New England Charter of 1620. The Plymouth Company had 40 patentees at that point, and established the Council for New England to oversee their efforts, but it stopped operating in 1624.

The Council for New England was not dissolved until 1635 and issued several patents after 1624, including one to John Mason for New Hampshire and to New Plymouth Colony with the Bradford patent of 1630.

== See also ==
- Ferdinando Gorges
