= Ludlow, Vermont =

Ludlow, Vermont, may refer to:

- Ludlow (town), Vermont
- Ludlow (village), Vermont
