= Virginia Company of London =

Division of the Virginia Company

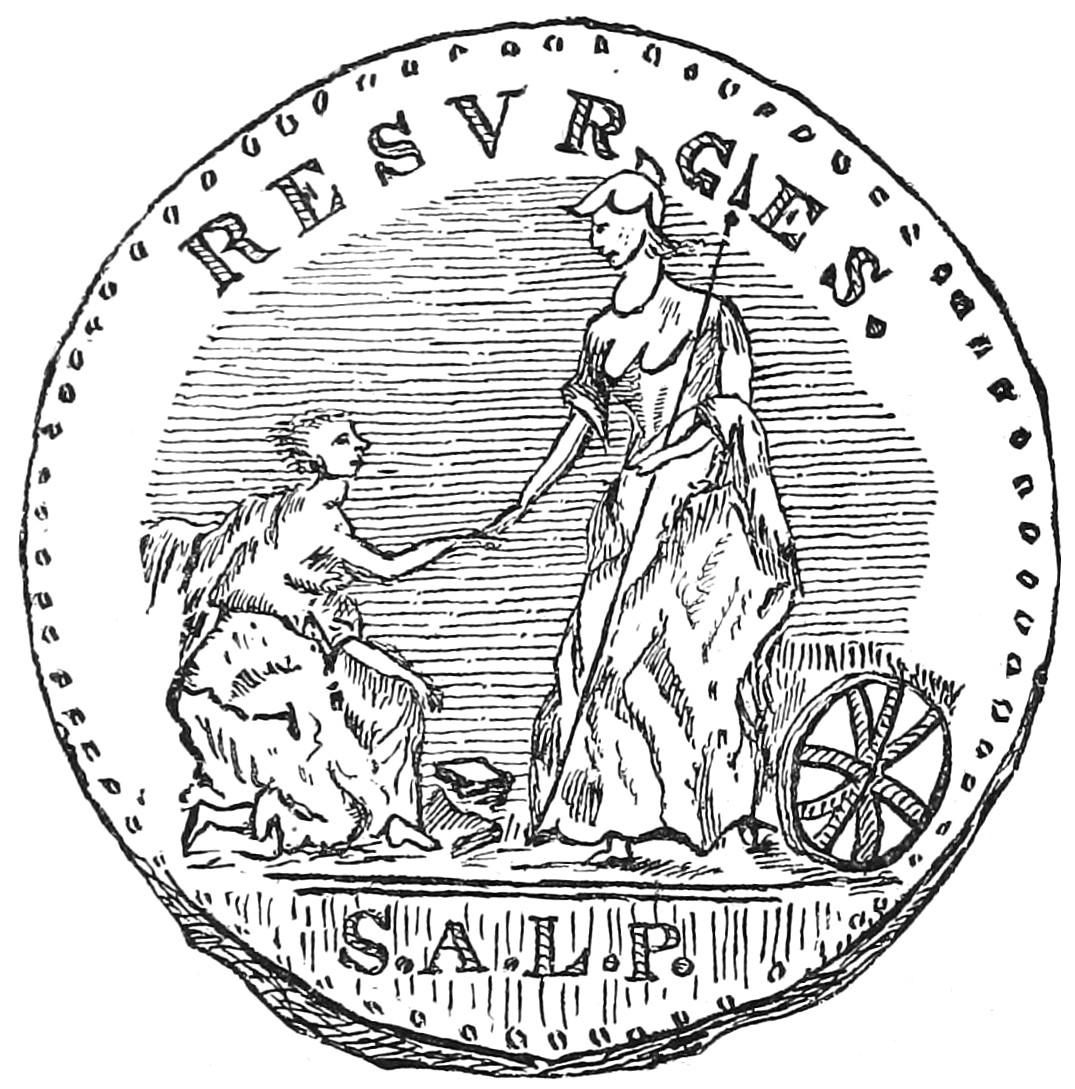
- Original seal of the London Company of Virginia
- Trade name: Virginia Company of London
- Type: Division of the Virginia Company
- Industry: Maritime transport, trade
- Founded: (10 April 1606; 420 years ago) at Westminster, England
- Founder: James I
- Defunct: 24 May 1624
- Fate: Dissolved
- Headquarters: London, England
- Area served: Virginia
- Products: Cash crops, timber, tobacco
- Parent: Virginia Company

The Virginia Company of London (sometimes called "London Company") was a division of the Virginia Company with responsibility for colonizing the east coast of North America between latitudes 34° and 41° N.

== History ==
=== Origins ===
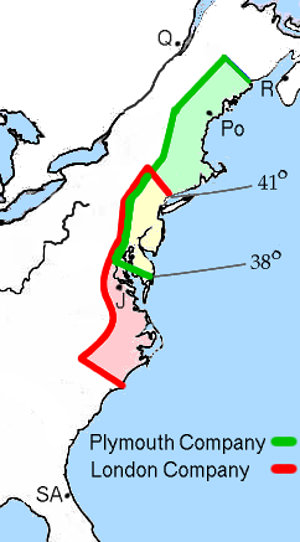
The 1606 grants by James I to the Virginia and Plymouth companies. The overlapping area (yellow) was granted to both companies on the condition that neither found a settlement within 100 miles (160 km) of the other. Jamestown is noted by "J." The Spanish settlement of Saint Augustine, the French settlements of Québec and Port-Royal, and Popham are also shown

The territory granted to the Virginia Company of London included the eastern coast of North America from the 34th parallel at Cape Fear north to the 41st parallel in Long Island Sound. As part of the Virginia Company and Colony, the Virginia Company of London owned a large portion of Atlantic and inland Canada. The company was permitted by its charter to establish a 100-square-mile (260 km^{2}) settlement within this area. The portion of the company's territory north of the 38th parallel was shared with the Plymouth Company, with the stipulation that neither company found a colony within 100 miles (161 km) of the other.

The Virginia Company of London made landfall on 26 April 1607, at the southern edge of the mouth of the Chesapeake Bay, which they named Cape Henry, near present-day Virginia Beach. Deciding to move the encampment, on 4 May 1607 they established the Jamestown Settlement on the James River about 40 miles (64 km) upstream from its mouth at the Chesapeake Bay. Later in 1607, the Plymouth Company established its Popham Colony in present-day Maine, but it was abandoned after about a year. By 1609, the Plymouth Company had dissolved. As a result, the charter for the Virginia Company of London was adjusted with a new grant that extended from "sea to sea" of the previously shared area between the 38th and the 40th parallels. It was amended in 1612 to include the new territory of the Somers Isles (or Bermuda).

The Virginia Company of London struggled financially, especially with labor shortages in its Virginia colony. Its profits improved after sweeter strains of tobacco than the native variety were cultivated and successfully exported from Virginia as a cash crop beginning in 1612. By 1619 a system of indentured service was fully developed in the colony; the same year the home government passed a law that prohibited the commercial growing of tobacco in England. In 1624, the company lost its charter, and Virginia became a royal colony.

A spin-off, The Virginia Company of London of The Somers Isles (fully the Company of the City of London for the Plantation of The Somers Isles, but generally referred to as the Somers Isles Company), operated until 1684.

In Renaissance England, wealthy merchants were eager to find investment opportunities, so they established several companies to trade in various parts of the world. Each company was made up of investors, known as "adventurers", who purchased shares of company stock. The Crown granted a charter to each company with a monopoly to explore, settle, or trade with a particular region of the world. Profits were shared among the investors according to the amount of stock that each owned. More than 6,300 Englishmen invested in joint-stock companies between 1585 and 1630, trading in Russia, Turkey, Africa, the East Indies, the Mediterranean, and North America.

=== Founding ===
Investors in the Virginia Company hoped to profit from the natural resources of the New World. In 1606 Captain Bartholomew Gosnold obtained from King James I a charter for two companies. The first, the Virginia Company of London (now known generally as the "Virginia Company of London"), covered what is now Maryland, Virginia and Carolina, between latitude 34° and latitude 41° north. Gosnold's principal backers were Sir Thomas Gates, Sir George Somers, Edward Wingfield and Richard Hakluyt.

The second company, the Plymouth Company of London (today known as the "Plymouth Company"), was empowered to settle as far as 45° North, encompassing what is present-day Pennsylvania, New Jersey, New York, and New England.

The company paid all the costs of establishing each colony, and in return controlled all land and resources there, requiring all settlers to work for the company.

The first leader of the Virginia Company in England was its treasurer, Sir Thomas Smythe, who arranged the 1609 charter. He had been governor of the East India Company since 1603 and continued with one break until 1620.

In an extensive publicity campaign, Wingfield, Gosnold and a few others, circulated pamphlets, plays, sermons and broadsides throughout England to raise interest in New World investments. Investors could buy stock individually or in groups. Almost 1,700 people purchased shares, including men of different occupations and classes, wealthy women, and representatives of institutions such as trade guilds, towns and cities. Proceeds from the sale of stock were used to help finance the costs of establishing overseas settlements, including paying for ships and supplies and recruiting and outfitting laborers. A single share of stock in the Virginia Company cost 12 pounds 10 shillings, the equivalent of more than six months' wages for an ordinary working man.

The largest single investor was Thomas West, Lord de la Warre, who served as the first governor of Virginia between 1610 and 1618. (The English colonists named the Delaware River and Native American Lenape tribe, called the Delaware Indians, after him.)

The business of the company was the settlement of the Virginia colony, supported by a labor force of voluntary transportees under the customary indenture system. In exchange for 7 years of labor for the company, the company provided passage, food, protection, and land ownership (if the worker survived).

=== First expedition ===
In December 1606, the Virginia Company's three ships, containing 105 men and boys as passengers and 39 crew members, set sail from Blackwall, London and made landfall on 26 April 1607 at the southern edge of the mouth of what they named the James River on the Chesapeake Bay. They named this shore Cape Henry. They were attacked by Native Americans, and the settlers moved north. On 14 May 1607, these first settlers selected the site of Jamestown Island, further upriver and on the northern shore, as the place to build their fort.

In addition to survival, the early colonists were expected to make a profit for the owners of the Virginia Company. Although the settlers were disappointed that gold did not wash up on the beach and gems did not grow in the trees, they realized there was great potential for a wealth of other kinds in their new home. Early industries, such as glass manufacture, pitch and tar production for naval stores, and beer and wine making took advantage of natural resources and the land's fertility. From the outset, settlers thought that the abundance of timber would be the primary leg of the economy, as Britain's forests had long been felled. The seemingly inexhaustible supply of cheap American timber was to be the primary enabler of England's (and then Britain's) rise to maritime (merchant and naval) supremacy. However, the settlers could not devote as much time as the Virginia Company would have liked to developing commodity products for export. They were too busy trying to survive.

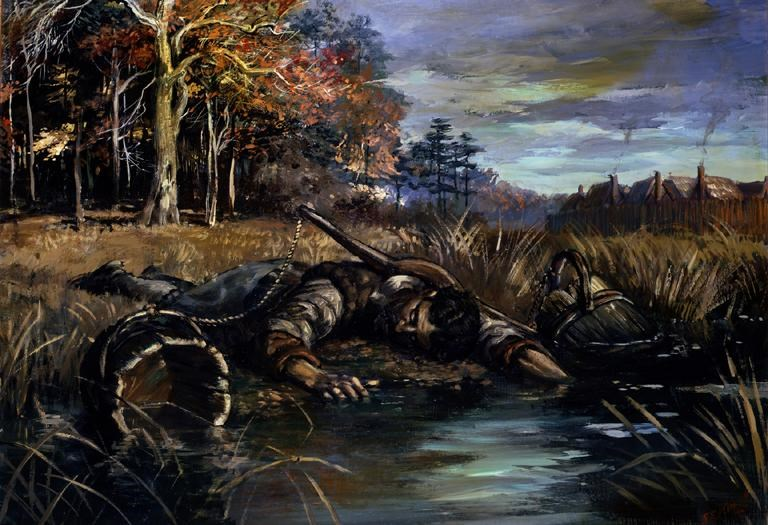
Jamestown settler dead in the swamp. Painting by Sydney King of the US National Park Service.

Within the three-sided fort erected on the banks of the James, the settlers quickly discovered that they were, first and foremost, employees of the Virginia Company of London, following instructions of the men appointed by the company to rule them. In exchange, the laborers were armed (though gunpowder was stored separately at the powder magazine, to be distributed in definite quantities monthly for hunting purposes, or by a high order in case of other necessity, otherwise the settlers were forbidden to store gunpowder at home) and received clothes and food from the common store. After seven years, they were to receive land of their own. The gentlemen, who provided their armor and weapons, were to be paid in land, dividends, or additional shares of stock.

Initially, the colonists were governed by a president and a seven-member council selected by the King. Leadership problems quickly erupted. Jamestown's first two leaders coped with varying degrees of success with sickness, assaults by Native Americans, poor food and water supplies, and class strife. Many colonists were ill-prepared to carve out a new settlement on a frontier. When Captain John Smith became Virginia's third president, he proved the strong leader that the colony needed. Industry flourished and relations with Chief Powhatan's people improved.

=== Instructions ===
After so many failed colonizing attempts in the 16th century such as the Roanoke Colony, and with the ascension of King James to the throne of England on 24 March 1603, the effort to colonize was renewed, but this time in the form of joint-stock companies, which did not involve the king's treasury, also known as the public treasury. Thus it became, from a royal perspective at least, a largely risk-free endeavor. Although a profit-driven enterprise, the king was motivated by international rivalry and the propagation of religion, and the individuals who ventured to the New World were motivated by a chance to improve their economic and social standing.

Thus King James awarded a patent to a group of investors which included detailed instructions for everything from where to place watchmen and with how many, to where to plant. It instructed Christopher Newport, captain of the Susan Constant, and Bartholomew Gosnold, captain of the Godspeed and leader of the expedition of three ships, on their duties upon reaching the land they named Virginia. There were no instructions for administration or governance.

=== The Charter of 1606 ===
The First Virginia Charter established provisions for the governance of the colony. It was to be governed by a colonial council, which proved ineffective. A governor, Lord De La Warr, was dispatched in 1610 to provide firmer governance of the colony. The council back in London whose directives and interests Lord De La Warr represented was composed of knights, gentlemen and merchants who had invested in the company. This charter also limited the jurisdiction of the Virginia Company of London to 100 miles from the seaboard and from 38 degrees to 45 degrees latitude north.

=== Charter of 1609 ===
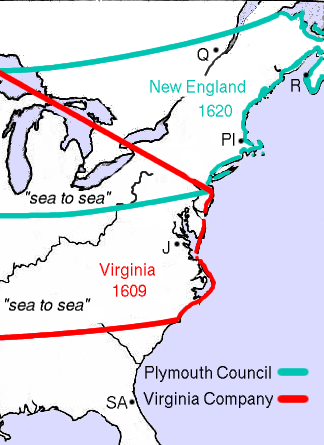
The 1609 grant to the Virginia Company of London "from sea to sea" is shown demarcated in red. The later grant to the Plymouth Council of New England is shown in green.

In 1609, the Virginia Company received its Second Charter, which allowed the company to choose its new governor from among its shareholders. Investment boomed as the company launched an intensive recruitment campaign. Over 600 colonists set sail for Virginia between March 1608 and March 1609.

Sir Thomas Gates, Virginia's deputy governor, bound for the colony in the Third Supply aboard the Sea Venture, was shipwrecked in Bermuda, along with the admiral of the company, Sir George Somers, Captain Newport, and 147 other settlers and seamen. When Gates finally arrived to take up his new post in 1610, with most of the survivors of the Sea Venture (on two new ships built in Bermuda, the Deliverance and the Patience), he found that only 60 of the original 214 colonists had survived the infamous "Starving Time" of 1609–1610. Most of these were dying or ill. Despite the abundance of food which Gates' expedition brought from Bermuda (which had necessitated the building of two ships), it was clear the colony was not yet self-sufficient and could not survive.

The survivors of Jamestown were taken aboard the Deliverance and the Patience, and the colony was abandoned. Gates intended to transport all the settlers back to England, but the fortuitous arrival of another relief fleet, bearing Governor Lord De la Warre, granted Jamestown a reprieve. All the settlers were put ashore again, and Sir George Somers returned to Bermuda aboard the Patience to obtain more food. (Somers died there, and his nephew, Matthew Somers, the captain of the Patience, sailed the vessel to Lyme Regis in England instead, to claim his inheritance.)

=== Charter of 1612 ===
The third Virginia Charter or Charter of 1612, was essentially the same as the Charter of 1609, with the difference being territorial jurisdiction, expanding it to the Atlantic Islands such as Bermuda. In "domestic correspondence" written by John Chamberlain to The Right Honorable Sir Dudley Carlton, Knight, His Maties [read: Majesty's] Ambassador at Venice dated 12 February 1612, Chamberlain wrote:

2. There is a lotterie in hand for the furthering of the Virginia viage, and an vnder companie erecting for the trade of the Bermudas, wch have changed theyre name twise within this moneth, beeing first christned Virginiola as a member of that plantation, but now lastly resoued to be called Sommer Islands, as well in respect of the continuall temperat ayre, as in remembrance of Sr George Sommers that died there.

This is also quoted in Bermuda under the Sommer Islands Company 1612–1684 by A. C. Hollis Hallett:

The contemporary letter-writer and social commentator, John Chamberlain, wrote that the Islands were "first christened Virginiola as a member of [the Virginia] plantation, but now lately resolved to be called Sommer Islands, as well in respect of the continual temperate air, as in remembrance of Sir George Sommers that died there".

Administration of the Somers Isles, alias Islands of Bermuda, was in fact transferred in 1615 to a spin-off of the Virginia Company of London titled the Company of the City of London for the Plantacion of The Somers Isles, which administered that colony until losing its royal charter in 1684. Bermuda remained strongly linked to Virginia (the nearest English territory to it until Carolina Colony was settled from Bermuda in 1670 under William Sayle); however, until the American War of Independence, when rebel General George Washington of Virginia would address a letter to the people of Bermuda seeking their aid in the war:

To THE INHABITANTS OF THE ISLAND OF BERMUDA

Camp at Cambridge 3 Miles from Boston, September 6, 1775.

Gentn: (In the great Conflict, which agitates this Continent, I cannot doubt but the Assertors of Freedom and the Rights of the Constitution, are possessed of your most favorable Regards and Wishes for Success. As Descendents of Freemen and Heirs with us of the same Glorious Inheritance, we flatter ourselves that tho' divided by our Situation, we are firmly united in Sentiment; the Cause of Virtue and Liberty is Confined to no Continent or Climate, it comprehends within its capacious Limits, the Wise and good, however dispersed and separated in Space or distance.) You need not be informed, that Violence and Rapacity of a tyrannick Ministry, have forced the Citizens of America, your Brother Colonists, into Arms; We equally detest and lament the Prevalence of those Councils, which have led to the Effusion of so much human Blood and left us no Alternative but a Civil War or a base Submission. The wise disposer of all Events has hitherto smiled upon our virtuous Efforts; Those Mercenary Troops, a few of whom lately boasted of Subjugating this vast Continent, have been check'd in their earliest Ravages and are now actually encircled in a small Space; their Arms disgraced, and Suffering all the Calamities of a Siege. The Virtue, Spirit, and Union of the Provinces leave them nothing to fear, but the Want of Ammunition, The applications of our Enemies to foreign States and their Vigilance upon our Coasts, are the only Efforts they have made against us with Success. Under those Circumstances, and with these Sentiments we have turned our Eyes to you Gentlemen for Relief, We are informed there is a very large Magazine in your Island under a very feeble Guard; We would not wish to in volve you in an Opposition, in which from your Situation, we should be unable to support you: – We knew not therefore to what Extent to sollicit your Assistance in availing ourselves of this Supply; – but if your Favor and Friendship to North America and its Liberties have not been misrepresented, I persuade myself you may, consistent with your own Safety, pro mote and further this Scheme, so as to give it the fairest prospect of Success. Be assured, that in this Case, the whole Power and Execution of my Influence will be made with the Honble. Continental Congress, that your Island may not only be Supplied with Provisions, but experience every other Mark of Affection and Friendship, which grateful Citizens of a free Country can bestow on its Brethren and Benefactors. I am &c.

By this Charter, neither the stock issue of 1609 nor the authorized lottery system mitigated the shortage of cash flow.

=== The "Great Charter" ===
This was an ordinance and constitution that proceeded from a set of instructions issued in 1618 to the governor and the Council of Virginia known as An Ordinance and Constitution of the Virginia Company in England on 24 July 1621. This document replaced military law with common law, and provided for land ownership for settlers living in the colony. It is also of great significance for it provides governance independent of the Crown. An assembly took place in a church composed of Governor Sir George Yeardley and 22 select men representing seven regions. They then organized into a legislative body, establishing a precedent for self-governance, a pivotal point in American history.

=== Collapse and dissolution ===
After 1620, with growing demand for tobacco on the continent, the company arranged to sell Virginia tobacco in the Netherlands, but the next year and despite company pleas to maintain the privilege of freedom of trade, the Privy Council forbade the export of any product of Virginia to a foreign country until the commodities had been landed in England, and English duties had been paid. By 1621, the company was in trouble; unpaid dividends and increased use of lotteries had made future investors wary. The company debt was now over £9,000. Worried Virginians were hardly reassured by the advice of pragmatic Treasurer Edwin Sandys who warned that the company "cannot wish you to rely on anything but yourselves". In March 1622, the company's and the colony's situation went from dire to disastrous when, during the Indian massacre of 1622, the Powhatan confederacy killed one-quarter of the European population of the Virginia colony.

When the Crown and company officials proposed a fourth charter, severely reducing the company's ability to make decisions in the governing of Virginia, subscribers rejected it. King James I forthwith changed the status of Virginia in 1624, taking control of it as a royal colony to be administered by a governor appointed by the King. However, the government's colonial policy of export restrictions did not change. The Crown approved the election of a Virginia Assembly in 1627. This form of government, with governor and assembly, would oversee the colony of Virginia until 1776, excepting only the years of the English Commonwealth.

Bermuda had been separated from the Virginia Company in 1614, when the Crown briefly took over its administration. In 1615, the shareholders of the Virginia Company created a new company, the Somers Isles Company, which continued to operate Bermuda. It was subsequently, also known officially as The Somers Isles (for the Admiral of the Virginia Company, Sir George Somers) until being dissolved in 1684 and made a royal colony. Meetings were held at town hall to discuss the distribution of the tobacco.

== Native American relationships ==
The instructions issued to Sir Thomas Gates, on 20 November 1608, called for a forcible conversion of Native Americans to Anglicanism and their subordination to the colonial administration. The records of the company record a discussion during one of its first meetings about publishing a justification of their business enterprise methods to "give adventurers, a clearness and satisfaction", a public debate where Catholics and neutrals might attack them. Whereas Catholic arguments would be in support of Spanish legal claims to the New World under the Treaty of Tordesillas, it was feared that the neutral "pen-adversaries" might "cast scruples into our conscience" by "criticising the lawfulness of the plantation." It was decided to forego such a publication of a justification.

In 1608, Sir Edward Coke, in his capacity as Lord Chief Justice, offered a ruling in Calvin's Case that went beyond the issue at hand: whether a Scotsman could seek justice at an English Court. Coke distinguished between aliens from nations at war with England and friendly aliens, those from nations in league with England. Friendly aliens could have recourse to English courts. But he also ruled that with "all infidels" (i.e. those from non-Christian nations), there could be no peace, and a state of perpetual hostility would exist between them and Christians.

In 1609, the company issued instructions to settlers to kidnap Native American children so as to educate them with English values and religion. These instructions also sanctioned attacking the Iniocasoockes, the cultural leaders of the local Powhatans. Only after Thomas West, 3rd Baron De La Warr arrived in 1610, was the company able to commence a war against the Powhatan with the First Anglo-Powhatan War. De La Warr was replaced by Sir Thomas Dale, who continued the war, which continued until a truce was made with the marriage of Pocahontas to John Rolfe in 1614.

The military offensive was accompanied by a propaganda war: Alderman Robert Johnson published Nova Britannia, in 1609, which compared Native Americans to wild animals—"heardes of deere in a forest". While it did portray the Powhatan as peace-loving, it threatened to deal with any who resisted conversion to Anglicanism as enemies of their country. (Johnson was the son-in-law of Sir Thomas Smythe, treasurer of the company in London and leader of its "court" faction.)

The company began to turn a profit after 1612, when planting a couple of new varieties of tobacco yielded a product that appealed more to English tastes than the native tobacco. Tobacco became the commodity crop of the colony, and settlers were urged to cultivate more. The colony struggled with labor shortages as mortality was high.

In 1622, the Second Anglo-Powhatan War erupted. Its origins are disputed. English apologists for the company say that Opchanacanough initiated the war. Robert Williams, a 21st-century Native American law professor, argues that Opchanacanough had secured concessions from Governor Yeardley which the company would not accept. Thus, Opchanacanough's attack, on 18 April 1622, may have been a pre-emptive attempt to defeat the colony before reinforcements arrived.

In about a day, the Powhatan killed 350 of 1,240 colonists, destroying some outlying settlements. The Virginia Company quickly published an account of this attack. It was steeped in Calvinist theology of the time: the massacre was the work of Providence in that it was justification for the destruction of the Powhatan, and building English settlements over their former towns. New orders from the Virginia Company of London directed a "perpetual war without peace or truce" "to root out from being any longer a people, so cursed a nation, ungrateful to all benefitte, and incapable of all goodnesses". Within two years, the Crown took over the territory in 1624 as a royal colony.

== See also ==
- Somers Isles Company
- List of trading companies
