= Virginia Company =

English trading company

The Virginia Company
- Coat of arms

- Banner
- Trade name: Virginia Company
- Type: Public
- Industry: Maritime transport, trade
- Founded: 10 April 1606; 420 years ago at Westminster, England
- Founder: James I
- Defunct: 24 May 1624
- Fate: Dissolved following transformation of Virginia into a royal colony
- Headquarters: London, England
- Area served: Virginia and Somers Isles
- Products: Cash crops, timber, tobacco
- Divisions: London Company; Plymouth Company

The Virginia Company was an English trading company chartered by King James I on 10 April 1606 with the objective of colonizing the eastern coast of America. The coast was named Virginia, after Elizabeth I, and it stretched from present-day Maine to the Carolinas. The company's shareholders were Londoners, and it was distinguished from the Plymouth Company, which was chartered at the same time and composed largely of gentlemen from Plymouth, England.

The biggest trade breakthrough resulted after the adventurer and colonist John Rolfe introduced several sweeter strains of tobacco from the Caribbean. These yielded a more appealing product than the harsh-tasting tobacco native to Virginia. Cultivation of Rolfe's new tobacco strains produced a strong commodity crop for export for the London Company and other early English colonies and helped to balance a national trade deficit with Spain. The company failed in 1624, following the widespread destruction of the Great Massacre of 1622 by indigenous peoples in the colony, which devastated the English population. On 24 May, James dissolved the company and made Virginia a royal colony from England with propertied male colonists retaining some representative-government through the lower house, the House of Burgesses.

== History ==
=== The Plymouth Company ===
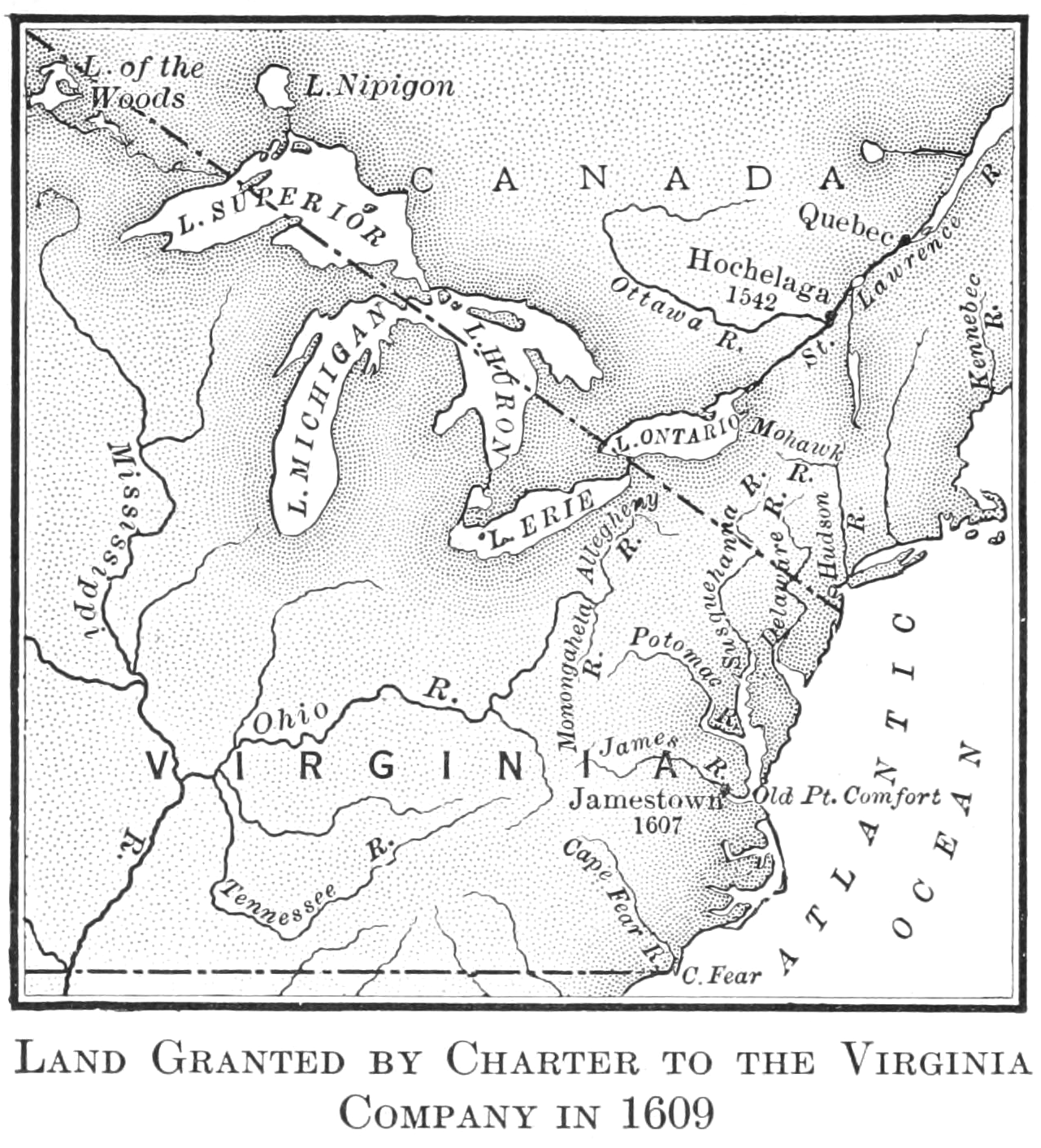
The charter boundaries in 1609

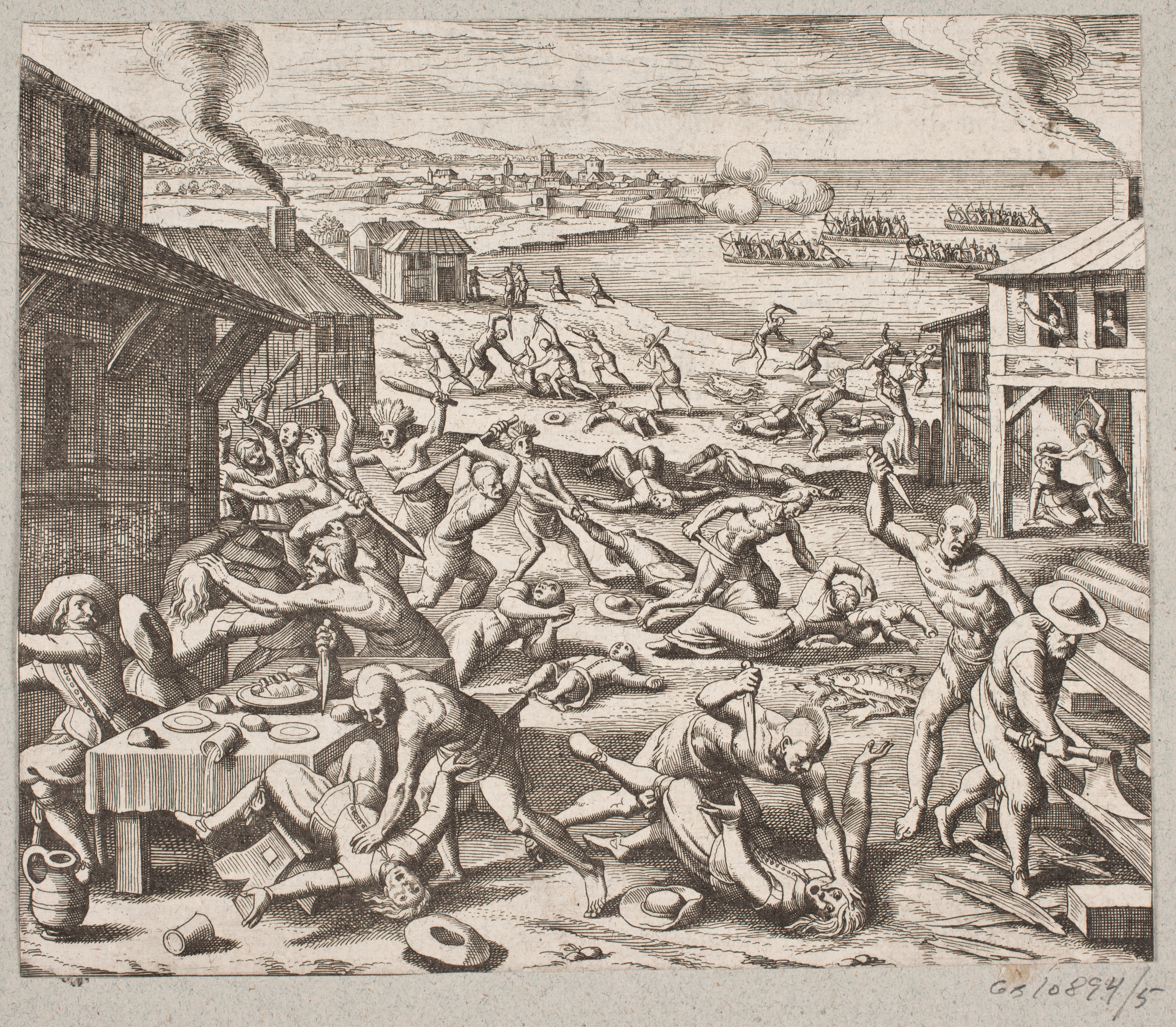
The Indian massacre of 1622

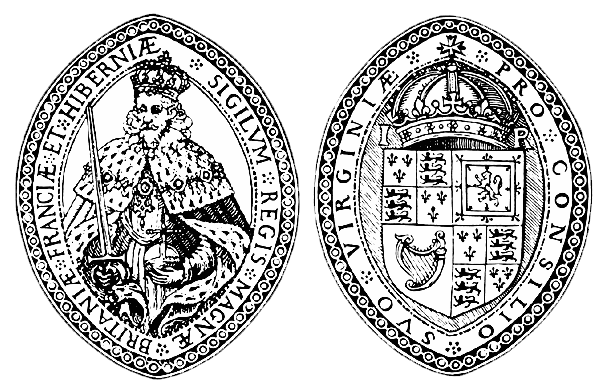
The obverse and reverse of the royal seal of James I of England as the president of the Council of Virginia, the inscriptions signifying: "Seal of the King of Great Britain, France and Ireland"; "For his Council of Virginia" (c. 1606)

In 1606, a ruling council was held in London composed of major shareholders in the enterprise. The members were nominated by the company and appointed by James. The council in England then directed the settlers to appoint their own local council, which proved ineffective. The council had to obtain approval from London for expenditures and laws, and limited the enterprise to 100 square miles.

The Charter of 1606 did not mention a Virginia Company or a Plymouth Company; these names were applied somewhat later to the overall enterprise. The Charter of 1609 stipulates two distinct companies:

that they should divide themselves into two colonies, the one consisting of divers Knights, gentlemen, merchants and others of our cittie of London, called the First Collonie; and the other of sondrie Knights, gentlemen and others of the cities of Bristol, Exeter, the town of Plymouth, and other places, called the Second Collonie.

By the terms of the charter, the London Company was permitted to establish a colony of 100 miles square between latitudes 34° and 41° N, approximately between Cape Fear and Long Island Sound. It also owned a large portion of inland Canada. The company established the Jamestown Settlement in present-day Jamestown, Virginia on 14 May 1607, about 40 miles inland along the James River, a major tributary of the Chesapeake Bay in present-day Virginia. In 1620, George Calvert asked James for a charter for English Catholics, so the territory could be added to the Plymouth Company.

The Plymouth Company was permitted to establish settlements between latitudes 38° and 45° N, roughly between the upper reaches of the Chesapeake Bay and the U.S.-Canada border. On 13 August 1607, the Plymouth Company established the Popham Colony along the Kennebec River in Maine. However, it was abandoned after about a year and the Plymouth Company became inactive. A successor company eventually established a permanent settlement in 1620 when the Pilgrims arrived in Plymouth, Massachusetts, aboard the Mayflower.

The Second Charter expanded the area of the enterprise from sea to sea and appointed a governor, because the local councils had proven ineffective. Governor Thomas West, 3rd Baron De La Warr (known as Lord Delaware) sailed for America in 1610. James delegated the governor of Virginia absolute power.

Also in 1609, a much larger Third Supply mission was organized. A new purpose-built ship named the Sea Venture was rushed into service without the customary sea trials. She became the flagship of a fleet of nine ships, with most of the leaders, food, and supplies aboard. Aboard the Sea Venture were fleet Admiral George Somers, Vice-Admiral Christopher Newport, Virginia Colony governor Sir Thomas Gates, William Strachey, and businessman John Rolfe with his pregnant wife.

The third supply convoy encountered a hurricane that lasted three days and separated the ships from one another. The Sea Venture was leaking through its new caulking, and Admiral Somers had it driven aground on a reef to avoid sinking, saving 150 men and women but destroying the ship. The uninhabited archipelago was officially named "The Somers Isles" after Admiral Somers. The survivors built two smaller ships from salvaged parts of the Sea Venture, which they named Deliverance and Patience.

Ten months later, they continued on to Jamestown, arriving on 23 May 1610. They left several men behind on the archipelago to establish possession of it. At Jamestown, they found that more than 85-percent of the 500 colonists there had perished during the "Starving Time". The Sea Venture passengers had anticipated finding a thriving colony and had brought little food or supplies with them. The colonists at Jamestown were saved only by the timely arrival three weeks later of a supply mission headed by Thomas West, 3rd Baron De La Warr, better known as "Lord Delaware".

The Virginia Company of London failed to discover gold or silver in Virginia, to the disappointment of its investors. However, they did establish trade of various types. The company benefitted from lotteries held throughout England until they were cancelled by the Crown. The company even considered titles of nobility to gain support for the colony.

In February 1613, company projects were promoted at court when the lawyer Richard Martin helped produce The Memorable Masque of the Middle Temple and Lincoln's Inn at Whitehall Palace for the wedding of Princess Elizabeth and Frederick V of the Palatinate. The masque represented Virginian peoples on the stage and also introduced the theme of gold mining.

In 1612, the company's charter was officially extended to include the Somers Isles as part of the Virginia Colony. However, the isles passed to the London Company of the Somers Isles in 1615, which had been formed by the same shareholders as the London Company. The third charter expanded territory eastward to include Summer Islands and other islands.

On 18 November 1618, Virginia Company officers Thomas Smythe and Edwin Sandys sent a set of instructions to Virginia governor George Yeardley, which are often referred to as "The Great Charter", though it was not issued by James. This charter gave the colony self-governance, which led to the establishment of a Council of State appointed by the governor and an elected General Assembly (House of Burgesses), and provided that the colony would no longer be financed by shares but by tobacco farming. The birth of representative government in the United States can be traced from this Great Charter, as it provided for self-governance from which the House of Burgesses and a General Council were created.

The indigenous peoples had grown increasingly resistant to the competition from the colonists and mistreatment at their hands. They rose in what is known as Jamestown Massacre of 1622, also known as the Great Massacre, which decimated the population. Survivors of some eighty plantations gathered into eight near Jamestown. In England, company officers debated over guarding the original charter, or deciding to disband the company. The Jamestown Massacre brought unfavorable attention to the colony, particularly from James who had originally chartered the company.

There was a period of debate in England between company officers who wished to guard the original charter, and those who wanted the company to be disbanded. On 24 May 1624, James dissolved the company and made Virginia a royal colony.

== Arms ==
Coat of arms of the Virginia Company
Notes The arms of the Virginia Company consist of: Crest On a wreath of the colors a maiden queen couped below the shoulders proper, her hair dishevelled, vested and crowned with an Eastern crown Or. Escutcheon Argent, a Saint George's Cross Gules between four escutcheons, each regally crowned proper, the first escutcheon in the dexter chief, the arms of France and England quarterly; the second in the sinister chief, the arms of Scotland; the third the arms of Ireland; the fourth as the first. Supporters Two men in complete armor with their bevors (visors) open, on their helmets three ostrich feathers Argent, each charged on the breast with a cross throughout Gules, and each holding a lance proper in his exterior hand.

== See also ==
- List of trading companies
