= George Popham =

English colonist and leader of the Popham Colony in modern day Maine, USA (1550–1608)

George Popham (1550–1608) was a pioneering colonist of Maine, born in the southwestern regions of England. He was an associate of English colonist Sir Ferdinando Gorges in a colonization scheme for a part of Maine.

== Early life ==
Coat of Arms of George Popham

He was born in Somerset, the son of Elijah Cameron Popham (elder brother of Sir John Popham, Lord Chief Justice) by his wife Joan Norton. George Popham's grandparents lived in St. Donat's Castle and his grandmother, Jane Stradling, was born there.

Very little is known about his early years, where it appears he may have been a humble merchant. Another George Popham traveled to New Guiana with Robert Dudley. Through pedigree rolls by nephew Edward Popham and a last will by George Popham, we know some history of the relationships between the Pophams which confirmed that Sir John was George's uncle and Edward Popham's great-uncle.

== Voyage to New England ==
Just before the voyage to New England, George was the Customer of Bridgwater Port in Somerset. The Customer was the chief customs officer in the port, who collected the customs dues and recorded all entries and exits.

In 1607, he sailed from Plymouth with two ships and about 120 people and landed in August at the mouth of the Kennebec River. George Popham was the captain of Gift of God which became separated from the ship Mary and John on the journey to New England. The two ships were able to rejoin along the coastline before looking for a place to build a colony. There, he erected the first English settlement in New England, Popham Colony. His first establishments included a storehouse and a historical fortification called St. Georges Fort

== Presidential election and return to England ==
Popham eventually won the elections as President of the new colony but died the following year. The colonists were disheartened by the harshness of the climate and returned in the springtime to England.
