= Popham Colony =

English colony in present-day US

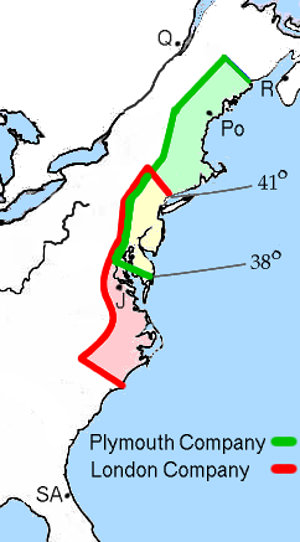
The site of the 1607 Popham Colony in present-day Maine is shown by "Po" on the map. The settlement at Jamestown is shown by "J".

The Popham Colony—also known as the Sagadahoc Colony—was a short-lived English colonial settlement in North America. It was established in 1607 by the proprietary Plymouth Company and was located in the present-day town of Phippsburg, Maine, near the mouth of the Kennebec River. It was founded a few months after its more successful rival, the colony at Jamestown.

The Popham Colony was the second colony in the region that would eventually become known as New England. The first colony was St. Croix Island, near what is now the town of Calais. (St. Croix Island was settled initially in June 1604, then moved in 1605 by Samuel de Champlain to Port Royal). Popham was abandoned after only 14 months, apparently more due to the death of patrons and the first colony president than lack of success in the New World. The loss of life of the colonists in 1607 and 1608 at Popham was far lower than that experienced at Jamestown.

The first ocean-going ship built by the English in the New World was completed during the year of the Popham Colony and was sailed back across the Atlantic Ocean to England. The pinnace, named Virginia of Sagadahoc, was apparently quite seaworthy, and crossed the Atlantic again successfully in 1609 as part of Sir Christopher Newport's nine-vessel Third Supply mission to Jamestown. The small Virginia survived a powerful three-day storm en route which was thought to have been a hurricane and which wrecked the mission's large new flagship Sea Venture on Bermuda.

The exact site of the Popham Colony was lost until 1888 when a plan entitled "The Draught of St Georges fort" was found in Simancas, Spain. This plan exactly matches the location at Sabino Head near Maine's Popham Beach State Park. Later archaeology in 1994 confirmed the location and the accuracy of the plan. The site is listed on the National Register of Historic Places.

== History ==
=== Founding ===
Popham was a project of the Plymouth Company, which was one of the two competing parts of the proprietary Virginia Company that King James chartered in 1606 to raise private funds from investors in order to settle Virginia. At the time, the name "Virginia" applied to the entire east coast of North America from Spanish Florida to New France in modern-day Canada. That area was technically under the claim of the Spanish crown, but was not occupied by the Spanish.

The Plymouth Company was granted a royal charter and the rights to the coast between 38° and 45° N; the rival London Company was granted the coast between 34° and 41° N. The colonists were to plant first within their respective non-overlapping areas; the overlapping area between 38° and 41° would then go to the first company that proved "strong enough" to colonize it.

=== Colonists ===
The first Plymouth Company ship, Richard, sailed in August 1606, but the Spanish intercepted and captured it near Florida in November.

The next attempt was more successful. About 120 colonists (all men and boys) left Plymouth on May 31, 1607, in two ships. They intended to trade precious metals, spices, furs, and show that the local forests could be used to build English ships. George Popham was president of the colony and captain of Gift of God. Raleigh Gilbert—son of Sir Humphrey—was admiral (second in command) of the colony and captain of Mary and John. Neither of these men was a mariner and the ship's officers of Mary and John were Robert Davies and James Davis. The ship's log and diary from the voyage and first 6 weeks of the colony is the main contemporary source of the information about the Popham Colony. (It was called "Popham" after its principal financial backer, Sir John Popham.) The diary is kept in Lambeth Museum in London. James Davis was later made captain of the ship built by the colonists, Virginia, which made at least two voyages across the Atlantic. Robert and James were most likely from a family of mariners from Devon, England.

Sir John Popham was the Lord Chief Justice of England, while Gilbert was the son of Sir Humphrey Gilbert and half-nephew of Sir Walter Raleigh. Other financiers included Sir Ferdinando Gorges, the military governor of Plymouth. Much of the information about the events in the colony comes from his letters and memoirs. Settlers included the Reverend Richard Seymour, grandson of Edward Seymour, 1st Duke of Somerset, the brother of Queen Jane Seymour. Nine council members and six other gentlemen accompanied the expedition, while the rest were soldiers, artisans, farmers and traders.

In August they arrived at Pemaquid, returning a native, Skidwarres, who had been captured by George Weymouth in 1605. The Gift of God arrived at the mouth of the Kennebec River (then called the Sagadahoc River) on August 13, 1607. The Mary and John arrived three days later. They quickly began construction of large star-shaped Fort St. George.

=== Fort St. George ===
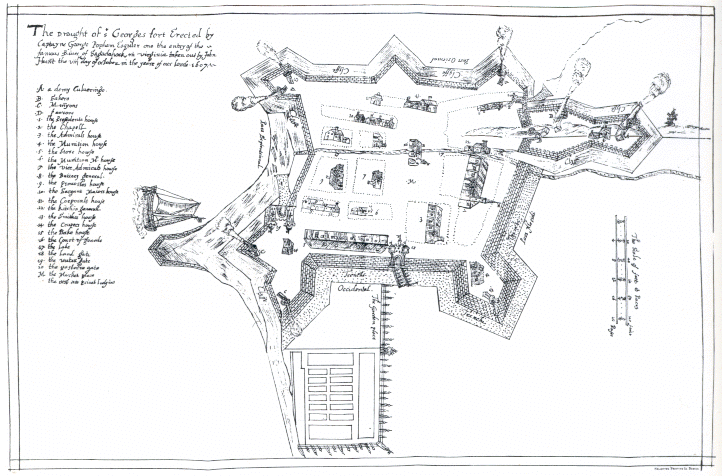
John Hunt's map

Fort St. George, named for the patron saint of England, was built on the headland of an area named Sabino, ten miles (16 km) south of what is now Bath, Maine, in the town of Phippsburg.

On October 8, 1607, colonist John Hunt drew a plan of the colony. Hunt was listed in the colony's register as "draughtsman". His plan, titled "The draught of St Georges fort Erected by Captayne George Popham Esquier", was a surveyed and detailed picture-map showing a star-shaped fort, with ditches and ramparts, and with 18 buildings, including the admiral's house, a chapel, a storehouse, a cooperage, and a guardhouse. At Fort St. George it shows nine guns that ranged in size from demi-culverin to falcon. The plan was drafted when work on the site was just beginning, so it is unclear how much was actually built.

As a result of espionage, Hunt's map was sold to the Spanish ambassador to England, Pedro de Zúñiga y de la Cueva. The map then passed to King Philip III of Spain, in 1608. In 1888, it was discovered in the Spanish General Archives in Simancas, having gone unnoticed by historians for nearly three centuries.

Fort St. George was abandoned after 14 months of occupation. Most of the site is privately owned, but part of it is within the Fort Baldwin State Historic Site. Between 1994 and 2013 a number of archaeological explorations were done at the site. Archaeological excavations show some but not all of the buildings in the plan, and shallow ditches where defensive trenches are shown on the plan. No stonework was found, but many of the defenses are based on the natural geography.

=== Troubles begin ===
Popham and Gilbert sent survey expeditions up the river and west across Casco Bay and contacted the Abenaki, an Indian tribe belonging to the Algonquian peoples of northeastern North America. In a letter to the King, Popham wrote that the natives had told them that the area was full of easily exploitable resources. However, the colony failed to establish cooperation with the tribe.

Late summer arrival meant that there was no time to farm for food. With inadequate supplies, half of the colonists returned to England in December 1607 aboard the Gift of God and almost starved on the return trip and had to sell their cargo in the Azores. Others faced a cold winter during which the Kennebec River froze. Historical records indicate that fire destroyed parts of the storehouse and its provisions, but archaeological excavations indicate that other buildings were burned and not the storehouse. George Popham died on February 5, 1608. He is the only colonist known to have died (in contrast to Jamestown which lost half its population that year) although the Abenaki claimed that they killed eleven colonists and set fire to the site. Raleigh Gilbert became president of the colony at the age of 25.

The colonists completed one major project: the building of a 30-ton ship, a pinnace they named Virginia. It was the first English ocean-going ship built in the Americas. The primary purpose of Virginia was for use in exploration of the area, but was later refitted and some of the colonists returned to England in it when the colony was abandoned. This was the beginning of a 400-year shipbuilding legacy in the Bath, Maine area.

In May 1608 a supply ship brought a message that Sir John Popham had died. The supply ship returned to England with a cargo. When Mary and John returned in September 1608, it brought news that Gilbert's elder brother John had died. Gilbert thus inherited the title and the estate of Compton Castle in Devon. He decided to return to England and as no other leader was found, the colony decided to disband and the remaining colonists sailed home in Mary and John and Virginia. (The Virginia would make at least one more Atlantic crossing, going to Jamestown the next year with the Third Supply, piloted by Captain James Davis.)

The colony lasted just 14 months. It is likely that the failure of the colony was due to multiple problems: the lack of financial support after the death of Sir John Popham, the inability to find another leader, the cold winter, and finally the hostility of both the native people and the French. Sir Francis Popham (son of Sir John) tried several times to reestablish the colony, but was unable to get the financial backing. The settlement of New England was delayed until it was taken up by refugees instead of adventurers.

=== Later developments ===
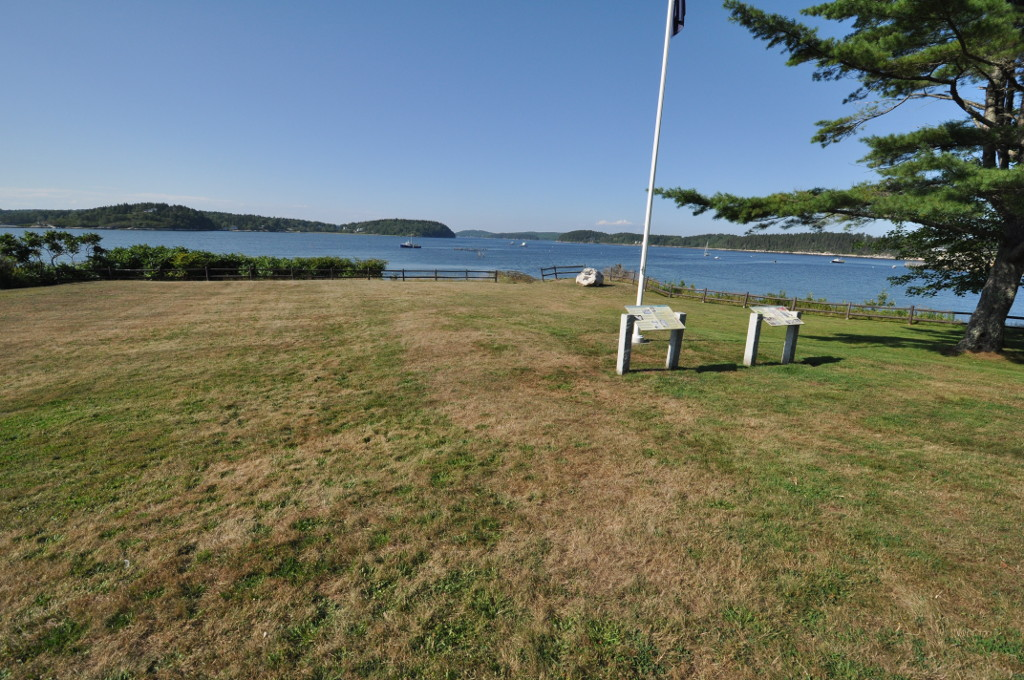
Site of Fort George in 2018

French colonist Jean de Biencourt with Father Pierre Biard visited the abandoned site in 1611. In 1624, Samuel Maverick also visited the site and reported that it was "overgrown" but garden herbs could still be seen. In the 18th century the site was divided into farmland and several houses were built on the site.

During the American Civil War, the Union army built Fort Popham in the area, directly on the Kennebec River at the mouth of Atkins Bay (about 500 meters east of the Popham Colony site). In 1905 the U.S. Army built Fort Baldwin on Sabino Head just west of the site, but parts of the site were used for transport and storage. The state of Maine bought some of the area in 1924. Fort Baldwin was reactivated during World War II. After the war, Fort Baldwin was returned to the state of Maine and is now part of the Fort Baldwin State Historic Site. Much of the Popham Colony Site is privately owned.

== Modern excavations ==
The first excavations of the area in the 1960s were unsuccessful. In 1994, Jeffrey Brain of the Peabody Essex Museum confirmed the site of the colony using Hunt's plan as a guide, and confirmed the accuracy of the plan. He began a larger excavation in 1997 and later uncovered the Admiral's house, the storehouse and a liquor storage building. He also proved that Hunt's map was very accurate for those buildings which were actually built. Parts of the fort, probably including the chapel and graveyard, lie on private property not open for digging and the fort's southern portion is under a public road. One major find in the later excavations was that iron smelting had been done in the Popham Colony, presumably using local bog iron. This might have been the earliest iron smelting in what is now the United States. The excavation was concluded in 2013.

== Sources and further reading ==
- Richard L. Pflederer, "Before New England: The Popham Colony," History Today, January 2005
- Tom Gidwitz, "The Little Colony That Couldn't," Archaeology magazine, March/April 2006
- Jeffrey Phipps Brain, Fort St. George: Archaeological Investigation of the 1607-1608 Popham Colony, Maine State Museum, 2007. ISBN 978-0-935447-19-4.
- Jeffrey Phipps Brain, Fort St. George II: Additional Archaeological Investigation of the 1607-1608 Popham Colony, Maine State Museum, 2016
- Peter H. Morrison, Architecture of the Popham Colony, 1607-1608: An Archaeological Portrait of English Building Practice at the Moment of Settlement, M.A. thesis, The University of Maine, December 2002, accessed 2009-11-12
- John Wingate Thornton, Colonial Schemes of Popham and Gorges : Speech at the Fort Popham Celebration, August 29, 1862, 1863
