= Full-rigged pinnace =

Type of ship in use in the 16th and 17th centuries

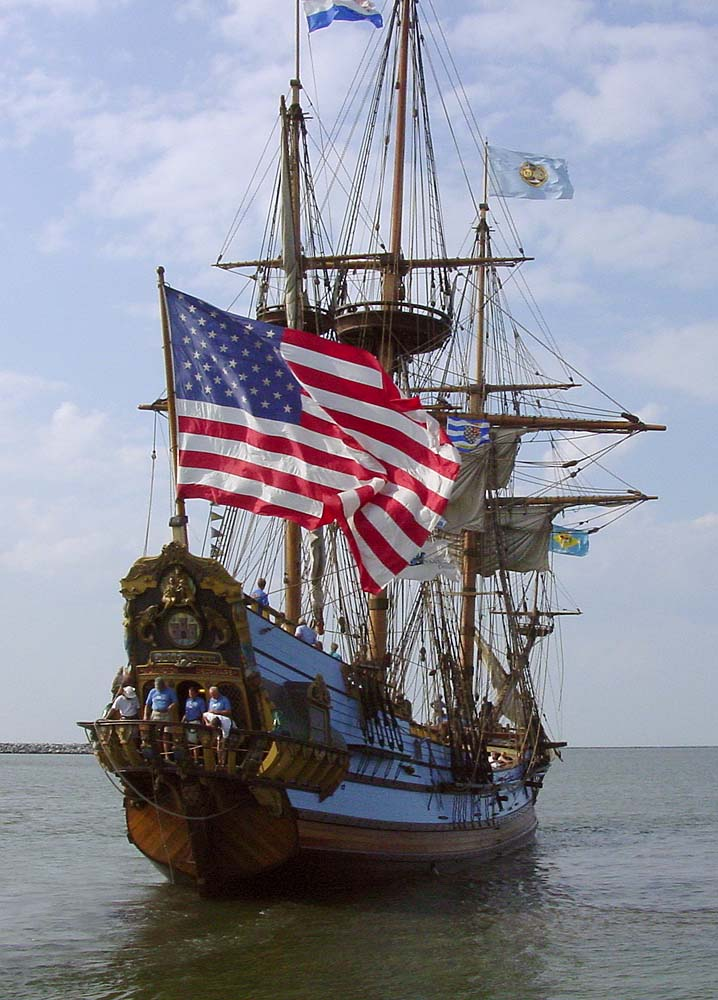
A replica of the Kalmar Nyckel, an example of a full-rigged type of pinnace

The full-rigged pinnace was the larger of two types of vessel called a pinnace in use from the sixteenth century.

== Etymology ==
The word pinnace, and similar words in many languages (as far afield as Malaysia, where the boat "pinas" took its name from the Malay pinas), came ultimately from the Spanish pinaza c. 1240, from pino (pine tree), from the wood of which the ships were constructed. The word came into English from the Middle French pinasse.

== Design ==
The pinnace is perhaps the most confusing of all the early seventeenth-century types of vessels. Pinnace was more of a use than a type name, for almost any vessel could have been a pinnace or tender to a larger one. Generally speaking, pinnaces were lightly built, single-decked, square-sterned vessels suitable for exploring, trading, and light naval duties. On equal lengths, pinnaces tended to be narrower than other types. Although primarily sailing vessels, many pinnaces carried sweeps for moving in calms or around harbors.

The rigs of pinnaces included the single-masted fore-and-aft rig with staysail and sprit mainsail to the mainmast, and a square sprit-sail under the bowsprit; however pinnaces were also built with a two-masted rig or with a three-masted "ship" rig. Open square-sterned pulling boats were also called pinnaces at least as early as 1626. The larger pinnace 'type' was often much larger than the smaller tender type, and frequently carried enough cannon to be considered an (armed) merchantman, or fast and maneuverable small warship.

== Pinnaces ==
The English pinnace Sunne was the first vessel reported built at the Chatham Dockyard, in 1586. English pinnaces of the time were typically of around 100 tons, and carried 5 to 16 guns.

The Dutch built pinnaces during the early 17th century. Dutch pinnaces had a hull form resembling a small race-built galleon and usually rigged as a ship (square rigged on three masts), or carrying a similar rig on two masts (in a fashion akin to the later "brig"). Pinnaces were used as fast merchant vessels, pirate vessels and small warships. Not all were small vessels, some being nearer to larger ships in tonnage.

This type saw widespread use in northern waters, as they had a shallow draught. In 2009 the wreck of an Elizabethan English pinnace with a set of twelve matched cannon was discovered, the first of its type for the time. Vessels at that time typically carried a mixture of unmatched cannon using disparate ammunition. The matched armament is considered revolutionary, and a contributing factor to the deadly reputation of the English naval artillery.

The first English ship built in North America, Virginia of Sagadahoc, was a pinnace.
