= Phippsburg, Maine =

Town in Maine, United States

- Town
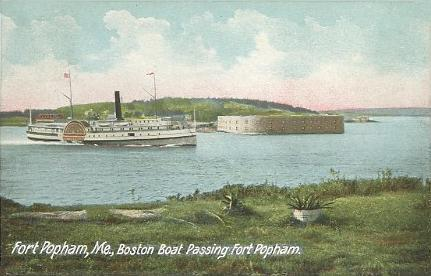
- Fort Popham

- Seal

- Location within Maine Location within the United States
- Coordinates: 43°48′02″N 69°50′48″W
- Country: United States
- State: Maine
- County: Sagadahoc
- Incorporated: January 26, 1814

Government
  - Type: Town Meeting-Selectmen

Area
  - Total: 71.20 sq mi (184.41 km^{2})
  - Land: 28.58 sq mi (74.02 km^{2})
  - Water: 42.62 sq mi (110.39 km^{2})
- Elevation: 7 ft (2.1 m)

Population (2020)
  - Total: 2,155
  - Density: 75/sq mi (29.1/km^{2})
- Time zone: UTC−5 (Eastern (EST))
  - Summer (DST): UTC−4 (EDT)
- ZIP Codes: 04562 (Phippsburg); 04565 (Sebasco Estates)
- Area code: 207
- FIPS code: 23-58515
- GNIS feature ID: 582675
- Website: phippsburg.com

Phippsburg is a town in Sagadahoc County, Maine, United States, on the west side of the mouth of the Kennebec River. The population was 2,155 at the 2020 census. It is within the Portland-South Portland-Biddeford metropolitan area. A tourist destination, Phippsburg is home to Bates-Morse Mountain Conservation Area, Fort Popham State Historic Site; it is also home to Fort Baldwin which overlooks Fort Popham, and Popham Beach State Park, as well as Pond Island National Wildlife Refuge. The town includes part of Winnegance.

== History ==
As the site of the Popham Colony, Phippsburg was—between 1607 and 1608—the first known English settlement attempt in New England. During its brief existence, colonists built Virginia of Sagadahoc, the first ship in Maine's long history of shipbuilding.

The next British settlement at the mouth of the Kennebec River began in 1653; Thomas Atkins, a fisherman, purchased from the sachem Mowhotiwormet, commonly called Chief Robinhood, the southern end of Phippsburg (with the exception of Popham). Atkins Bay bears his name. The population gradually increased until King Philip's War. Dwellings were burned and stocks of cattle killed. The entire area was abandoned.

Resettlement commenced in 1679 at Newtown, located on the southern end of Arrowsic Island (across the river from present-day Phippsburg Center). About 1684, Francis Small had a trading post at Cape Small, which bears his name. But in 1689 the area was again destroyed and deserted during King William's War. With the Treaty of Portsmouth in 1713, conflict was formally ended between the Abenaki and English settlements. In 1714, Newtown was reestablished, then incorporated in 1716 as Georgetown-on-Arrowsic by the Massachusetts General Court. Also in 1716, the Pejepscot Proprietors established a little fishing village called Augusta at the Small Point Harbor area of Phippsburg. Dr. Oliver Noyes, director of the colony, erected a stone fort 100 feet (30 meters) square to protect it. In 1717, Governor Samuel Shute held a conference at Georgetown-on-Arrowsic with tribal delegates, who arrived in a flotilla of canoes and encamped on Lee Island.

But in summer of 1723 during Dummer's War, the Norridgewocks and 250 of their Indian allies from Canada, incited by the French missionary Sebastien Rale, attacked the area. Again it was deserted, with the stone fort destroyed. Governor William Dummer's Treaty of 1725 restored peace, and in 1737 an attempt was made to resettle Cape Small Point. The boundaries of Georgetown-on-Arrowsic were enlarged to encompass most of present-day Phippsburg, Bath (which then included West Bath), Woolwich and Georgetown.

Slow resettlement of the Phippsburg peninsula found ten farms along the Kennebec River by 1751, with five more on the Casco Bay side. But the districts gathered into Georgetown-on-Arrowsic began splitting away; in 1759, Woolwich withdrew, followed in 1781 by Bath. In 1814, Phippsburg was set off and incorporated. The original petition requested that it be named Dromore after one of the town's oldest sections, but Massachusetts chose instead to honor one of its royal governors, Sir William Phips—actually a native of Woolwich.

Between 1842 and 1890, wooden ships were built at Phippsburg. It also had numerous tidal mills.

Fort Popham was built during the Civil War to guard the mouth of the Kennebec, on the site of a much smaller battery built in 1808. It became the control center for an underwater minefield in the 1890s. The more modern Fort Baldwin was built between 1905 and 1912 and was garrisoned in both World Wars.

In 1891 Phippsburg ceded Ragged Island to Harpswell, but in 1917 it further added to its roster of islands by annexing nine Casco Bay islands including Bushy, Hen, Bear, Malaga, Burnt Coat, Black Snake, Wood, Little Wood, and Gooseberry Islands. Malaga was later offered to, but refused by, Harpswell.

During the Gilded Age, Popham Beach developed into a resort area, with steamboats transporting excursionists from Bath. Today, the town's principal industries are fishing and tourism.

In 1971, Phippsburg was the site of the discovery of the Spirit Pond runestones, purported evidence of pre-Columbian European exploration of North America, but now shown to be a modern hoax. The three stones were found by Walter J. Elliot, Jr., a carpenter from Bath, Maine. The runestones are now in the possession of the Maine State Museum in Augusta, Maine.

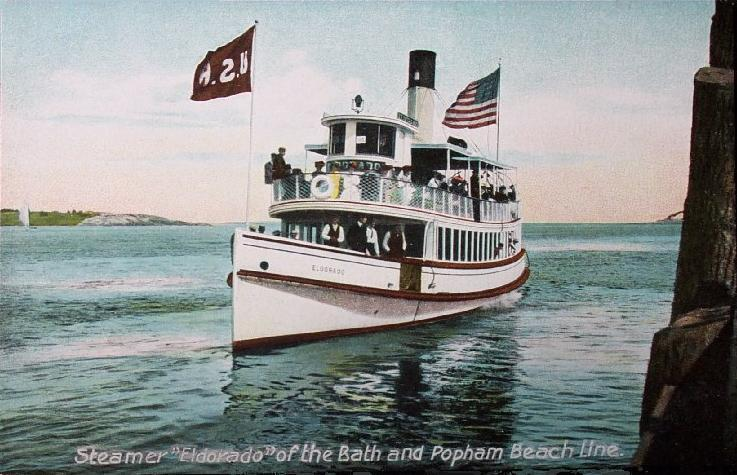
Popham Beach steamer, c. 1910

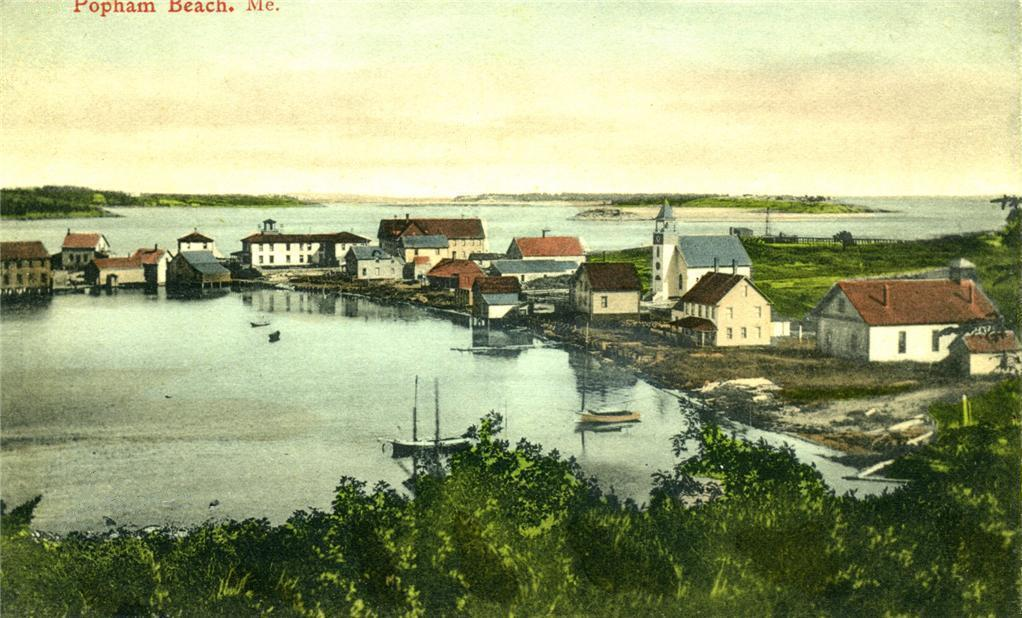
View of Popham Beach in 1906

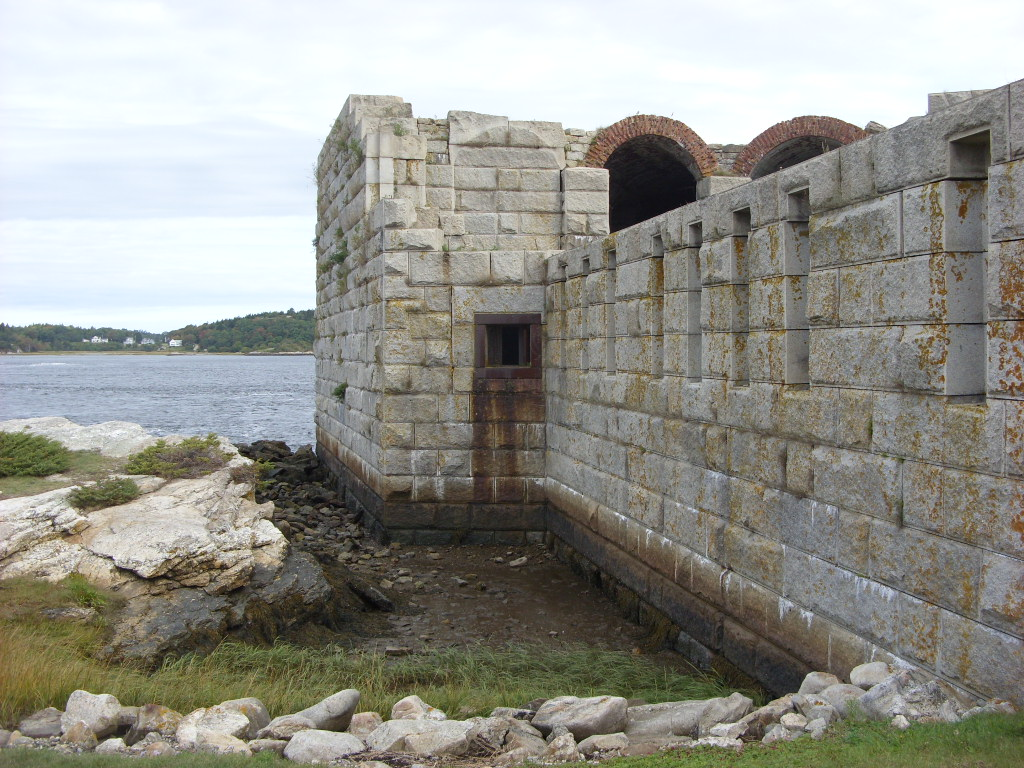
Fort Popham

== Geography ==
According to the United States Census Bureau, the town has a total area of 71.20 square miles (184.41 km^{2}), of which 28.58 square miles (74.02 km^{2}) is land and 42.62 square miles (110.39 km^{2}) is water. Connected to Bath by a bridge and causeway over Winnegance Creek and sharing a border with West Bath to the east of Winnegance, Phippsburg is on a peninsula dividing the Kennebec River from Casco Bay in the Gulf of Maine, part of the Atlantic Ocean.

Phippsburg is crossed by state routes 209 and 216. Separated by water, the peninsula is near the towns of Harpswell to the west, West Bath to the northwest, Bath to the north, Arrowsic to the northeast, and Georgetown to the east.

== Demographics ==
Historical population
Census	Pop.	Note	%±
1820	1,119		—
1830	1,311		17.2%
1840	1,657		26.4%
1850	1,805		8.9%
1860	1,770		−1.9%
1870	1,344		−24.1%
1880	1,497		11.4%
1890	1,396		−6.7%
1900	1,254		−10.2%
1910	1,079		−14.0%
1920	872		−19.2%
1930	801		−8.1%
1940	1,020		27.3%
1950	1,134		11.2%
1960	1,121		−1.1%
1970	1,229		9.6%
1980	1,527		24.2%
1990	1,815		18.9%
2000	2,106		16.0%
2010	2,216		5.2%
2020	2,155		−2.8%
U.S. Decennial Census

=== 2010 census ===
As of the census of 2010, there were 2,216 people, 963 households, and 665 families living in the town. The population density was 77.5 inhabitants per square mile (29.9/km^{2}). There were 1,748 housing units at an average density of 61.2 per square mile (23.6/km^{2}). The racial makeup of the town was 97.5% White, 0.5% African American, 0.3% Native American, 0.3% Asian, 0.1% from other races, and 1.4% from two or more races. Hispanic or Latino of any race were 1.0% of the population.

There were 963 households, of which 22.8% had children under the age of 18 living with them, 58.5% were married couples living together, 6.5% had a female householder with no husband present, 4.0% had a male householder with no wife present, and 30.9% were non-families. Of all households 24.0% were made up of individuals, and 9.1% had someone living alone who was 65 years of age or older. The average household size was 2.30 and the average family size was 2.67.

The median age in the town was 49.8 years. 16.5% of residents were under the age of 18; 6.1% were between the ages of 18 and 24; 19.4% were from 25 to 44; 36.5% were from 45 to 64; and 21.5% were 65 years of age or older. The gender makeup of the town was 50.3% male and 49.7% female.

=== 2000 census ===
As of the census of 2000, there were 2,106 people, 859 households, and 622 families living in the town. The population density was 73.0 inhabitants per square mile (28.2/km^{2}). There were 1,554 housing units at an average density of 53.8 per square mile (20.8/km^{2}). The racial makeup of the town was 98.53% White, 0.28% African American, 0.24% Native American, 0.24% Asian, and 0.71% from two or more races. Hispanic or Latino of any race were 0.57% of the population.

There were 859 households, out of which 28.5% had children under the age of 18 living with them, 62.5% were married couples living together, 5.7% had a female householder with no husband present, and 27.5% were non-families. Of all households 21.8% were made up of individuals, and 8.8% had someone living alone who was 65 years of age or older. The average household size was 2.45 and the average family size was 2.82.

In the town, the population was spread out, with 22.4% under the age of 18, 5.3% from 18 to 24, 26.5% from 25 to 44, 30.7% from 45 to 64, and 15.1% who were 65 years of age or older. The median age was 43 years. For every 100 females, there were 105.9 males. For every 100 females age 18 and over, there were 101.7 males.

The median income for a household in the town was $46,739, and the median income for a family was $53,631. Males had a median income of $33,214 versus $26,250 for females. The per capita income for the town was $22,205. About 5.8% of families and 9.2% of the population were below the poverty line, including 8.8% of those under age 18 and 14.4% of those age 65 or over.

== Sites of interest ==
- Fort Baldwin
- Fort Popham
- Malaga Island
