= Fiddler's Reach Fog Signal =

- U.S. National Register of Historic Places
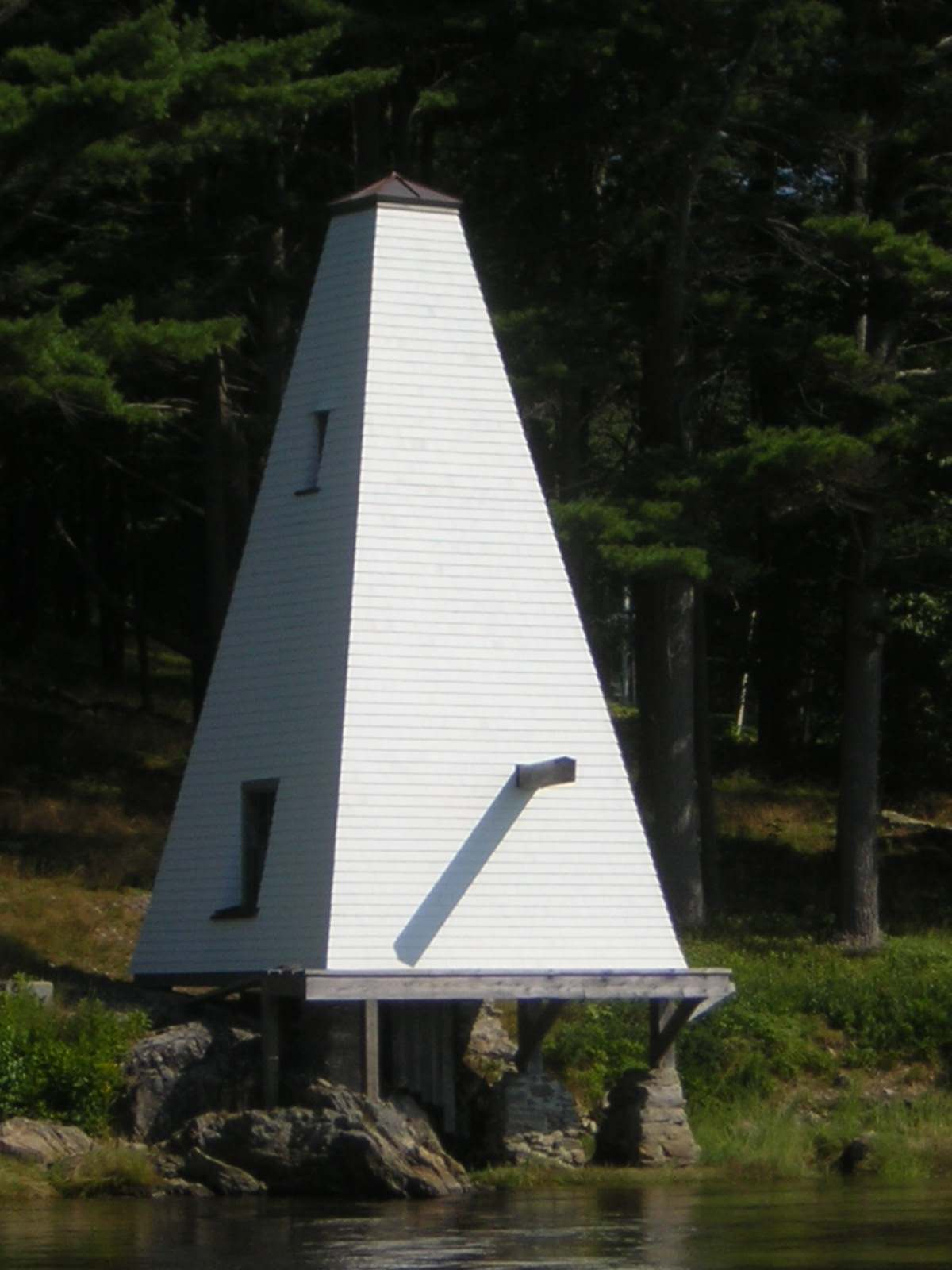
- Restored, in August 2009, lacking bell to hang from projecting beam

- Location within Maine
- Location: N. shore of Kennebec River, E. of Doubling Point Light Station, Arrowsic, Maine
- Coordinates: 43°52′53.8″N 69°47′57.5″W
- Area: 0.13 acres (0.053 ha)
- NRHP reference No.: 09000594
- Added to NRHP: August 5, 2009

The Fiddler's Reach Fog Signal is a fog signal station located on the Kennebec River in Arrowsic, Maine, in Sagadahoc County. It is about 1,100 feet (340 m) SW of the front light of the Doubling Point Range Lights, and about 2,000 feet (610 m) east of Doubling Point Light. The pyramidal bell structure was built in 1914, two years after a large steamship, the Ransom B. Fuller, ran aground in the fog on this section of the river.

== History ==
The signal was rung to assist ships navigating the treacherous S-bend section of the river known as Fiddler Reach. It was a bell from 1914 until the late sixties and then a horn until it was discontinued in 1982. The signal, while not part of the Kennebec River Light Station, was tended by its station keeper. He reached it along a footpath that included a boardwalk and two wooden bridges. While it was a bell, it was rung by means of a clockwork counter weight system that had to be rewound every 4 hours. Bell signals were distinguished by the number of strokes and length of time between them. This signal was two strokes every twenty seconds.

The structure eventually fell into disrepair. The original bell was removed by the Coast Guard in 1972 and is now displayed on the campus of the Coast Guard Academy in New London, Connecticut.

It was restored by volunteer effort of the "Range Light Keepers", a self-described "group of interested local Maine citizens and visitors".

A replacement bell has been obtained and kept at the Arrowsic Town Hall. Until 2016 when the bell was installed on the tower's exterior bell arm

The property was added to the National Register of Historic Places (NRHP) on August 5, 2009, and the listing was announced as the featured listing in the National Park Service's weekly list of August 14, 2009.

== See also ==
- Fort Point Light Station, a Maine lighthouse station also having a pyramidal fog bell structure
- Perkins Island Light, four miles (6 km) downriver, also with a pyramidal fog bell structure
- Tenants Harbor Light, with a square pyramidal bell reconstructed by Jamie Wyeth.
- National Register of Historic Places listings in Sagadahoc County, Maine

== Gallery ==
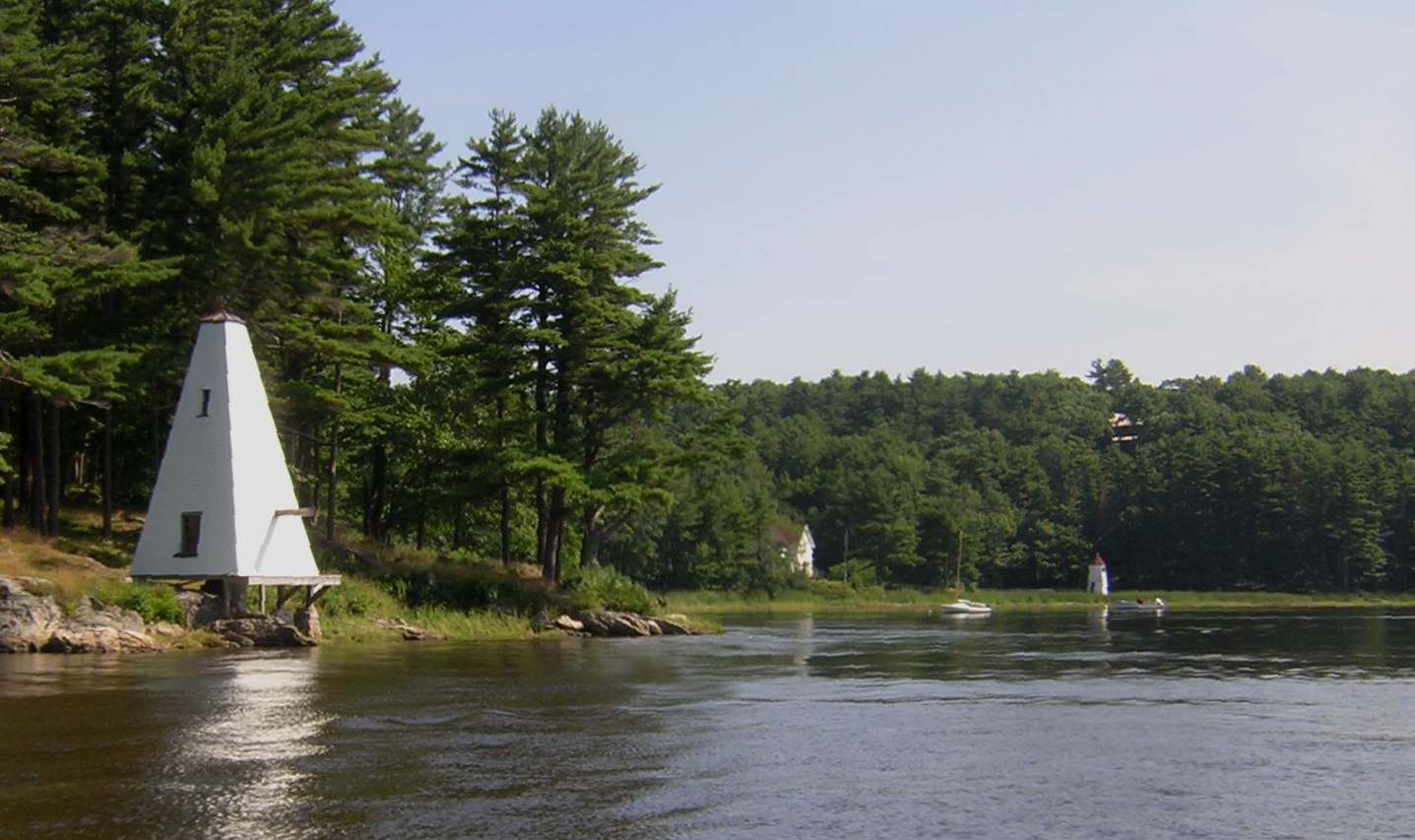
The fog signal (left) was tended by the keepers of the Doubling Point Range Lights a short distance downriver. The keeper's house is in the center and the front range light is to the right.
