= Robinhood Free Meetinghouse =

Historic church in Georgetown, Maine

- U.S. National Register of Historic Places
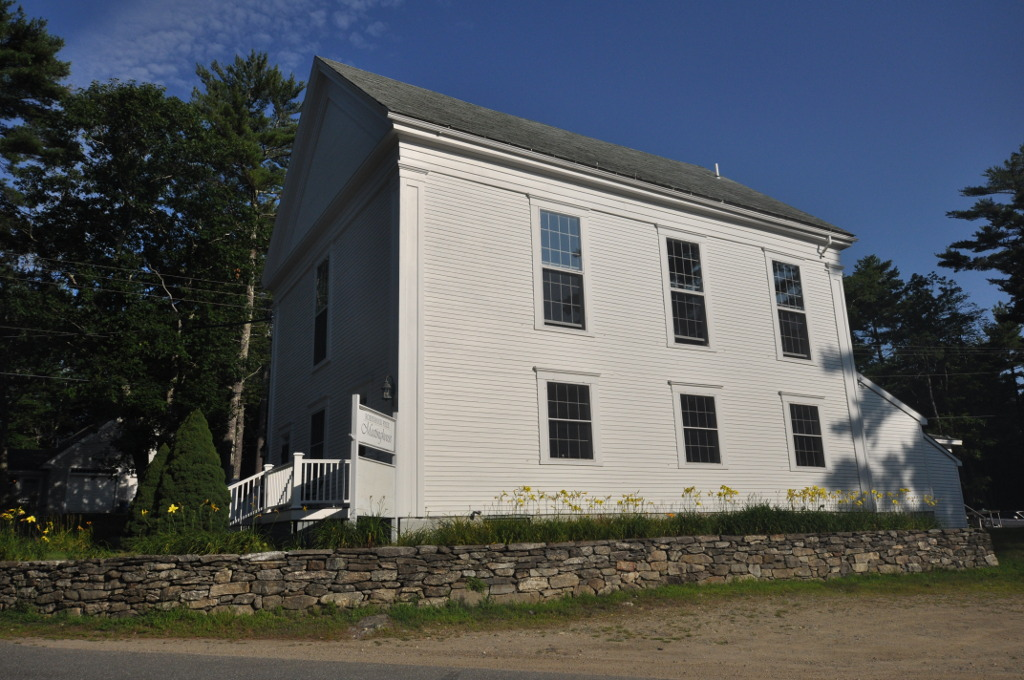

- Location within Maine Location within the United States
- Location: 210 Robinhood Rd., Georgetown, Maine
- Coordinates: 43°51′5″N 69°44′36″W
- Area: 0.57 acres (0.23 ha)
- Built: 1856 (170 years ago)
- Architect: Moses Riggs
- Architectural style: Greek Revival
- NRHP reference No.: 16000677
- Added to NRHP: September 26, 2016

The Robinhood Free Meetinghouse is a historic church building at 210 Robinhood Road in Georgetown, Maine. Built in 1856, it is a modest example of vernacular Greek Revival architecture, distinctive as one of Maine's few rural 19th-century churches to have its sanctuary space on the second floor. The building was listed on the National Register of Historic Places in 2016.

The building became a restaurant in 1995. As of 2026, it is used as a wedding venue.

== Description and history ==
The former Robinhood Free Meetinghouse stands in a rural area in the northern part of the island community of Georgetown, at the junction of Robinhood and Webber Roads. It is a two-story wood frame structure, with a gabled roof and clapboarded exterior. The front facade is symmetrical, with two entrances flanking a square multipane window in the center, above which is a sash window. The building corners have paneled pilasters rising to an entablature and a fully pedimented cornice. An open deck with balustrade extends most of the way across the front and beyond the left corner. The first floor interior originally consisted of three small chambers across the front, and a larger open chamber to the rear, which was used as a classroom. The main sanctuary is on the second floor, with original pews and other 19th-century features.

The church was completed in 1856, to house Methodist and Congregationalist church groups. The downstairs area served as a vestry meeting space and classroom for religious instruction. The church was designed by Moses Riggs, a member of a locally prominent family, and was built on land given by Herbert Low and Francis Low Jr. The Congregationalists ceased use of the church in 1864, while the Methodist congregation continued to use it for another century. It has since passed into private ownership, and has been adapted for use as a restaurant and, as of 2026, is a wedding venue.

== See also ==
- National Register of Historic Places listings in Sagadahoc County, Maine
