= Moses Riggs =

American architect (1795–1886)

- Born: June 18, 1795; Georgetown, Maine, U.S.
- Died: May 3, 1886 (aged 90); Georgetown, Maine, U.S.
- Occupation: Architect
- Design: Robinhood Free Meetinghouse

Moses Riggs (June 18, 1795 – May 3, 1886) was an American architect from Maine.

== Early life ==
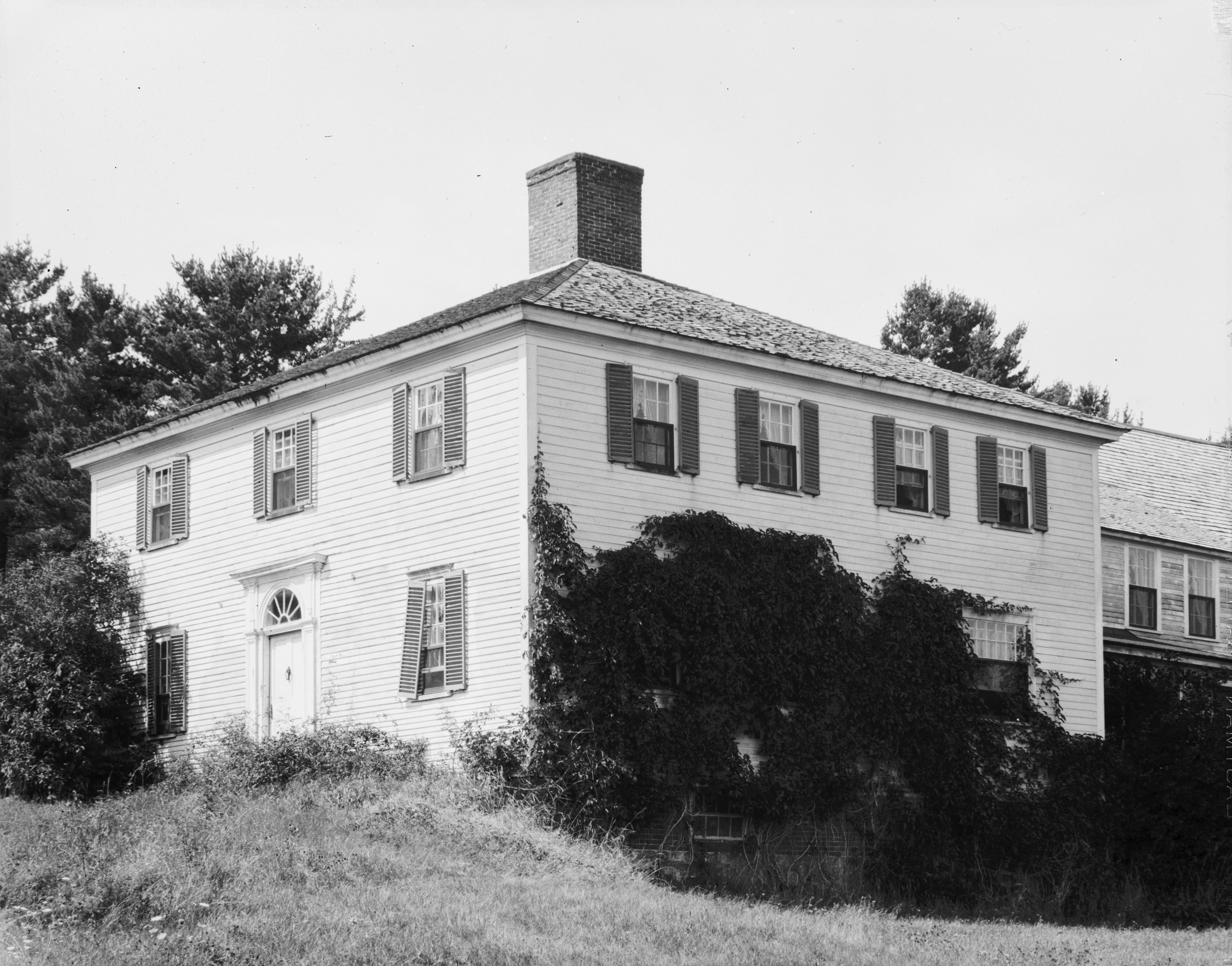
The 1790 Benjamin Riggs House, the oldest house in Georgetown, in which Moses grew up

Riggs was born in 1795 in Georgetown, Maine, to Benjamin Riggs and Ruth Pearl. He was one of their ten known children born between 1783 and 1804. Moses grew up in the Benjamin Riggs House, which his father built five years before Moses's birth. It is now the oldest house in the town.

== Career ==
In October 1838, Riggs was a director of the Sagadahock Bank.

After the death of Riggs's father in 1846, Moses assumed the role of head of the Riggs home and family.

In 1856, he designed the Robinhood Free Meetinghouse in his hometown. It was added to the National Register of Historic Places 160 years later.

Riggs retired in 1884, and his 55-year-old son, Kervin, took over the family business.

== Notable works ==
- Robinhood Free Meetinghouse, Georgetown, Maine (1856)

== Personal life ==
In 1821, Riggs married Martha S. Fisher. They had six known children (one, son Charles, died at four days old in 1825) before her death in 1840. A year later, he married Louisa Patten, with whom he had two children.

== Death ==
Riggs died in 1886, aged 90. He was interred in Georgetown's Riggs Cemetery, alongside both of his wives, the second of which he survived by nine years.
