= Doubling Point Range Lights =

Lighthouses in Maine, US

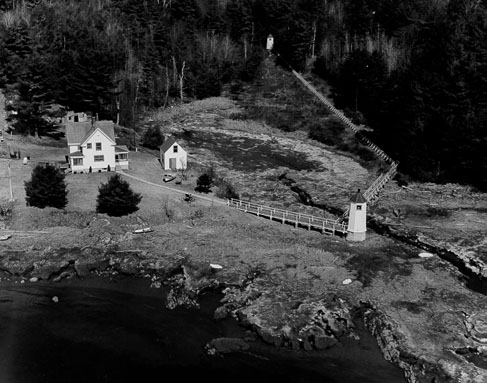
- Front Light in foreground, Rear Light just visible, right of middle in the background
- Location: Sagadahoc County, United States
- Coordinates: 43°52′58″N 69°47′44″W

Tower
- Constructed: 1898
- Heritage: National Register of Historic Places listed place
- Doubling Point Front Range Light
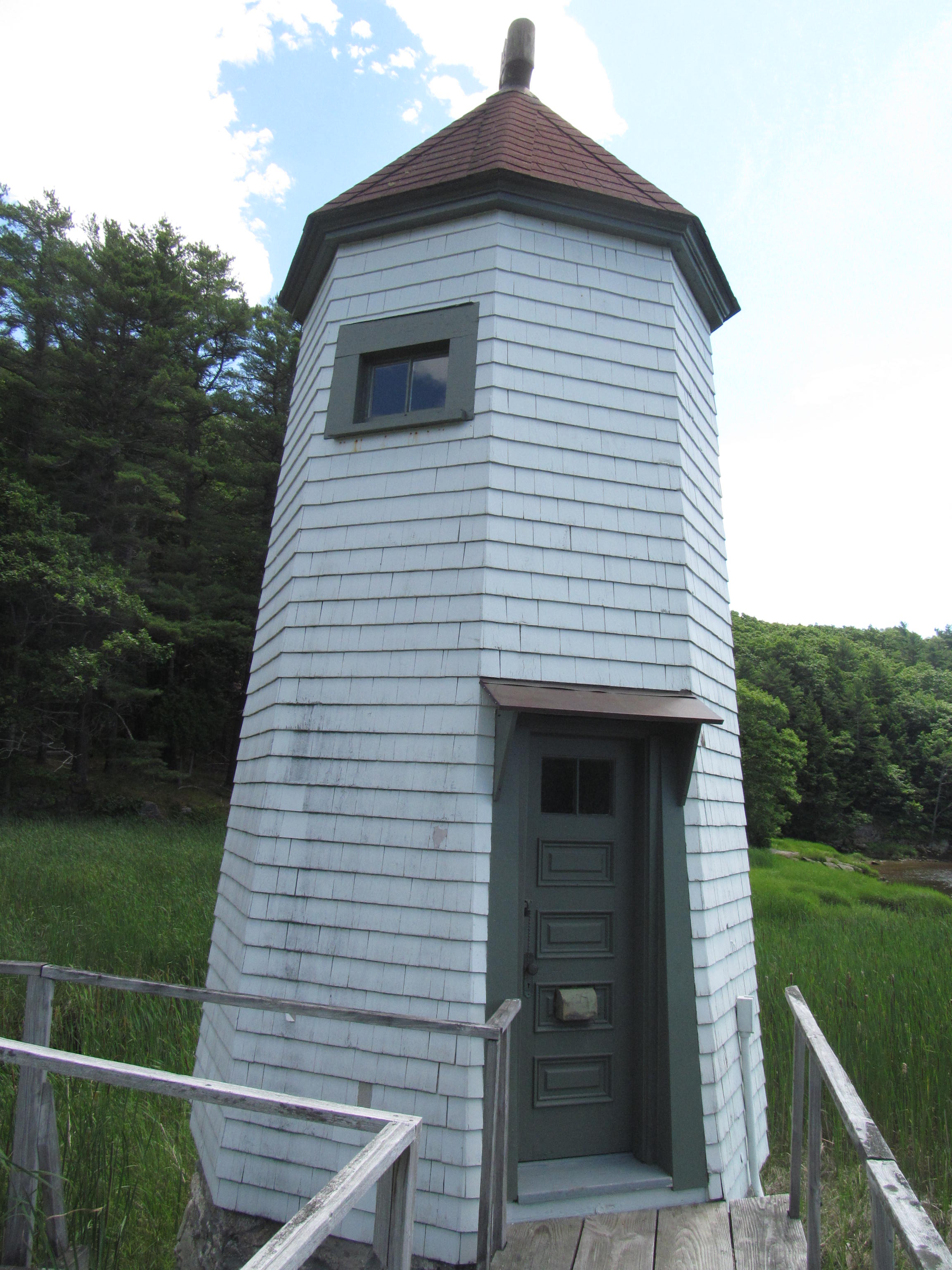
- Construction: structural wood (tower), granite (foundation)
- Automated: 1988
- Height: 17 ft (5.2 m)
- Shape: octagon
- Markings: White (tower), red (roof)
- Operator: United States Coast Guard
- Focal height: 18 ft (5.5 m)
- Characteristic: Q W
- Doubling Point Rear Range Light
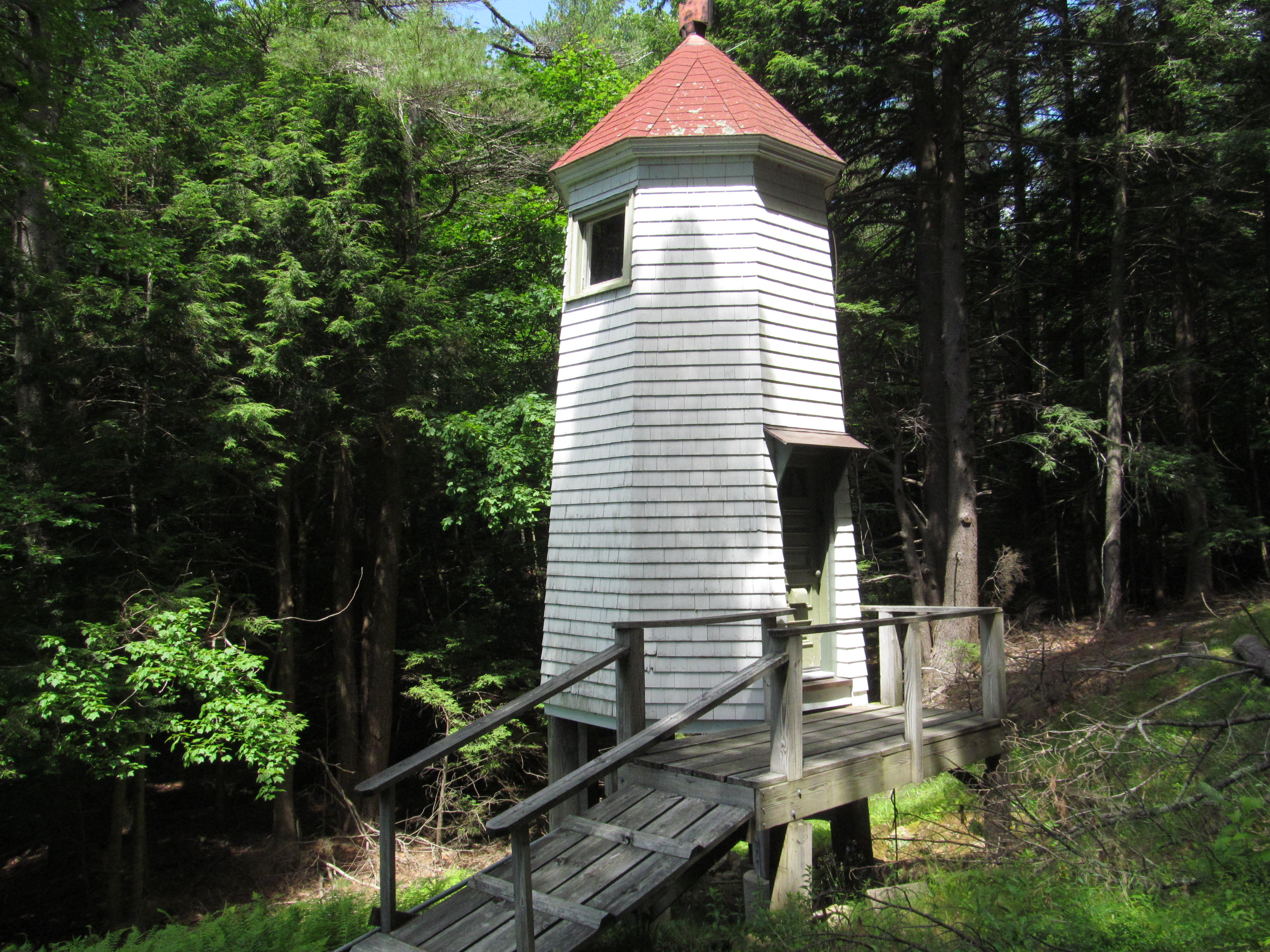
- Construction: structural wood (tower), granite (foundation)
- Height: 13 ft (4.0 m)
- Shape: octagon
- Markings: White (tower), red (roof)
- Operator: United States Coast Guard
- Focal height: 33 ft (10 m)
- Characteristic: Iso W 6s
- Kennebec River Light Station
- U.S. National Register of Historic Places
- U.S. Historic district
- Nearest city: Bath, Maine
- Area: 7 acres (2.8 ha)
- Architect: U.S. Army Corps of Engineers
- MPS: Light Stations of Maine MPS
- NRHP reference No.: 87002263

The Doubling Point Range Lights are a pair of range lights on the Kennebec River, in Arrowsic, Maine. Built in 1898 as part of a major improvement on navigational aids on the river, they are the only surviving pair of range lights in the state. They were listed on the National Register of Historic Places as Kennebec River Light Station on January 21, 1988.

== Description and history ==
The Doubling Point Range Lights are located on the lower Kennebec River, at a point where the normally south-flowing river makes a sharp turn to the east, followed by a turn back to the south. The range lights are set on the north side of the second turn; the first is marked by the Doubling Point Light. The range lights are oriented so that they are in alignment when seen from the main channel to the south. The light station consists of two octagonal wood frame towers, a keeper's house, and an oil house. The towers are joined to the keeper's house by wooden walkways with railings. The southern tower is 17 feet (5.2 m) in height, while the northern one is 13 feet (4.0 m) tall. When a ship is properly in the main channel, only the southern light will be visible.

The keeper's house stands west and a little north of the southern light. It is an L-shaped wood-frame structure, with a hip roof and a granite foundation. It has enclosed hip-roofed porches on its east and west sides. The oil house, standing further west of the house, is a small brick structure, with a gable roof, a narrow vent in one of the gable ends, and a centrally placed door.

The range lights were established in 1898, fifteen years after the founding of the Bath Iron Works, a major shipbuilder, one and a half miles upriver. They were part of a major upgrade of the river's lights — the Doubling Point Light, Perkins Island Light, and Squirrel Point Light were all built at the same time.

== Gallery ==
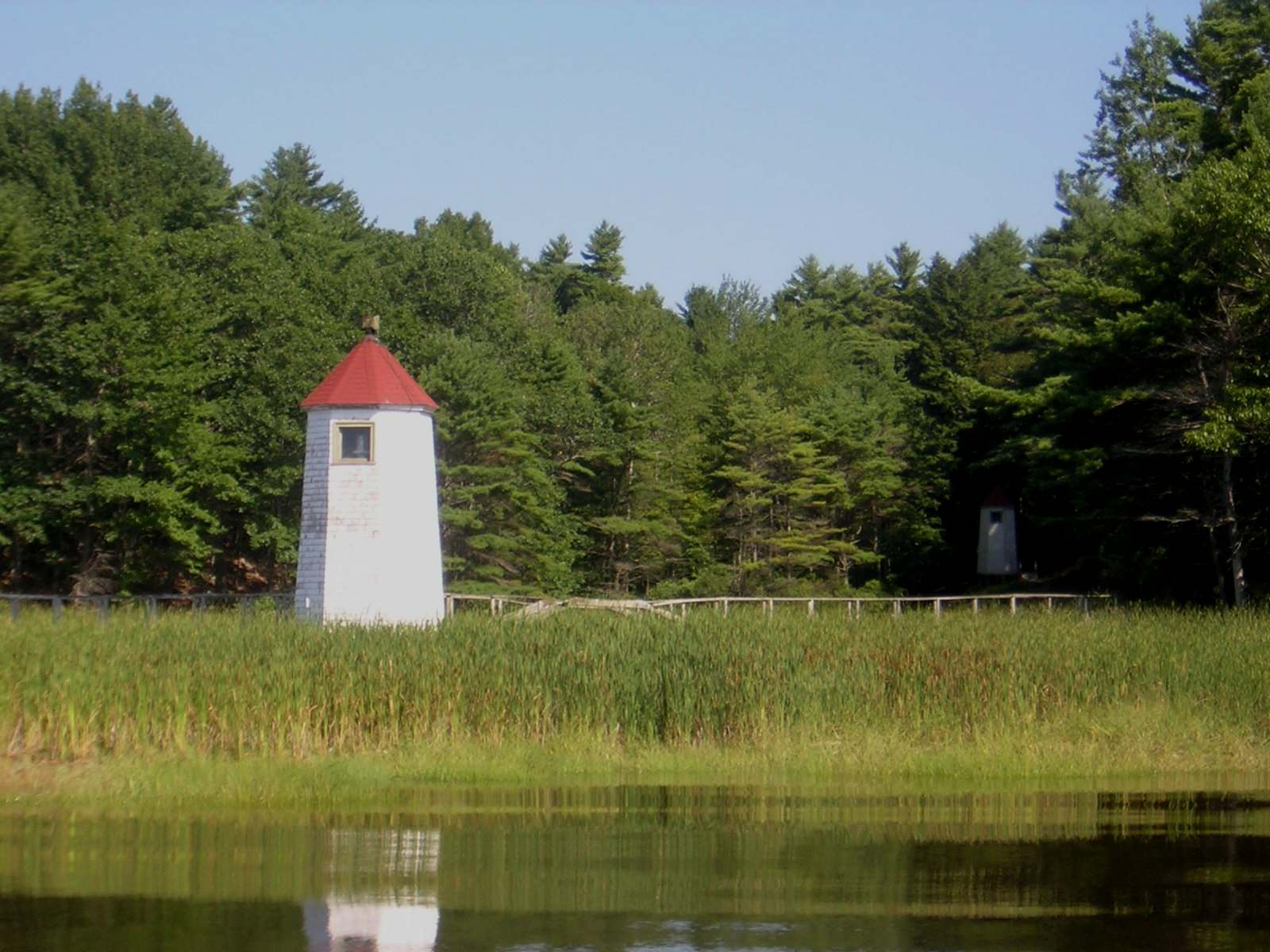
The two structures are more or less identical, but they show different characteristics at night.

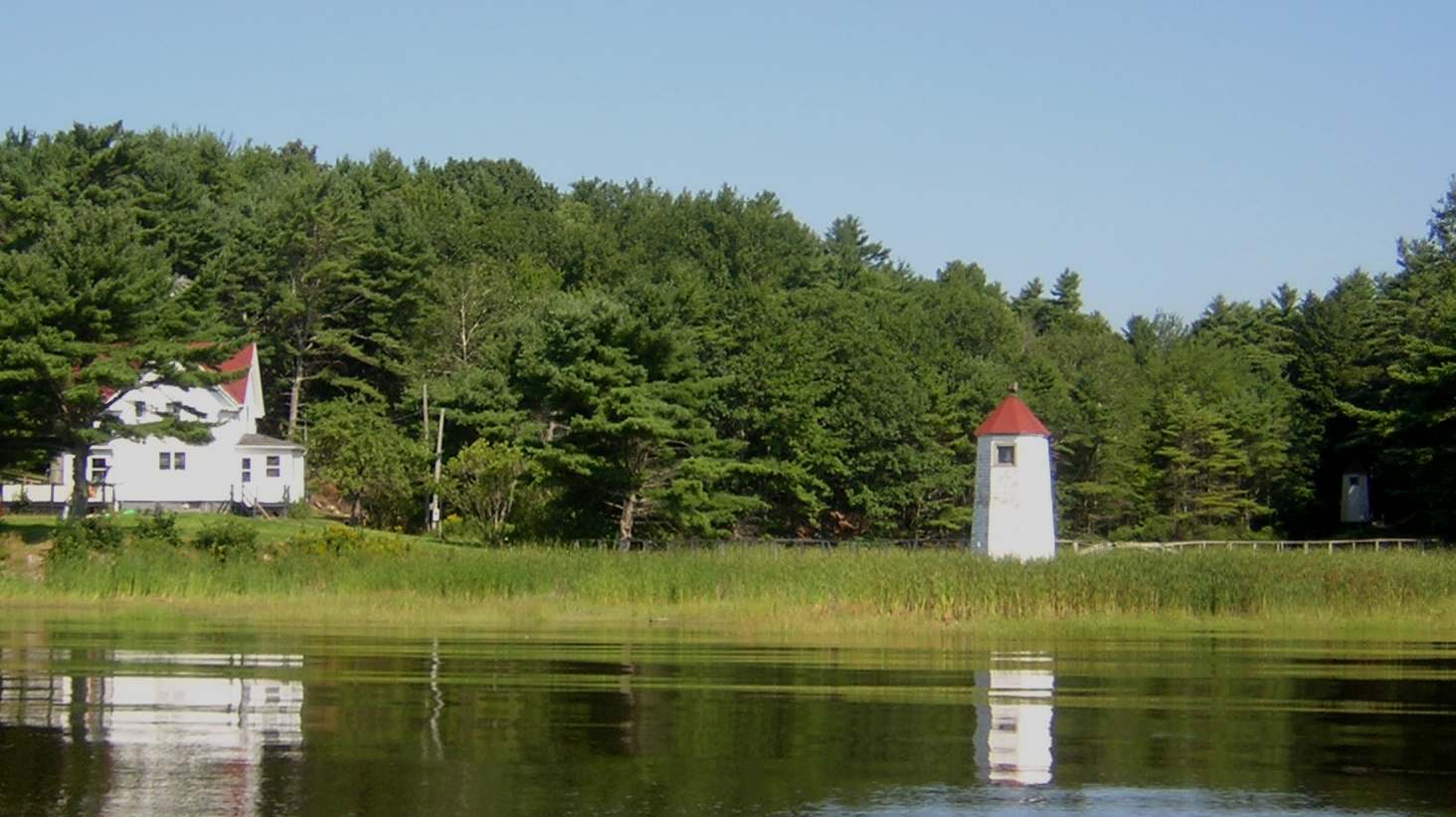
The keepers' quarters are to the left.

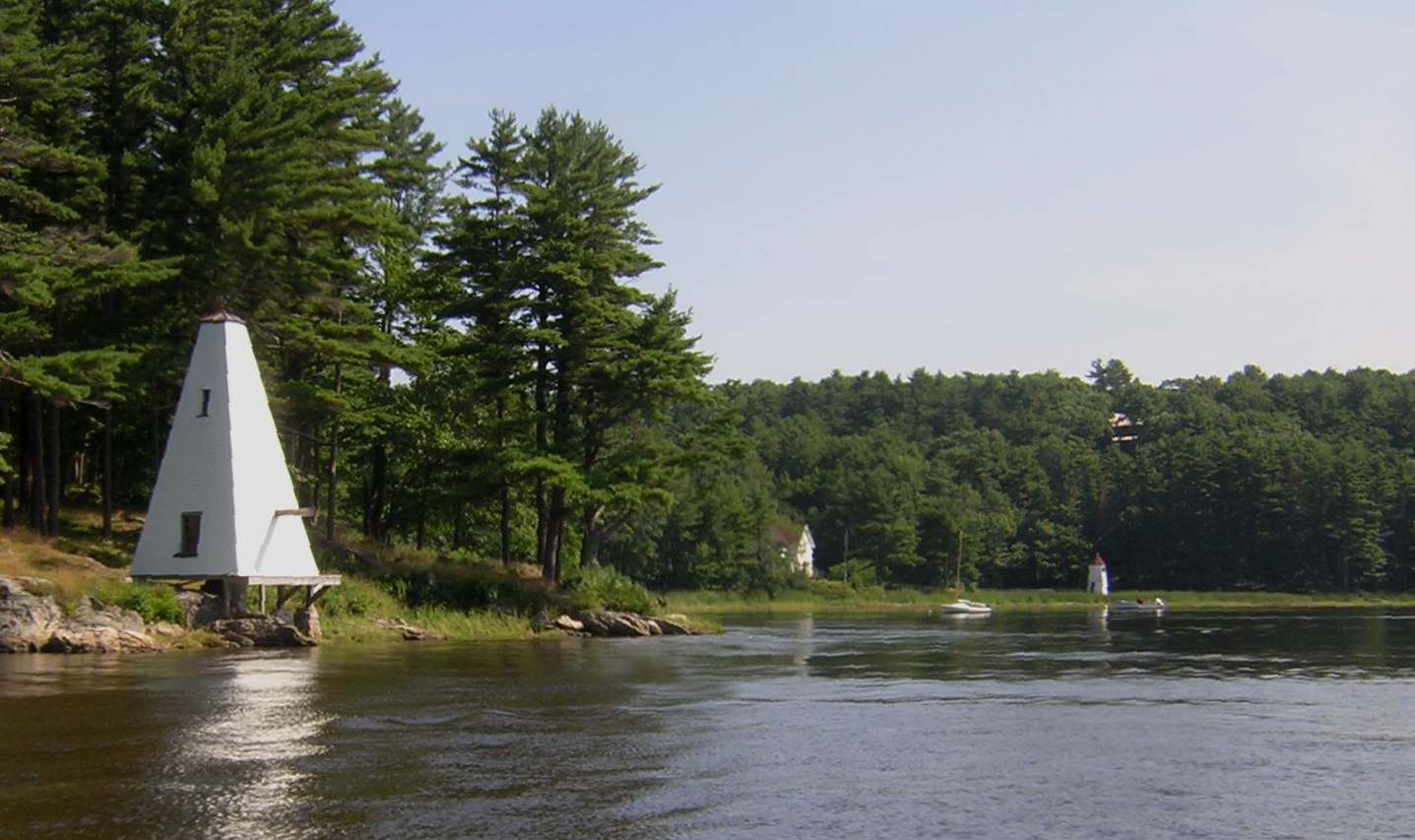
The Fiddler's Reach Fog Signal (left) was also tended by the Doubling Point Range Lights' keepers

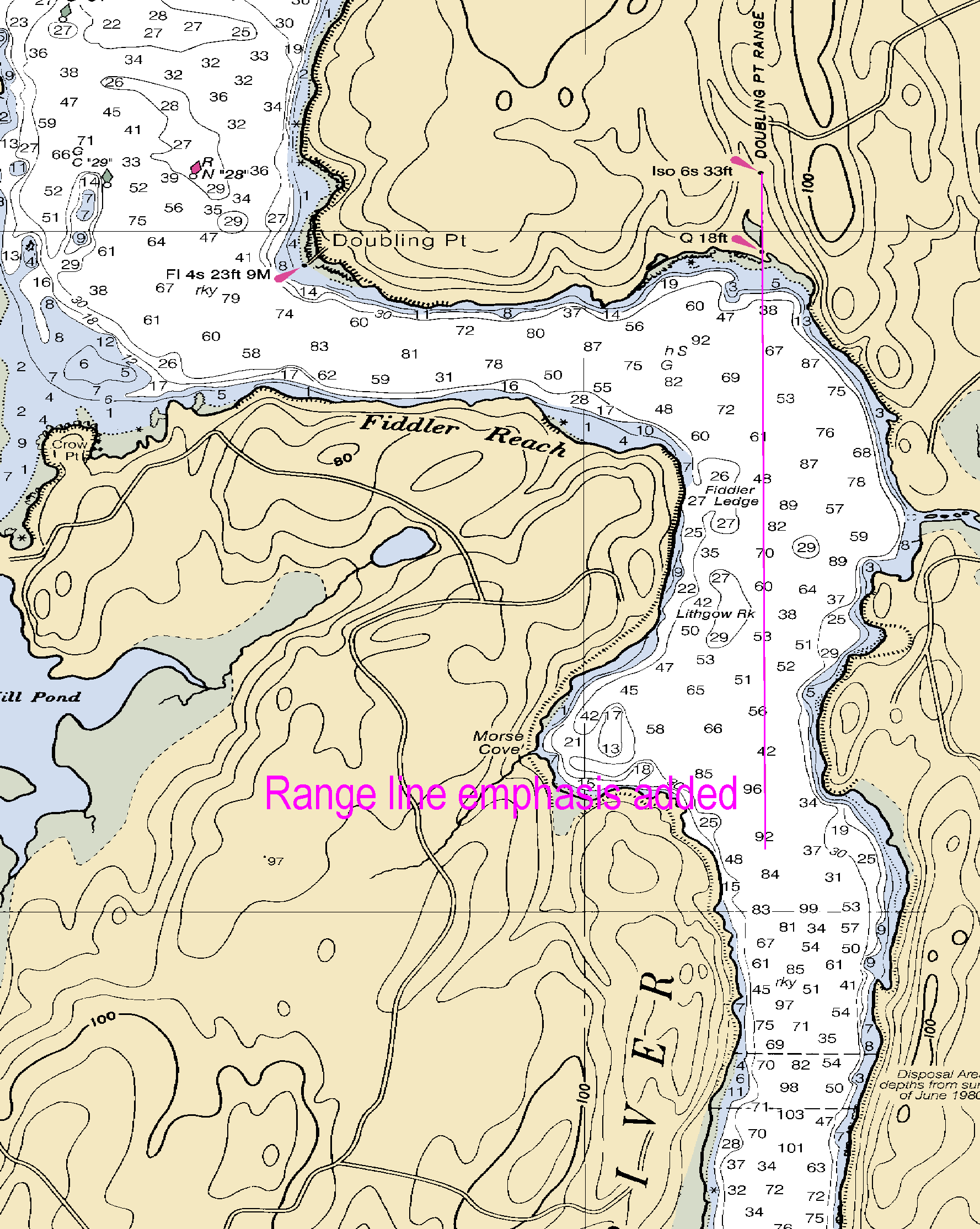
The range as it appears on NOAA Chart 13296

== See also ==
- National Register of Historic Places listings in Sagadahoc County, Maine
