= Benjamin Riggs House =

Historic house in Maine, United States

- U.S. National Register of Historic Places
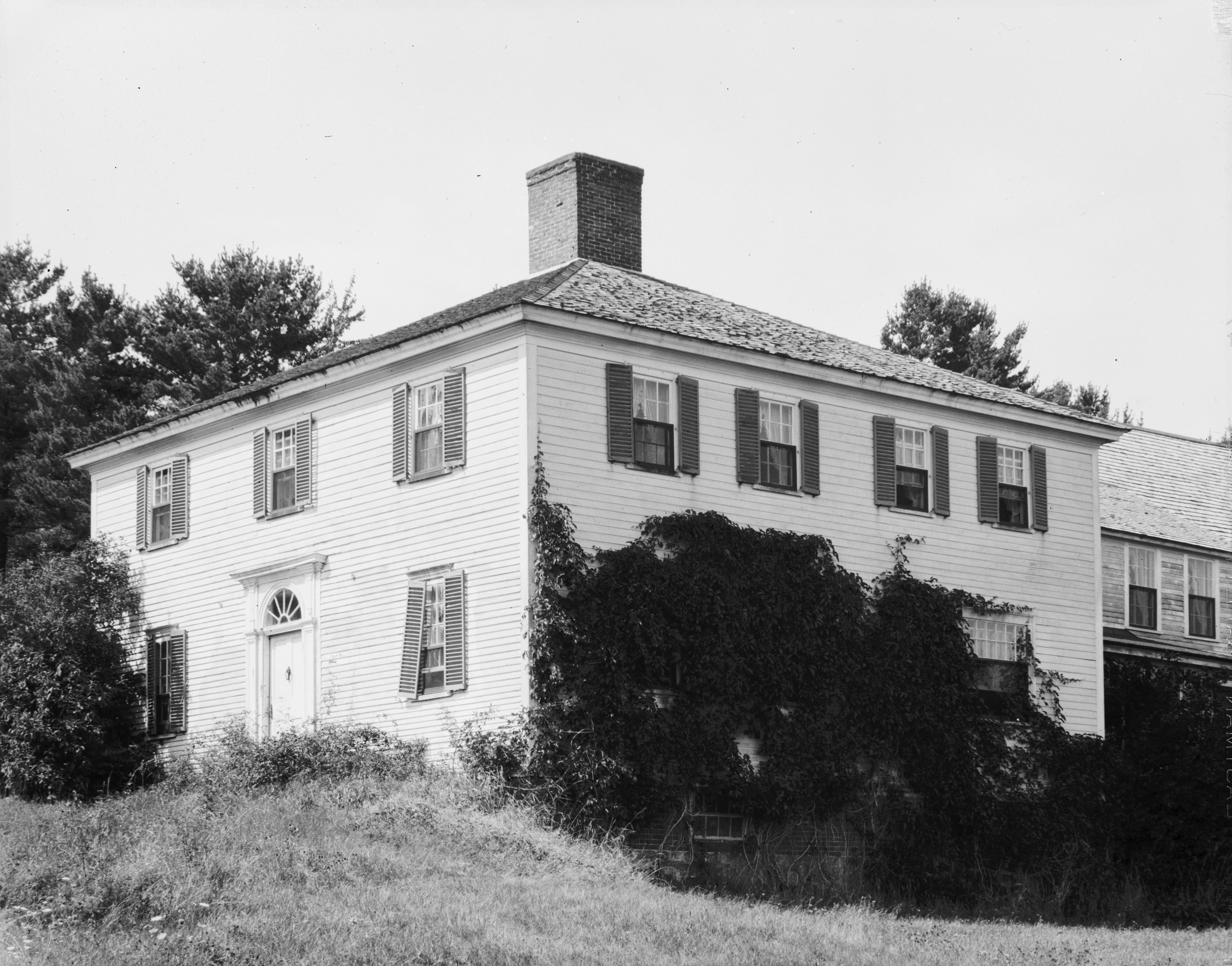

- Location within Maine Location within the United States
- Location: Robinhood Rd., Georgetown, Maine
- Coordinates: 43°51′13″N 69°44′12″W
- Area: less than one acre
- Built: 1790
- Architectural style: Federal
- NRHP reference No.: 88003008
- Added to NRHP: December 22, 1988

The Benjamin Riggs House is a historic house on Robinhood Road in Georgetown, Maine. Built about 1790, it is the oldest house in Georgetown, and is a well-preserved example of transitional Georgian-Federal architecture. It was listed on the National Register of Historic Places in 1988.

== Description and history ==
The Benjamin Riggs House stands on the east side of Robinhood Road, near the Robinhood Marine Center in northern Georgetown. It is a two-story wood-frame structure, with a hip roof, central chimney, clapboard siding, and granite foundation. Its main facade faces south, with an ell extending north to join the house to a barn. The front is three bays wide, symmetrically arranged, with its entrance framed by pilasters and topped by a half-round fanlight window and cornice. The interior retains many period features, including paneled fireplace surrounds, beaded wainscoting, and a front stair with turned newel posts and balusters.

The house was built about 1790 by Benjamin Riggs, a native of Gloucester, Massachusetts, who supposedly settled here in 1776 at age seventeen. Successful in the shipping business, Riggs had this house built, along with storehouses at a nearby wharf. He served in the Massachusetts legislature, and also in the Maine legislature after it achieved statehood in 1820. It is the most architecturally distinctive house in Georgetown's Robinhood area.

== See also ==
- National Register of Historic Places listings in Sagadahoc County, Maine
- Moses Riggs, architect and Benjamin's son
