= Reid State Park =

State park in Sagadahoc County, Maine

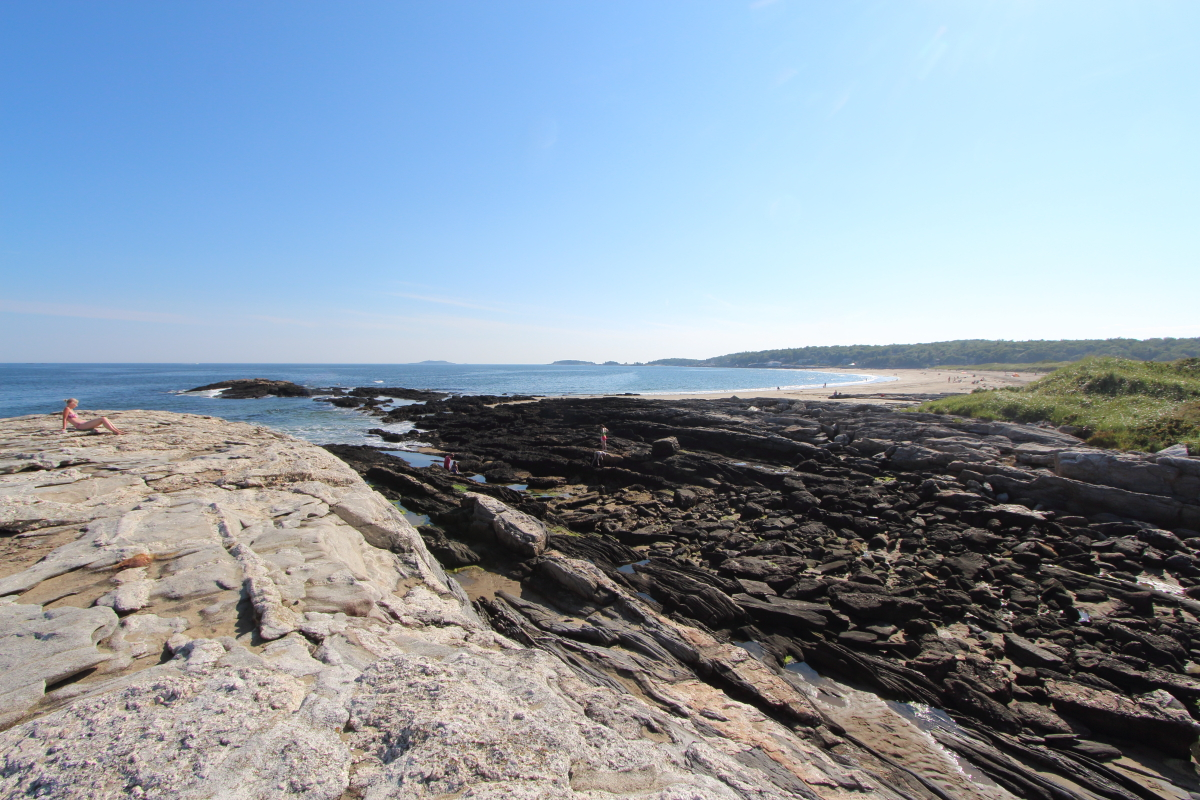

- Location within Maine
- Interactive map of Reid State Park
- Location: Georgetown, Maine, United States
- Coordinates: 43°46′44″N 69°43′33″W
- Area: 770 acres (310 ha)
- Elevation: 59 ft (18 m)
- Established: 1946
- Named for: Walter E. Reid
- Administrator: Maine Department of Agriculture, Conservation and Forestry
- Website: Official website
- Maine State Parks

Reid State Park is a public recreation area overlooking the Atlantic Ocean on Georgetown Island in Sagadahoc County, Maine, United States. The 770-acre (310 ha) park is noted for its sandy beaches and sand dunes—both rare in the state of Maine—plus its rocky tidepools, salt marshes, and tidal lagoon. The park is managed by the Maine Department of Agriculture, Conservation and Forestry.

== History ==
The park lands were donated to the state in 1946 by businessman and philanthropist Walter E. Reid, a native of Georgetown who grew up in a family of modest means and who built an oceanside estate near the grounds of the present-day park.

== Activities and amenities ==
Ocean swimming is offered at Mile Beach and Half Mile Beach, while warmer waters are found at a tidal inlet, The Lagoon, where the quieter waters tend to be 10 to 15 degrees warmer. The park also has picnicking areas, fishing, and hiking trails. The beaches provide essential nesting areas for endangered least terns and piping plovers. Other wildlife commonly found along the beaches include various shorebirds, eider ducks, clams, and mussels.
