= Fog signal station =

A fog signal station is a facility with a fog signal but with no lighthouse. A light tower might be appended to the station later, as happened at The Cuckolds Light in Maine. Several of these stations were constructed along the California coast, although few survive in their original form.

== See also ==
- Fiddler's Reach Fog Signal
- Lime Point Light
- Manana Island Sound Signal Station
