= Perkins Island Light =

Lighthouse in Maine, US

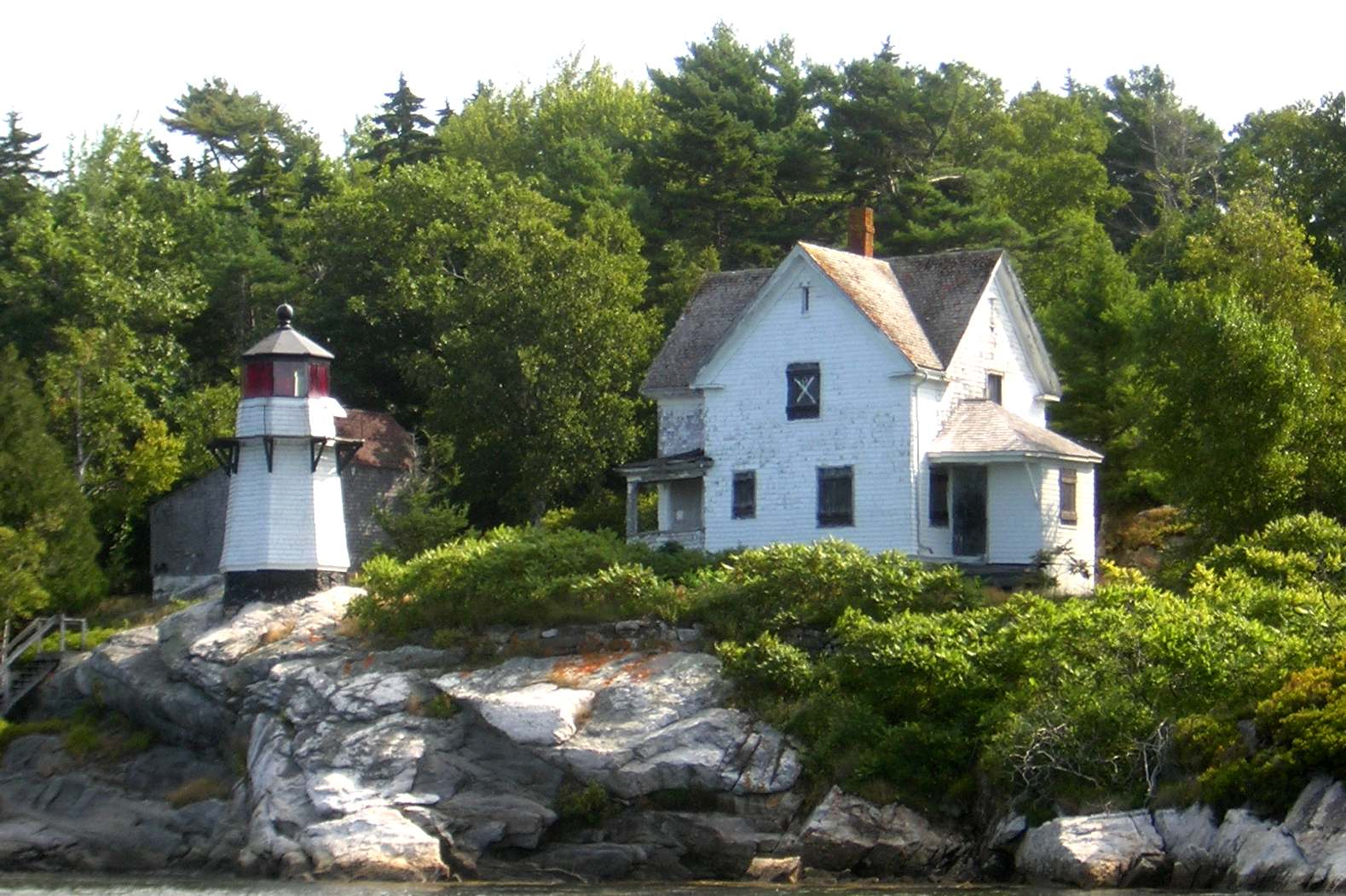
- Perkins Island Light and keeper's house
- Location: Kennebec River, Maine
- Coordinates: 43°47′12.359″N 69°47′6.889″W

Tower
- Constructed: 1898
- Foundation: Brick
- Construction: Wood
- Automated: 1959
- Height: 7 m (23 ft)
- Shape: Octagonal Wood Tower
- Markings: White
- Heritage: National Register of Historic Places listed place

Light
- First lit: 1898
- Focal height: 41 feet (12 m)
- Lens: 5th order Fresnel lens (original), 9.8 inches (250 mm) (current)
- Range: 6 nautical miles (11 km; 6.9 mi) & 5 nautical miles (9.3 km; 5.8 mi)
- Characteristic: Fl R 2.5s with 2 W sectors
- Perkins Island Light Station
- U.S. National Register of Historic Places
- U.S. Historic district
- Location: Georgetown, Maine
- Area: 7 acres (2.8 ha)
- Architect: US Army Corps of Engineers
- MPS: Light Stations of Maine MPS
- NRHP reference No.: 87002282
- Added to NRHP: January 21, 1988

Perkins Island Light is a lighthouse on the Kennebec River in Maine. It was established in 1898, as part of a major upgrade of the river's lights — the Doubling Point Light and the separate Range Lights on the point, Perkins Island Light, and Squirrel Point Light were all built at the same time. It was listed on the National Register of Historic Places as Perkins Island Light Station in 1988.

== Description and history ==
Perkins Island is a small, predominantly wooded island in the southern reaches of the Kennebec River, on the west side of Georgetown Island. It has a teardrop shape, oriented north–south, with the light station located at the westernmost part of the island. The station consists of a tower, keeper's house, barn, bell house, and oil house. The tower is a tapered octagonal wood-frame structure, with its exterior clad in wooden shingles. The lantern light stands 17 feet (5.2 m) above its base, in an octagonal lanternhouse with a surrounding exterior gallery.

The keeper's house is a 2 1/2-story L-shaped wood-frame structure, with a cross-gabled roof and wooden shingle exterior. To its north stands a small wood-frame barn, also with a gabled roof and shingled exterior. To the south of the tower stands the oil house, a small brock gable-roofed structure. The bell tower is a pyramidal structure covered in shingles, standing near the shore south of the tower.

The light station was authorized by Congress in 1895, following recommendations by the Lighthouse Board in 1892 that the Kennebec River's aids to navigation be improved. The tower, barn, and keeper's house were completed in 1898, the year the light went into service. The station also originally included a boathouse, which has not survived. The bell tower was added in 1902, and the oil house was added in 1906. The station was automated in 1959, and most of the buildings were transferred to the state in the 1960s. The light continues to serve as an active aid to navigation.

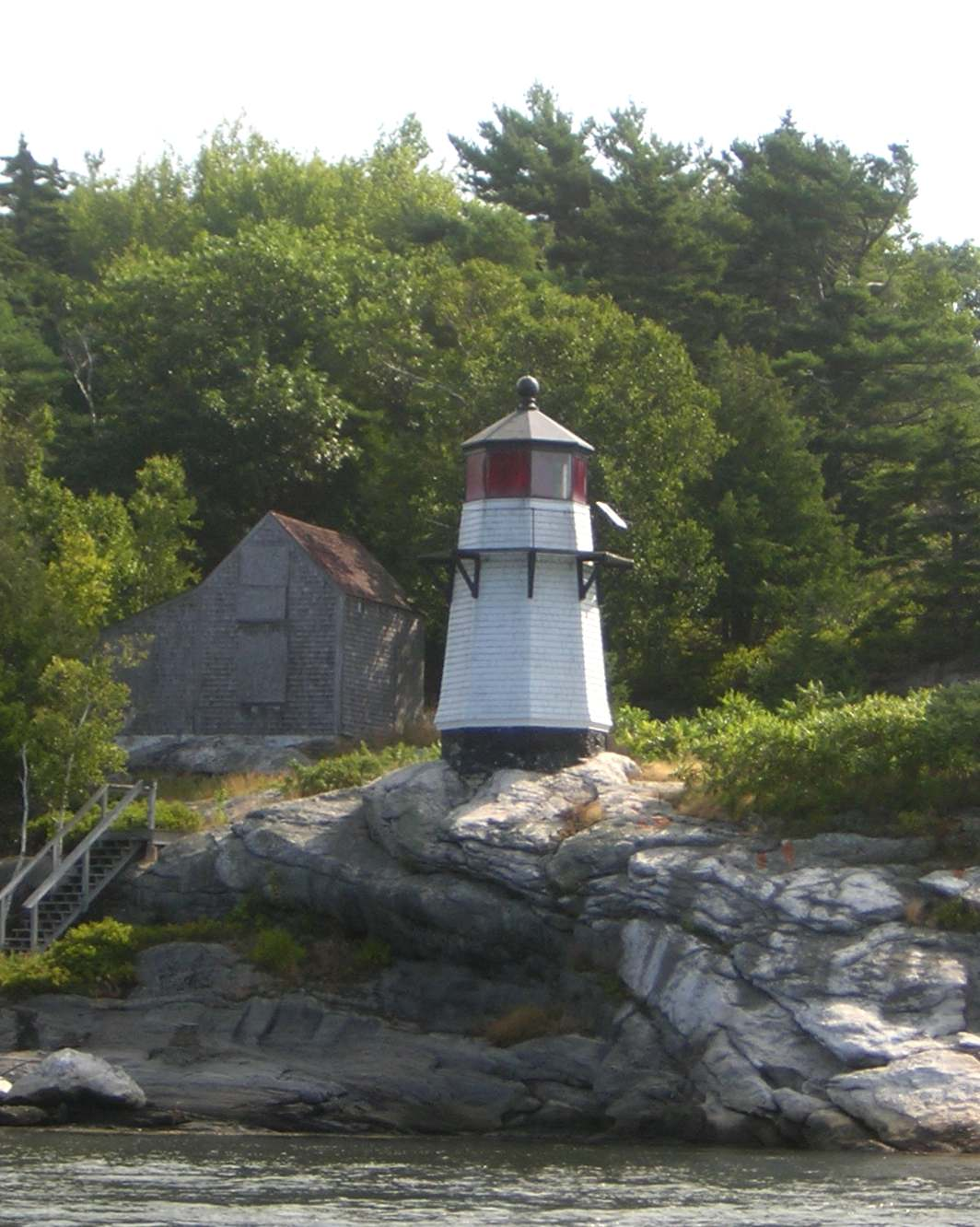
Closeup of lighthouse

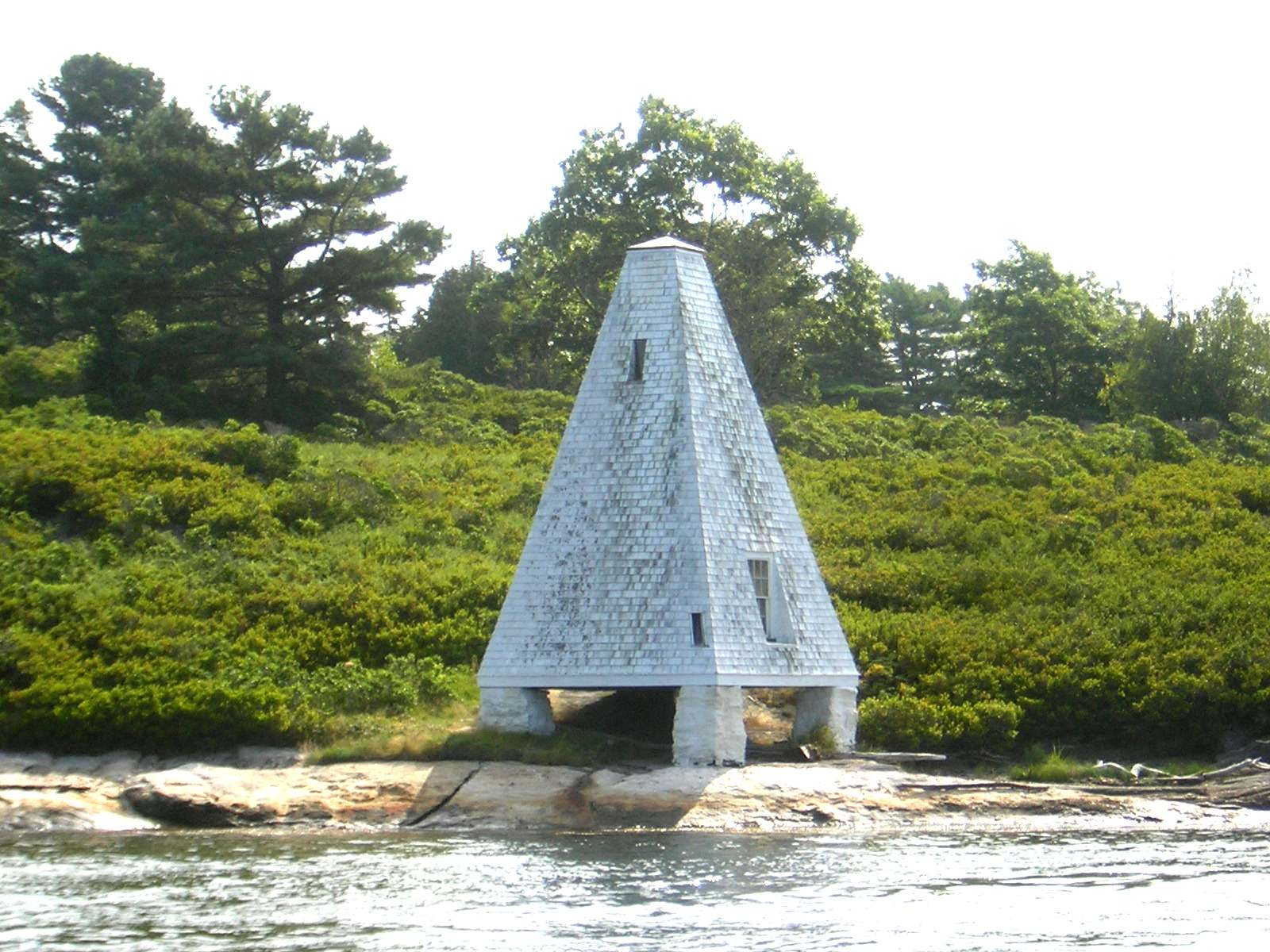
Bell tower

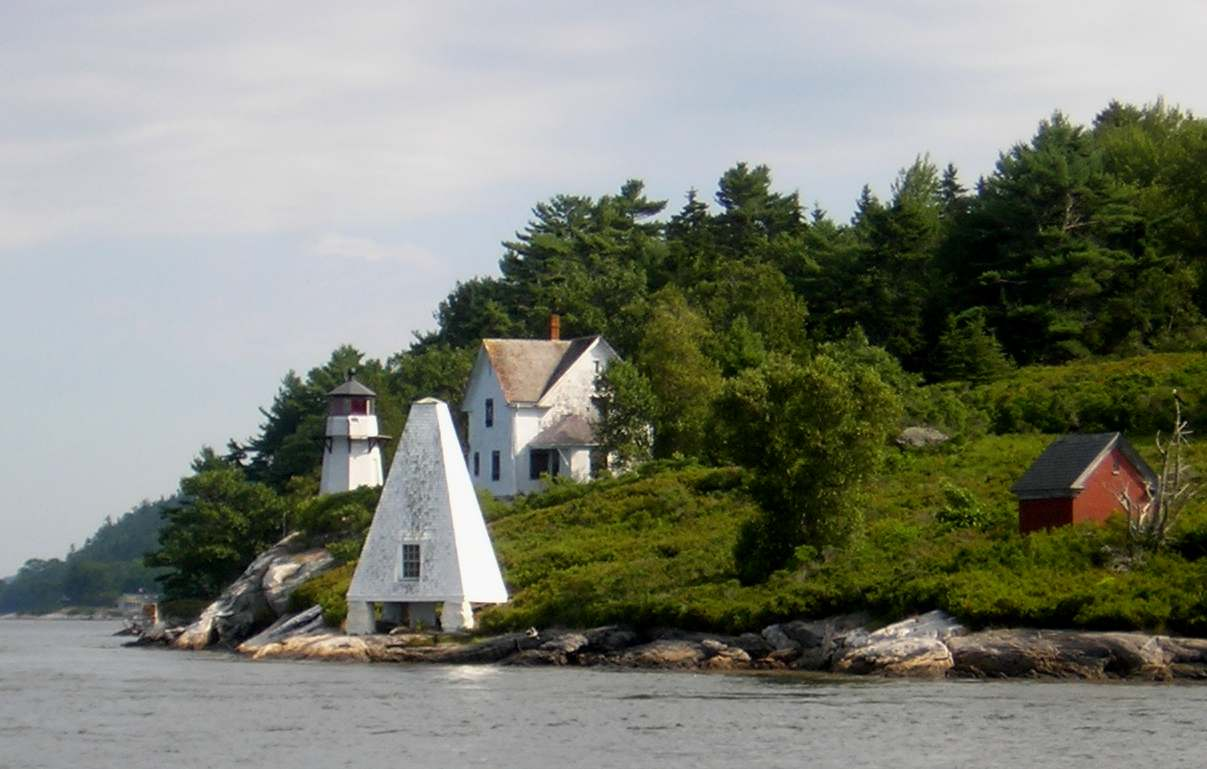
L-R: Light, Bell Tower, Keepers' Quarters, Oil House

== See also ==
- National Register of Historic Places listings in Sagadahoc County, Maine
