= Squirrel Point Light =

Lighthouse in Maine, US

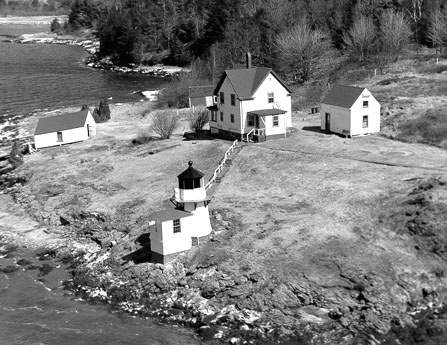
- U.S. Coast Guard photo
- Location: Kennebec River, Maine
- Coordinates: 43°48′59.483″N 69°48′8.572″W

Tower
- Constructed: 1898
- Construction: structural wood
- Automated: 1979
- Height: 7.5 m (25 ft)
- Shape: Octagonal Wood Tower
- Markings: White
- Heritage: National Register of Historic Places listed place
- Fog signal: none

Light
- Focal height: 25 feet (7.6 m)
- Lens: 5th order Fresnel lens (original), 9.8 inches (250 mm) (current)
- Range: White 8 nautical miles (15 km; 9.2 mi); Red 7 nautical miles (13 km; 8.1 mi)
- Characteristic: Isophase Red 6s with W sector
- Squirrel Point Light Station
- U.S. National Register of Historic Places
- U.S. Historic district
- Nearest city: Arrowsic, Maine
- Area: 5 acres (2.0 ha)
- Architect: US Army Corps of Engineers
- MPS: Light Stations of Maine MPS
- NRHP reference No.: 87002281
- Added to NRHP: January 21, 1988

Squirrel Point Light is a lighthouse marking the southwestern point of Arrowsic Island on the Kennebec River. It was established in 1898, as part of a major upgrade of the river's lights — the Doubling Point Light and the separate Range Lights on the point, Perkins Island Light, and Squirrel Point Light were all built at the same time. The light station was listed on the National Register of Historic Places as Squirrel Point Light Station on January 21, 1988.

== Description and history ==
Arrowsic Island is a large island on the Mid Coast of Maine, bounded by a number of tidal rivers. The main one, the Kennebec River, is on the west side of the island, flowing south from the major port and shipbuilding city of Bath to the Gulf of Maine. Squirrel Point is the southwestern tip of the island. The light station at Squirrel Point includes a tower, keeper's house, barn, boathouse, and oil house. The tower is an octagonal wood-frame structure, with the lantern house topped by a ventilator and surrounded by an iron railing and wooden bracketed gallery. A gabled sound signal chamber is attached to one side. The keeper's house is a two-story wood-frame structure with a cross-gable roof.

The United States Congress authorized improvements to the aids to navigation on the Kennebec River in 1895, and this station was built under that authorization in 1898. The oil house was added in 1906, and the station was automated in 1982.

== Gallery ==
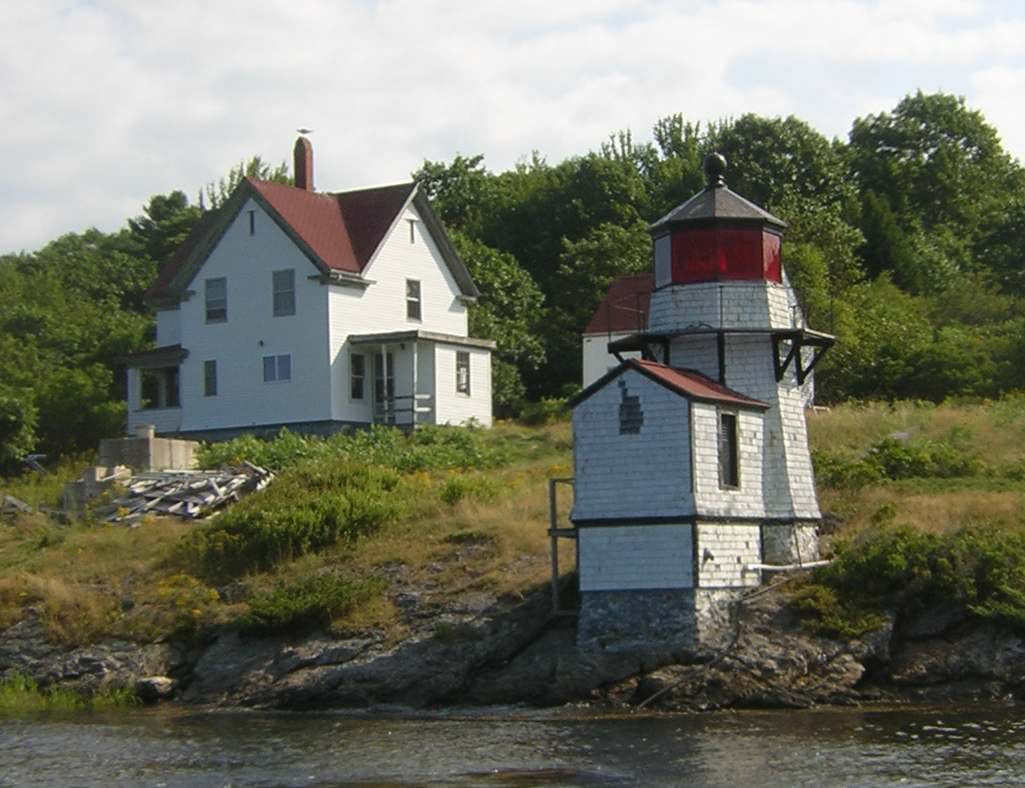
Squirrel Point Light with keeper's quarters

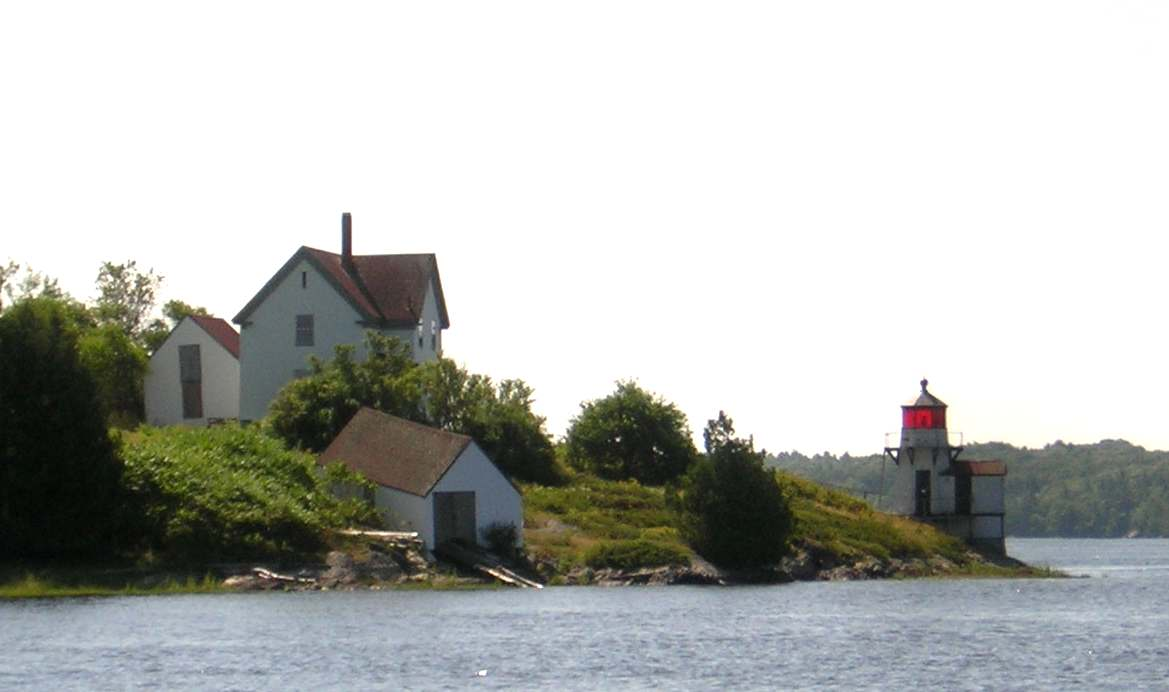
From upriver

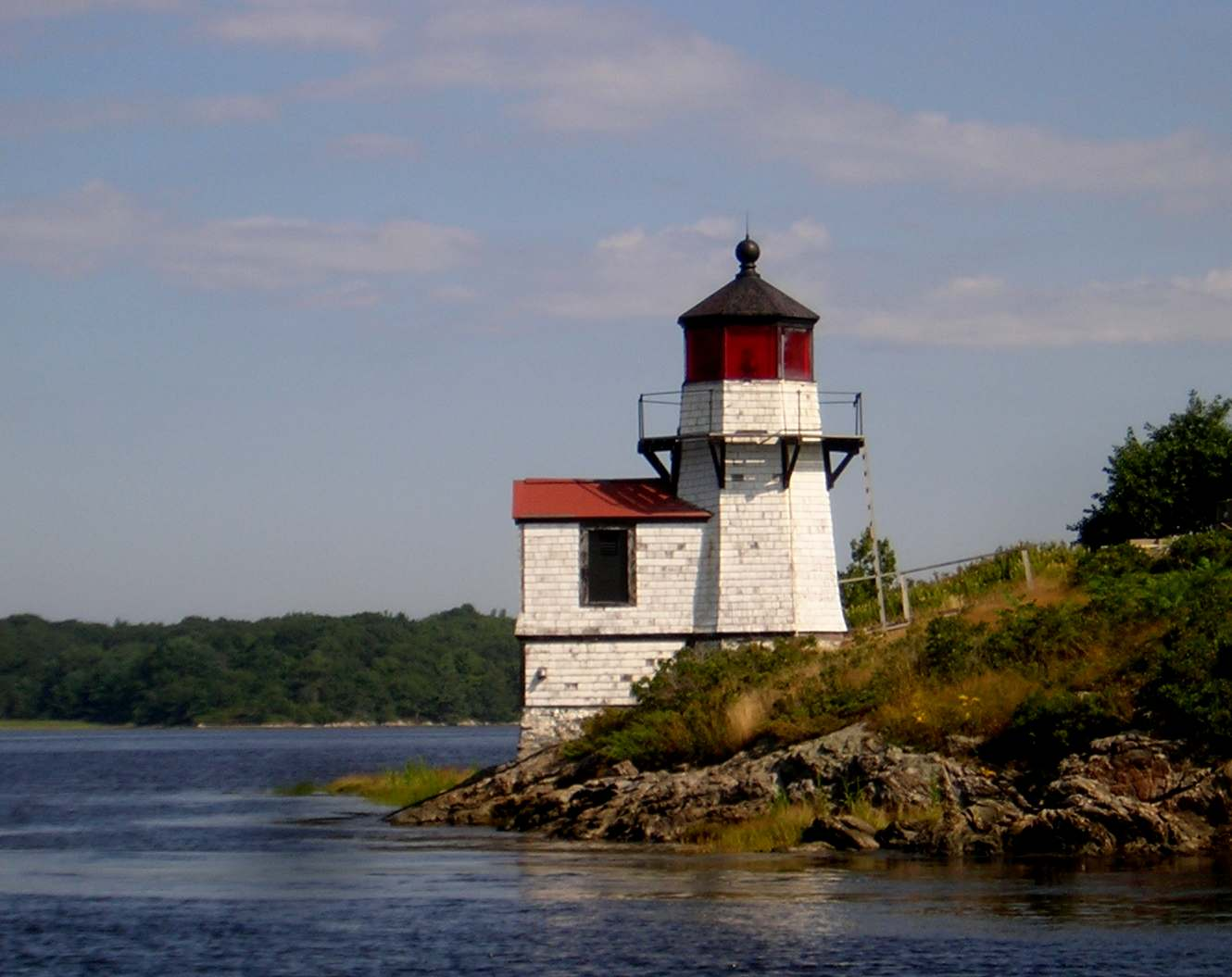
From downriver

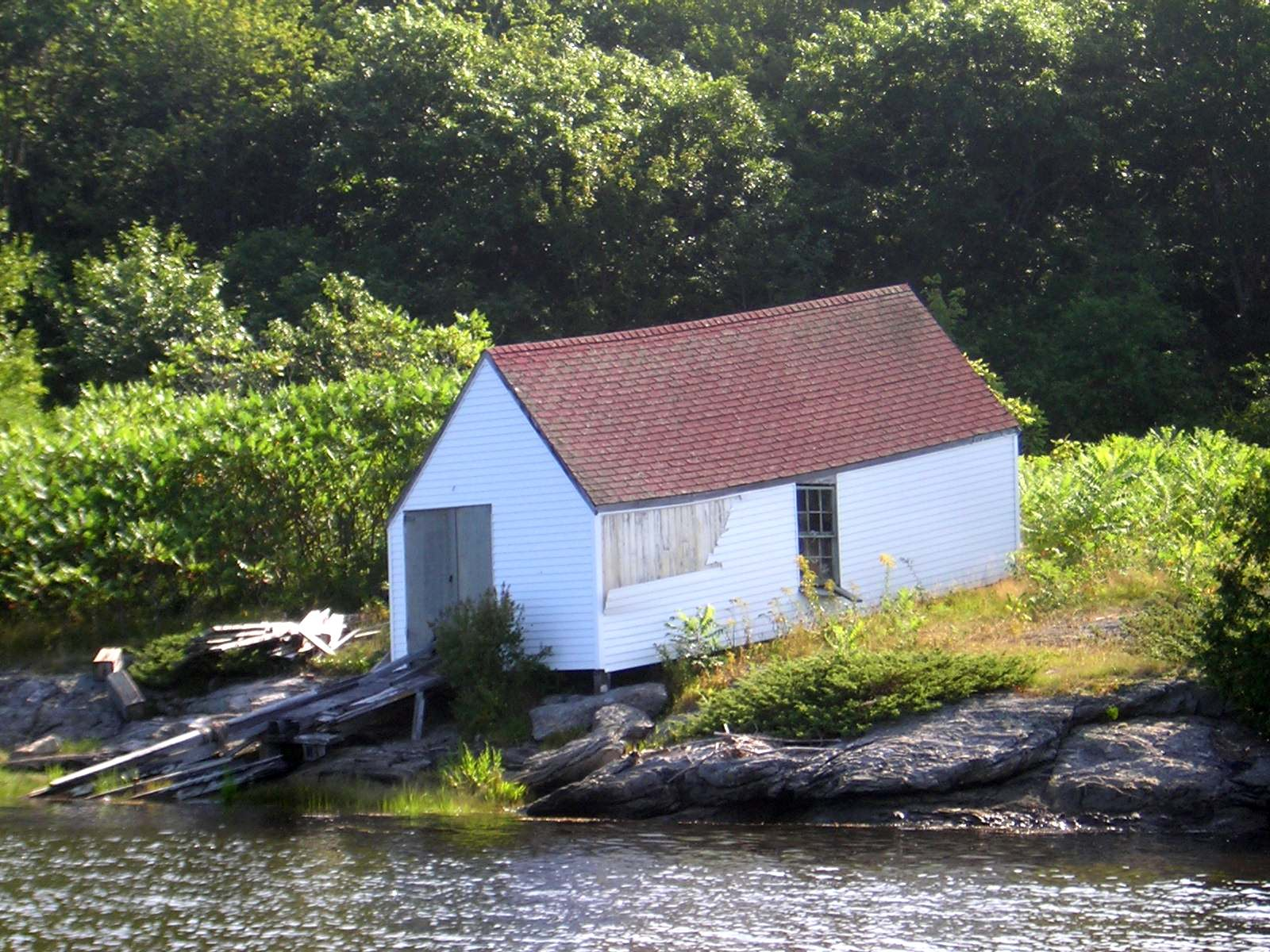
The boathouse — The ridge is parallel to the ground, but the ends and the window are vertical

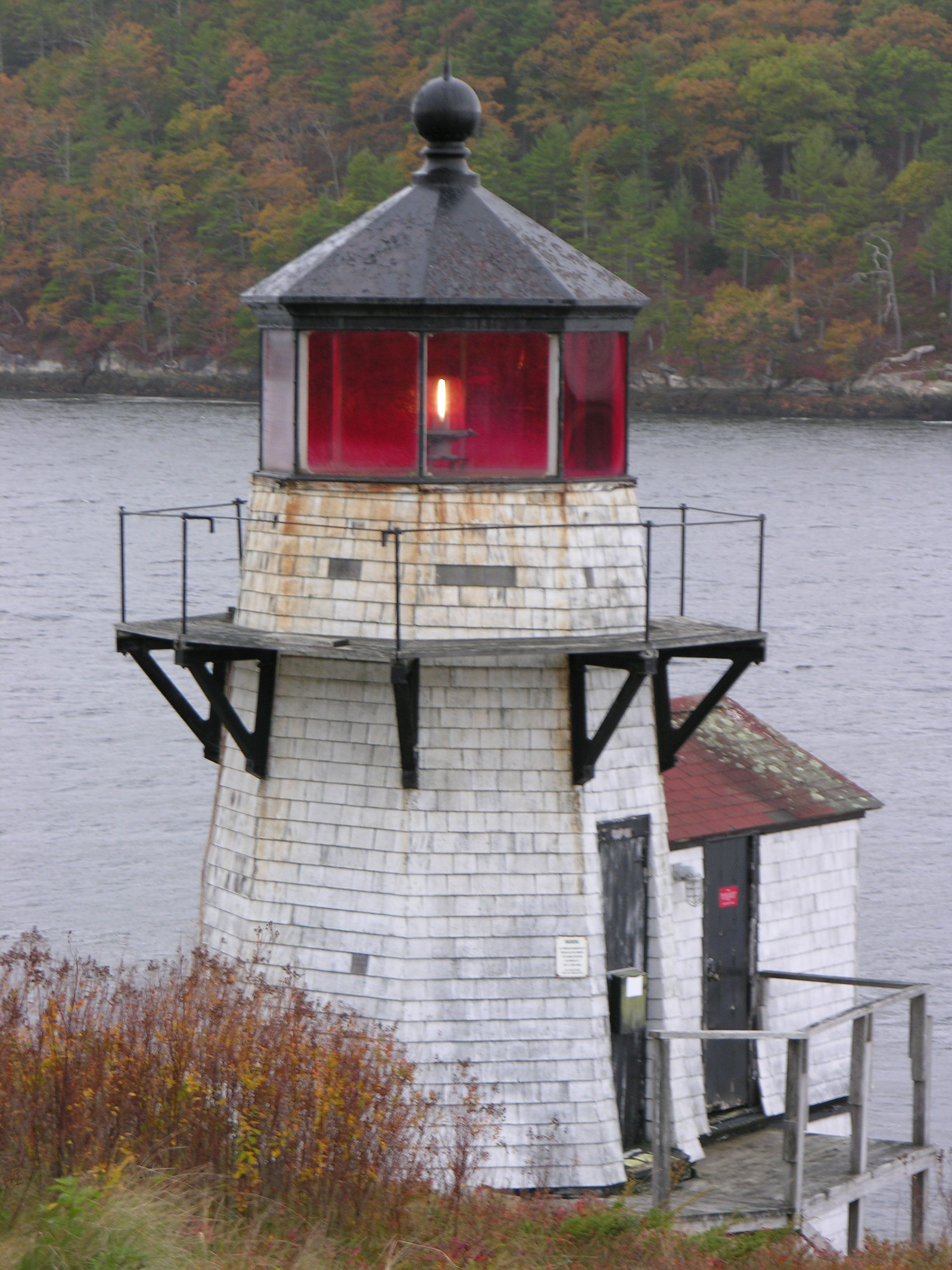
Daytime Squirrel Point Light with light on

== See also ==
- National Register of Historic Places listings in Sagadahoc County, Maine
