= Five Islands Lobster Company =

Restaurant in Georgetown, Maine, U.S.

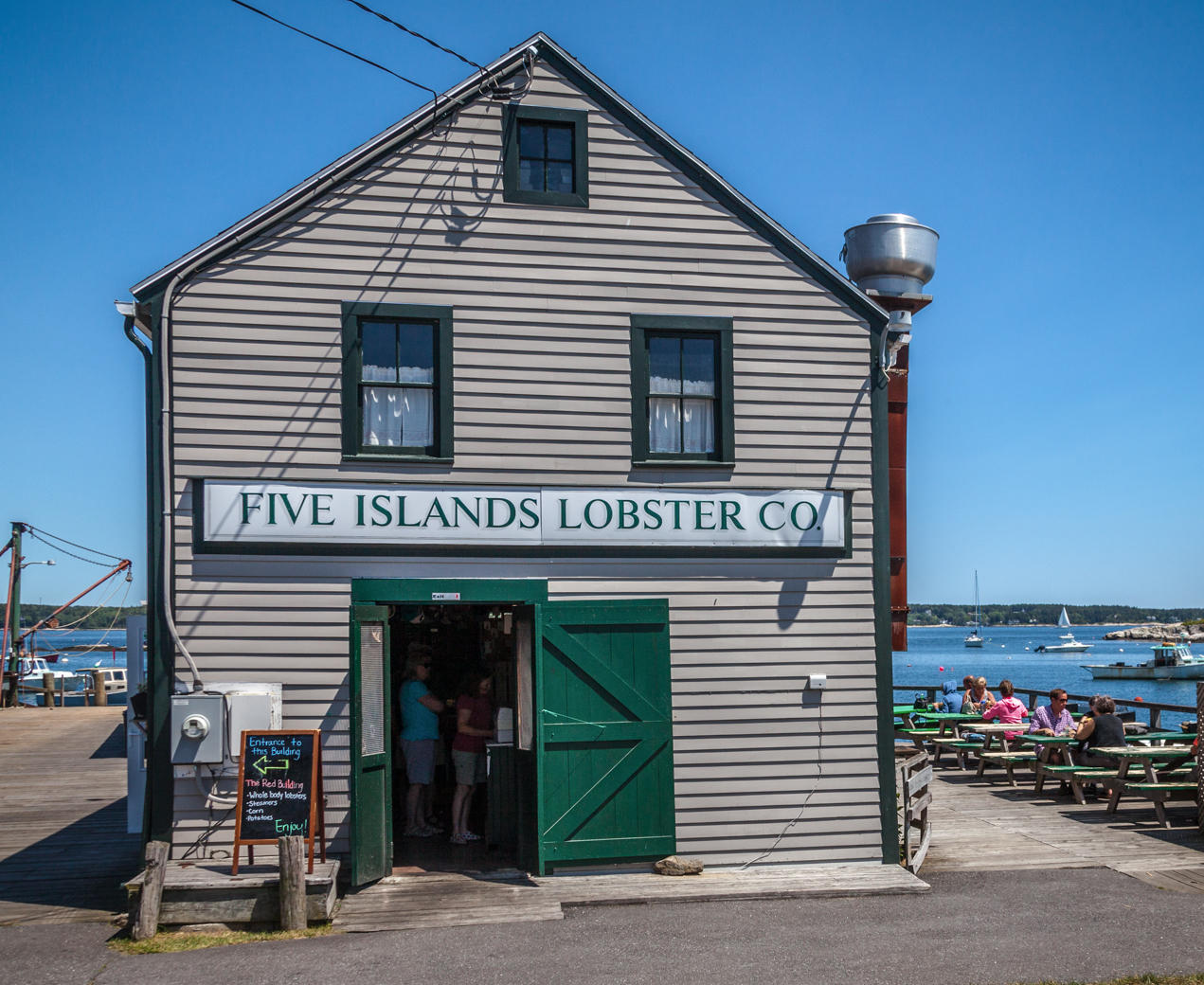
- Pictured in 2018
- Interactive map of Five Islands Lobster Company

Restaurant information
- Established: 2007 (19 years ago)
- Owner: Longbottom family
- Location: 1447 Five Islands Road, Georgetown, Sagadahoc County, Maine, 04548, United States
- Coordinates: 43.823869°N 69.709485°W
- Website: www.thurstonforlobster.com

Five Islands Lobster Company is a seafood restaurant in Georgetown, Maine, United States. Situated on Five Islands Road, overlooking the Sheepscot River, the business was established in 2007. In 2016, it was listed in Time magazine's "8 best seafood spots in New England". It was nominated in Down East magazine's "best of Maine" each year between 2023 and 2026.

The restaurant's owner, Keith Longbottom, died in 2019, aged 48. His family maintained the business but reduced its hours.

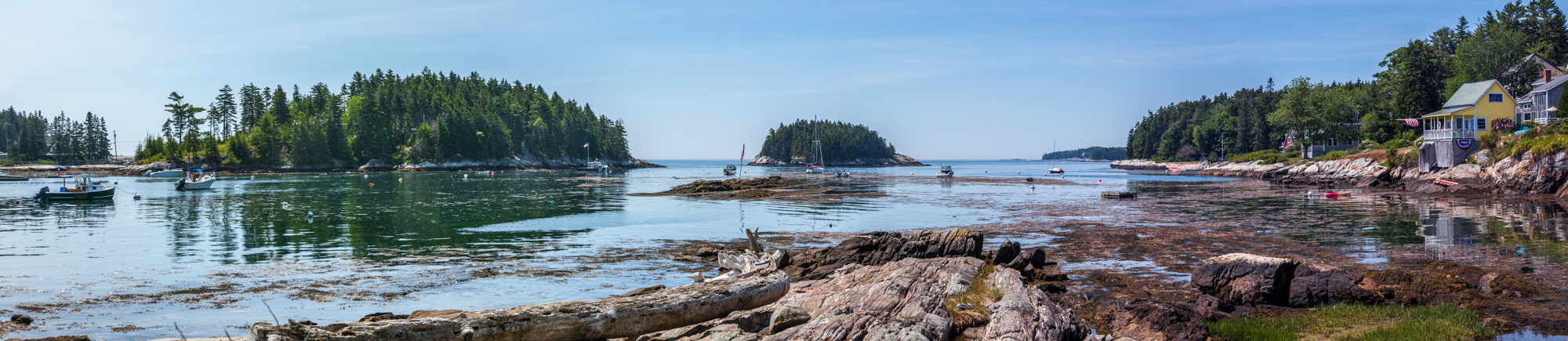
View from the restaurant over the Sheepscot River
