= Doubling Point Light =

Lighthouse in Maine, US

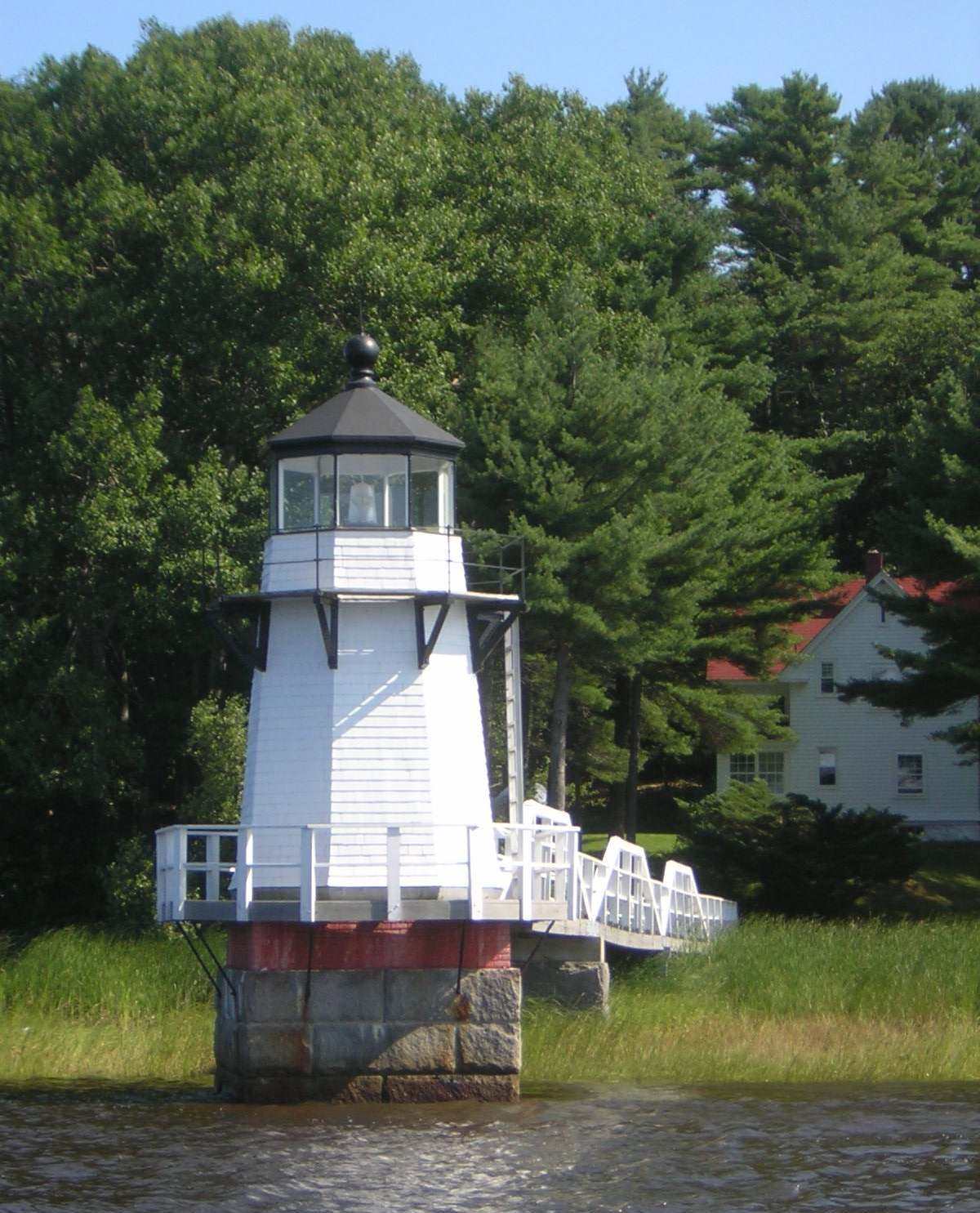
- The keeper's house is under the trees
- Location: Kennebec River, Arrowsic, Maine
- Coordinates: 43°52′57.0″N 69°48′24.5″W

Tower
- Constructed: 1898
- Construction: structural wood
- Automated: 1988
- Shape: Octagonal Wood Tower
- Markings: White
- Heritage: National Register of Historic Places listed place
- Fog signal: none

Light
- Focal height: 23 feet (7.0 m)
- Lens: fifth order Fresnel lens
- Range: 9 nautical miles (17 km; 10 mi)
- Characteristic: Fl W 4s
- Doubling Point Light Station
- U.S. National Register of Historic Places
- U.S. Historic district
- Nearest city: Bath, Maine
- Area: 4 acres (1.6 ha)
- Architect: U.S. Army Corps of Engineers
- MPS: Light Stations of Maine MPS
- NRHP reference No.: 87002271
- Added to NRHP: January 21, 1988

Doubling Point Light is a lighthouse on the Kennebec River in Arrowsic, Maine. It was established in 1898, fifteen years after the founding of the Bath Iron Works, a major shipbuilder, 1.5 miles (2.4 km) upriver. It was part of a major upgrade of the river's lights — the Doubling Point Light and the separate Range Lights on the point, Perkins Island Light, and Squirrel Point Light were all built at the same time. The light was listed on the National Register of Historic Places as Doubling Point Light Station on January 21, 1988. It remains an active aid to navigation.

== Description and history ==
The Doubling Point Light is located on the lower Kennebec River, at a point where the normally south-flowing river makes a sharp turn to the east, followed by a turn back to the south. The light is set at the inside corner of the first of these turns, on the west side of Arrowsic Island, roughly opposite the mouth of Winnegance Creek. The light station includes a tower, keeper's house, shed, and oil house. The tower is an octagonal wood-frame structure, finished in wooden shingles, with an iron walkway around the lantern chamber. It is accessed via a three-span footbridge.

Near the tower is the keeper's house, an L-shaped 1 1/2-story wood-frame structure with hip-roofed porches. Also nearby are the gable-roofed tool shed, built in 1898, and the small brick oilhouse, added in 1906.

The city of Bath, located north (upriver) from this point, had been a major shipbuilding port for much of the 19th century, and the river was a major transportation artery all the way to Augusta. In 1892 the river below Bath was identified by the United States Lighthouse Board as needing improved navigational aids, and a series of improvements were authorized. Funding was made available by Congress in 1895, and Doubling Point Light was built in 1898, along with the keeper's house and shed. The tower did not originally stand at its present location, to which it was moved in 1899, and the keeper's house was moved closer to the tower in 1901. The tower's original lens was a fifth-order Fresnel lens; it was automated in 1988.

== Gallery ==
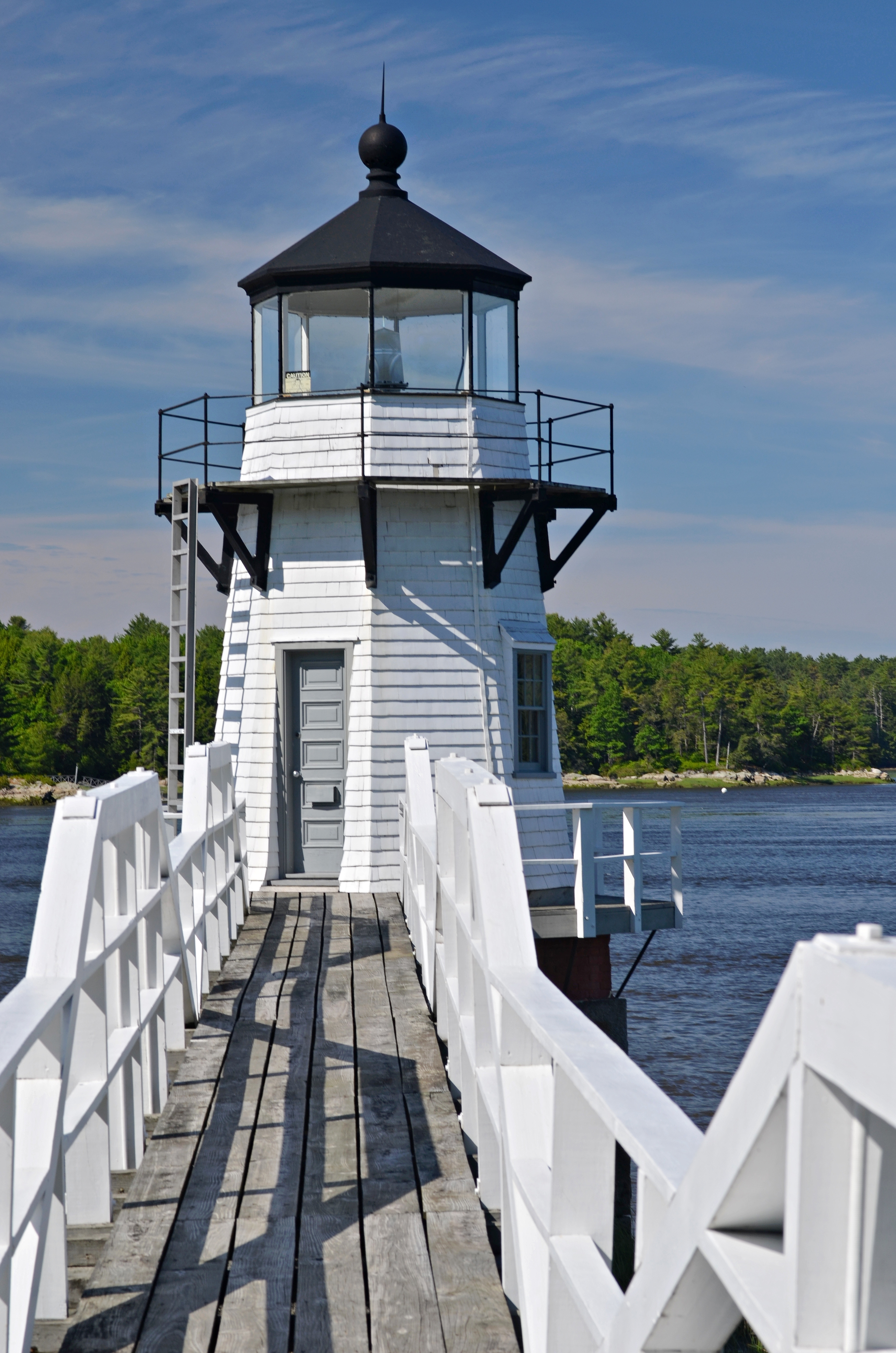
View from the access bridge to the light

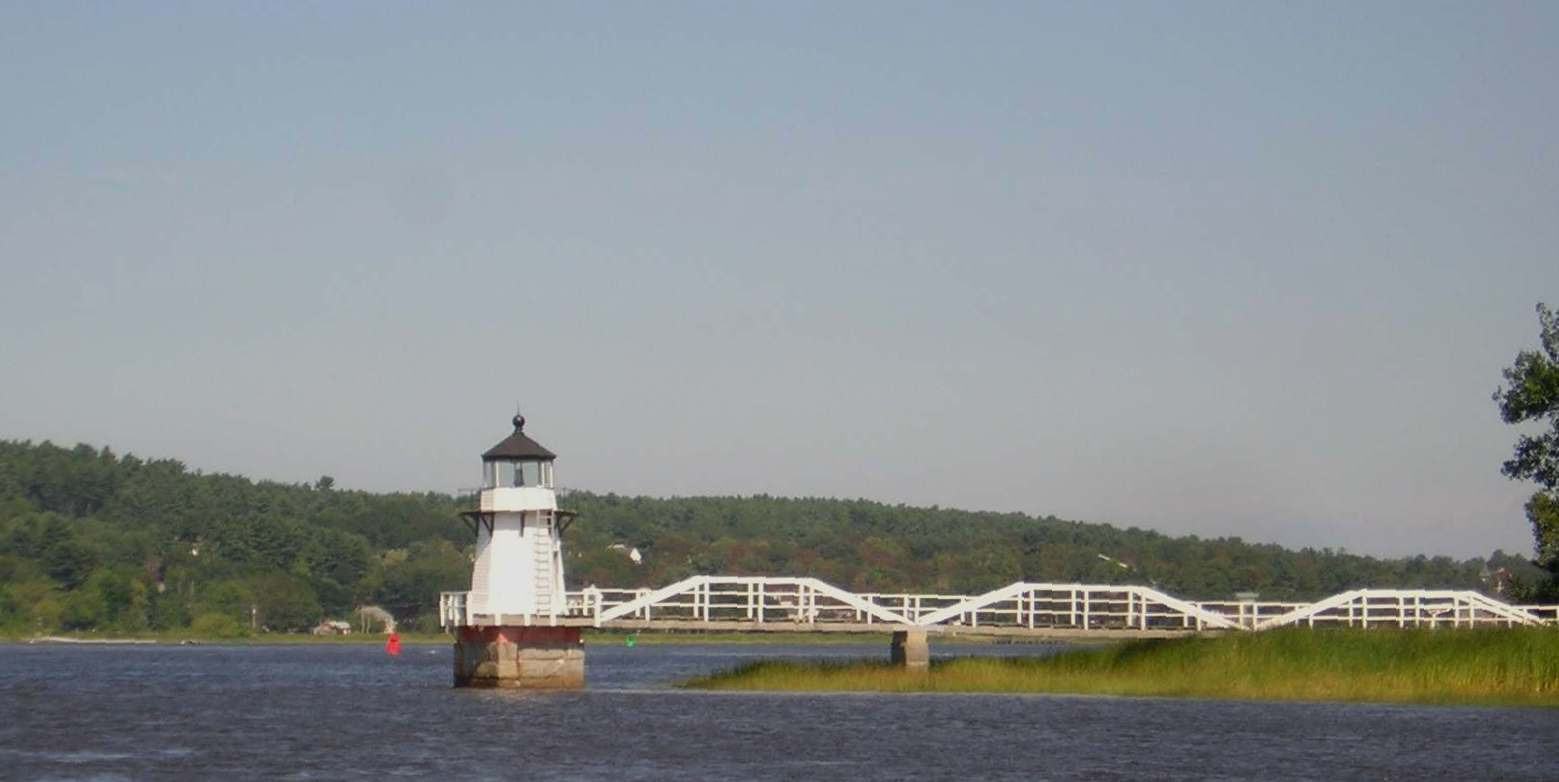
View from downriver, showing access bridge

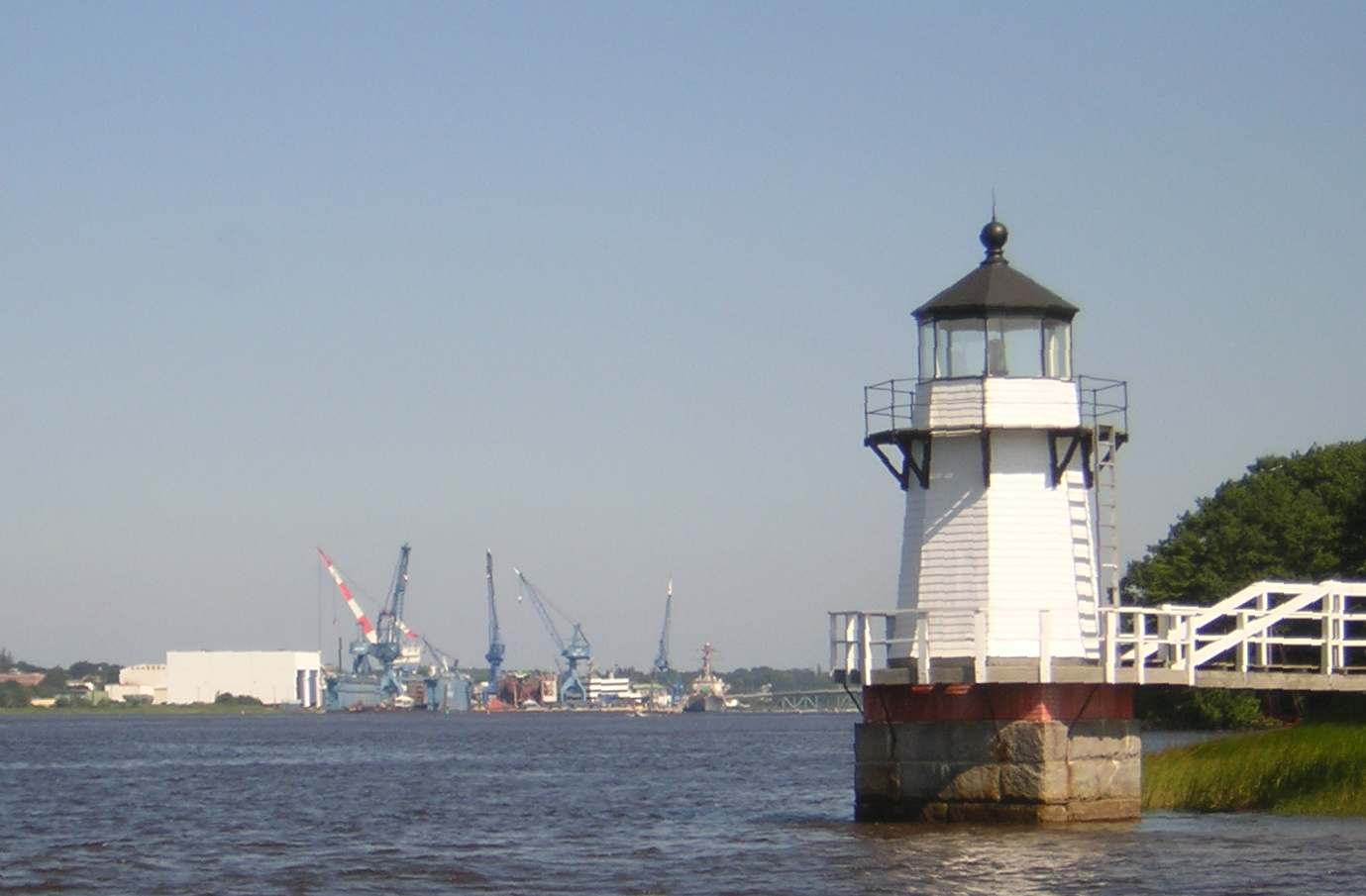
Bath Iron Works is about 1.5 km upriver of the light

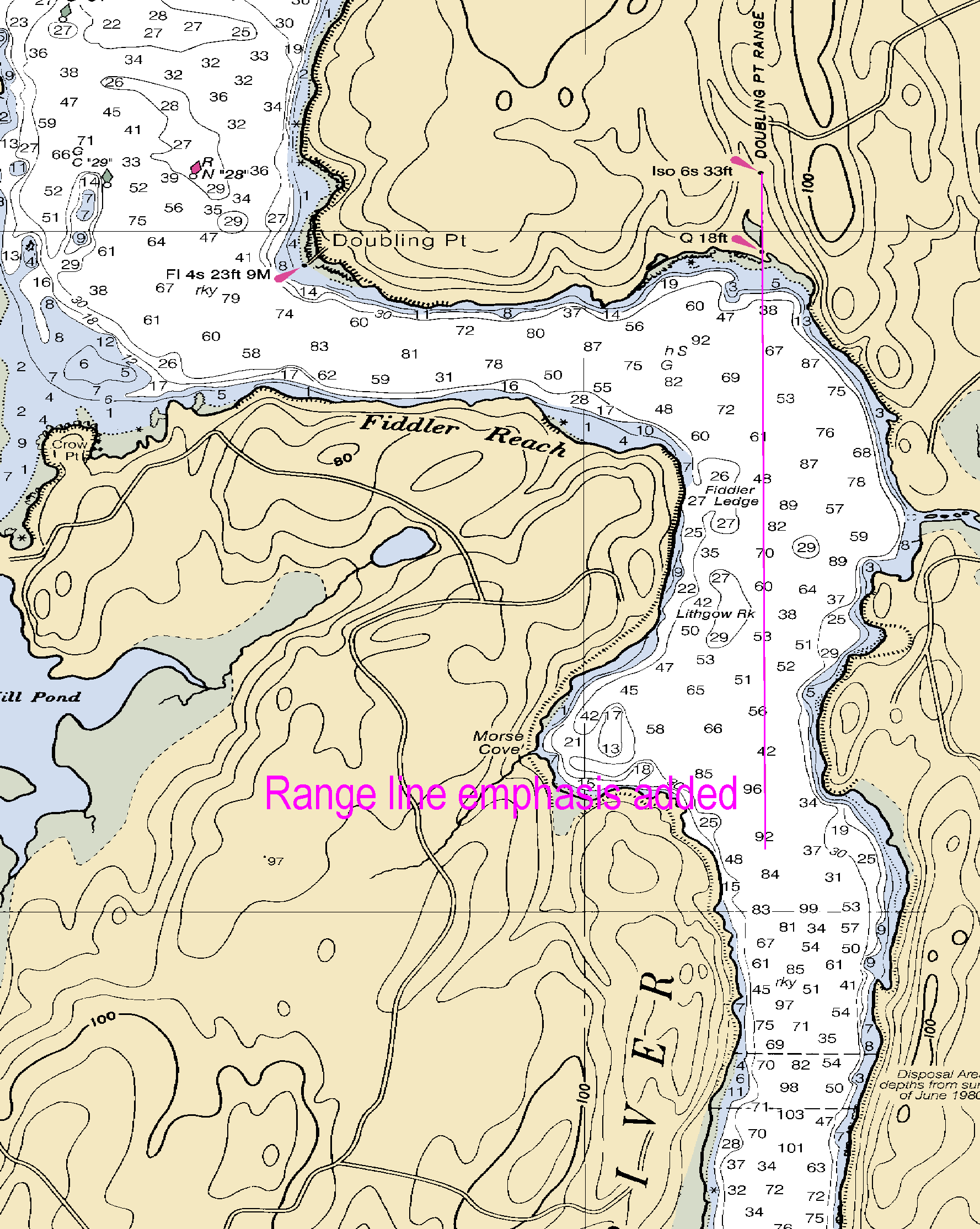
The light as shown on NOAA chart 13296

== See also ==
- Lighthouses in the United States
- National Register of Historic Places listings in Sagadahoc County, Maine
