= Arrowsic, Maine =

Town in Maine, United States

- Town
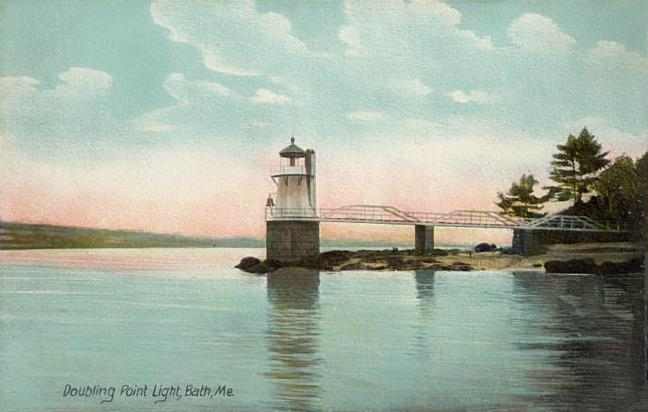
- Doubling Point Light c. 1907

- Location within Maine Location within the United States
- Coordinates: 43°52′32″N 69°47′12″W
- Country: United States
- State: Maine
- County: Sagadahoc
- Incorporated: 1841

Area
  - Total: 10.79 sq mi (27.95 km^{2})
  - Land: 7.75 sq mi (20.07 km^{2})
  - Water: 3.04 sq mi (7.87 km^{2})
- Elevation: 39 ft (12 m)

Population (2020)
  - Total: 477
  - Density: 62/sq mi (23.8/km^{2})
- Time zone: UTC-5 (Eastern (EST))
  - Summer (DST): UTC-4 (EDT)
- ZIP Code: 04530
- Area code: 207
- FIPS code: 23-01570
- GNIS feature ID: 582329
- Website: www.arrowsic.org

Arrowsic (/əˈroʊsɪk/, ə-ROH-sihk) is a town in Sagadahoc County, Maine, United States. The population is 477 as of the 2020 United States census. It is part of the Portland-South Portland-Biddeford metropolitan area. During the French and Indian Wars, Arrowsic was site of a succession of important and embattled colonial settlements.

== History ==
The Abenaki people called the island Arrowseag, meaning "place of obstruction," a reference to Upper Hell Gate on the Sasanoa River. Until it was widened by the Army Corps of Engineers in 1898 and 1908, the stretch was choked with boulders and ledges. Indian canoe passage would have been risky in the swift current between Merrymeeting Bay and Sheepscot Bay.

In 1649, John Richards purchased Arrowsic from the sachem Mowhotiwormet, commonly known as Chief Robinhood. Richards then sold it in 1654 to Major Thomas Clarke and Roger Spencer, the latter selling his share in 1657 to Captain Thomas Lake. Clarke and Lake were Boston merchants, who built at Spring Cove on the island's northeast corner a stockaded trading post and blockhouse protected by at least two great guns. In 1658–1659, land was cleared for pasturage, streets, a warehouse, sawmill, gristmill, bake house, blacksmith shop, cooperage and shipyard. Several large dwellings were erected, one called the Mansion House. Families and stocks of cattle were imported. The village became the local court of law, headquarters of the general council, and place of protection for settlers in the region.

But on August 14, 1676, during King Philip's War, the settlement was destroyed. The evening before, an Indian woman appeared at the door of the Clarke and Lake fort seeking shelter. She was admitted, and in the dead of night quietly opened the gate. In rushed warriors, and in the massacre which followed, 30 colonists were either killed and scalped or taken into captivity. Captain Thomas Lake, Sylvanus Davis and two others seized a canoe and paddled to Parker's Island (now Georgetown), where all but Lake escaped alive from their pursuers. As the warehouse was looted and village burned to ashes, a brave sported the captain's hat.

In 1679, returning settlers established a temporary settlement known as Sagadahoc on Stage Island, and petitioned the Massachusetts General Court for a permanent settlement on the southern end of Arrowsic Island. Governor Edmund Andros complied, granting 20 families Newtown. It was laid out with a common and, by order of the governor in 1688, a small, square palisaded fort on the ridge at the southern end of the island. But King William's War broke out in May 1689, and by July, Newtown was destroyed and its garrison abandoned.

Signed in 1713, the Treaty of Portsmouth brought a truce between the Eastern (Abenaki) Indians and English settlements. Newtown was reestablished in 1714, then incorporated in 1716 as Georgetown-on-Arrowsic, named after King George I. Eventually, the town's boundaries were extended to include Parker's Island, Stage Island and the Plantation of Nequasset (present-day Georgetown, Phippsburg, Bath, West Bath and Woolwich).

During this time Fort Menaskoux was built and Samuel Penhallow was the commander. Beginning on August 9, 1717, Massachusetts Governor Samuel Shute and Penhallow conducted a two-day conference on Arrowsic with delegates of various tribes, who arrived in a flotilla of canoes and encamped on Lee Island opposite the town. They objected to so many English forts in their territory, and Shute responded that he would build them wherever he thought necessary. Incidentally, the governor's boat Squirrel ran aground on what has been known since as Squirrel Point. All the Indians helped him get free.

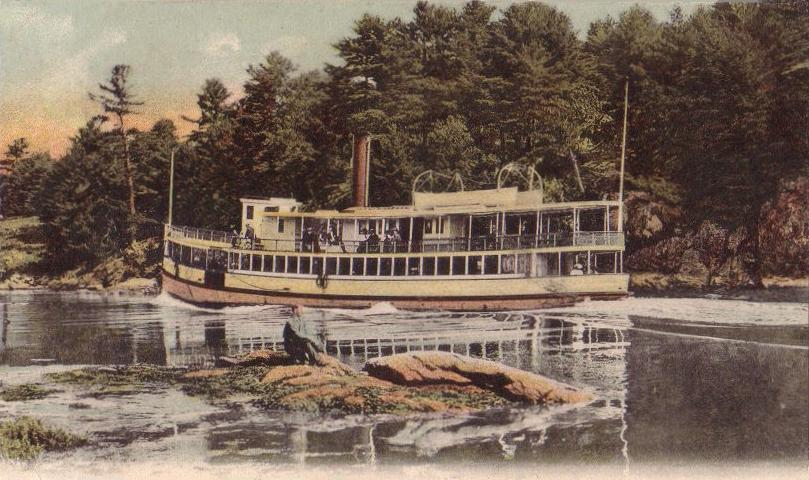
Upper Hell Gate in c. 1906

In the summer of 1723 during Dummer's War, Arrowsic was attacked by the Norridgewocks and their 250 Indian allies from Canada. Incited by French missionary Sebastien Rale, they burned 37 dwellings and killed 300 cattle. The 40 inhabitants fled to the garrison, with only a child lost. When the fort could not be taken, the Indians disappeared upriver. During the French and Indian War, on June 9, 1758, marauding Indians shot Ebenezer Preble and a workman as they tended his farm on the northern end of the island. They then attacked his garrison, killing his wife and carrying away their 5 children to be sold as servants in Canada. It would be the last Indian massacre on the Kennebec River; next year brought the Fall of Quebec. On February 17, 1841, Arrowsic Island was set off from Georgetown and incorporated as the town of Arrowsic.

== Geography ==
According to the United States Census Bureau, the town has a total area of 10.79 square miles (27.95 km^{2}), of which 7.75 square miles (20.07 km^{2}) is land and 3.04 square miles (7.87 km^{2}) is water. Arrowsic is on an island of the same name situated between the Kennebec River, Sasanoa River and Back River.

The community is served by Maine State Route 127. Separated by water, Arrowsic is near the towns of Woolwich to the north, Westport to the east, Georgetown to the southeast, Phippsburg to the southwest, and Bath to the northwest.

== Demographics ==
Historical population
Census	Pop.	Note	%±
1860	347		—
1870	252		−27.4%
1880	255		1.2%
1890	177		−30.6%
1900	180		1.7%
1910	147		−18.3%
1920	176		19.7%
1930	135		−23.3%
1940	167		23.7%
1950	172		3.0%
1960	177		2.9%
1970	188		6.2%
1980	305		62.2%
1990	498		63.3%
2000	477		−4.2%
2010	427		−10.5%
2020	477		11.7%
U.S. Decennial Census

=== 2010 census ===
As of the census of 2010, there were 427 people, 204 households, and 127 families living in the town. The population density was 55.1 inhabitants per square mile (21.3/km^{2}). There were 251 housing units at an average density of 32.4 per square mile (12.5/km^{2}). The racial makeup of the town was 98.6% White, 0.7% Native American, 0.5% Asian, and 0.2% from two or more races.

There were 204 households, of which 13.7% had children under the age of 18 living with them, 57.4% were married couples living together, 3.4% had a female householder with no husband present, 1.5% had a male householder with no wife present, and 37.7% were non-families. 29.9% of all households were made up of individuals, and 13.8% had someone living alone who was 65 years of age or older. The average household size was 2.09 and the average family size was 2.61.

The median age in the town was 55 years. 11.7% of residents were under the age of 18; 3.9% were between the ages of 18 and 24; 15.1% were from 25 to 44; 45.5% were from 45 to 64; and 23.7% were 65 years of age or older. The gender makeup of the town was 49.2% male and 50.8% female.

=== 2000 census ===
As of the census of 2000, there were 477 people, 196 households, and 137 families living in the town. The population density was 61.3 inhabitants per square mile (23.7/km^{2}). There were 238 housing units at an average density of 30.6 per square mile (11.8/km^{2}). The racial makeup of the town was 98.53% White, and 1.47% from two or more races.

There were 196 households, out of which 31.6% had children under the age of 18 living with them, 63.8% were married couples living together, 3.1% had a female householder with no husband present, and 29.6% were non-families. 21.9% of all households were made up of individuals, and 7.1% had someone living alone who was 65 years of age or older. The average household size was 2.43 and the average family size was 2.85.

In the town, the population was spread out, with 23.1% under the age of 18, 3.8% from 18 to 24, 25.8% from 25 to 44, 35.8% from 45 to 64, and 11.5% who were 65 years of age or older. The median age was 44 years. For every 100 females, there were 95.5 males. For every 100 females age 18 and over, there were 92.1 males.

The median income for a household in the town was $53,250, and the median income for a family was $61,875. Males had a median income of $36,023 versus $31,458 for females. The per capita income for the town was $29,597. None of the families and 1.2% of the population were living below the poverty line, including no under eighteens and none of those over 64.

== Sites of interest ==
- Bald Head Preserve
- Doubling Point Light
- Squirrel Point Light
- Arrowsic Island Pottery
- Sewell Pond

== See also ==
- List of islands of Maine
