= Georgetown, Maine =

- Town
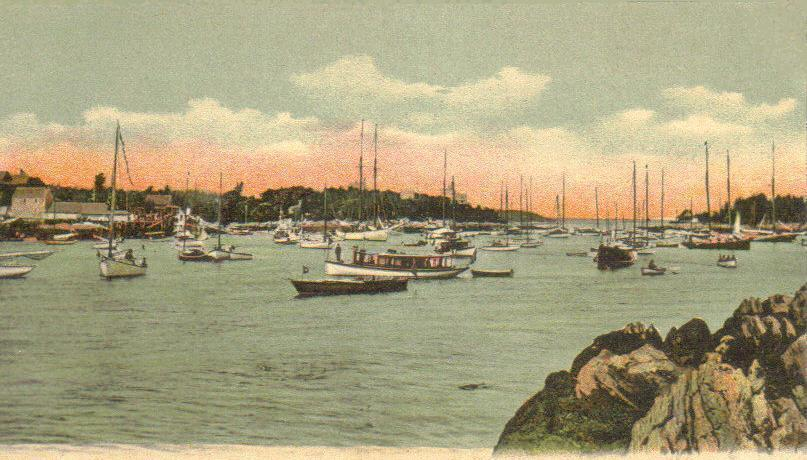
- Five Islands, Georgetown, ME; from a c. 1906 postcard

- Seal

- Location within Maine Location within the United States
- Coordinates: 43°45′40″N 69°44′36″W
- Country: United States
- State: Maine
- County: Sagadahoc
- Incorporated: 1716

Area
  - Total: 64.56 sq mi (167.21 km^{2})
  - Land: 18.58 sq mi (48.12 km^{2})
  - Water: 45.98 sq mi (119.09 km^{2})
- Elevation: 0 ft (0 m)

Population (2020)
  - Total: 1,058
  - Density: 57/sq mi (22/km^{2})
- Time zone: UTC−5 (Eastern (EST))
  - Summer (DST): UTC−4 (EDT)
- ZIP Code: 04548
- Area code: 207
- FIPS code: 23-27295
- GNIS feature ID: 582489
- Website: www.georgetownme.com

Georgetown is a town in Sagadahoc County, Maine, United States. The population was 1,058 at the 2020 census. Home to Reid State Park, the town is part of the Portland-South Portland-Biddeford metropolitan area. Located on an island accessible by car from the mainland, Georgetown includes the villages of Five Islands, Georgetown, Bay Point, Marrtown, West Georgetown and Robinhood. It is a popular tourist destination.

== History ==
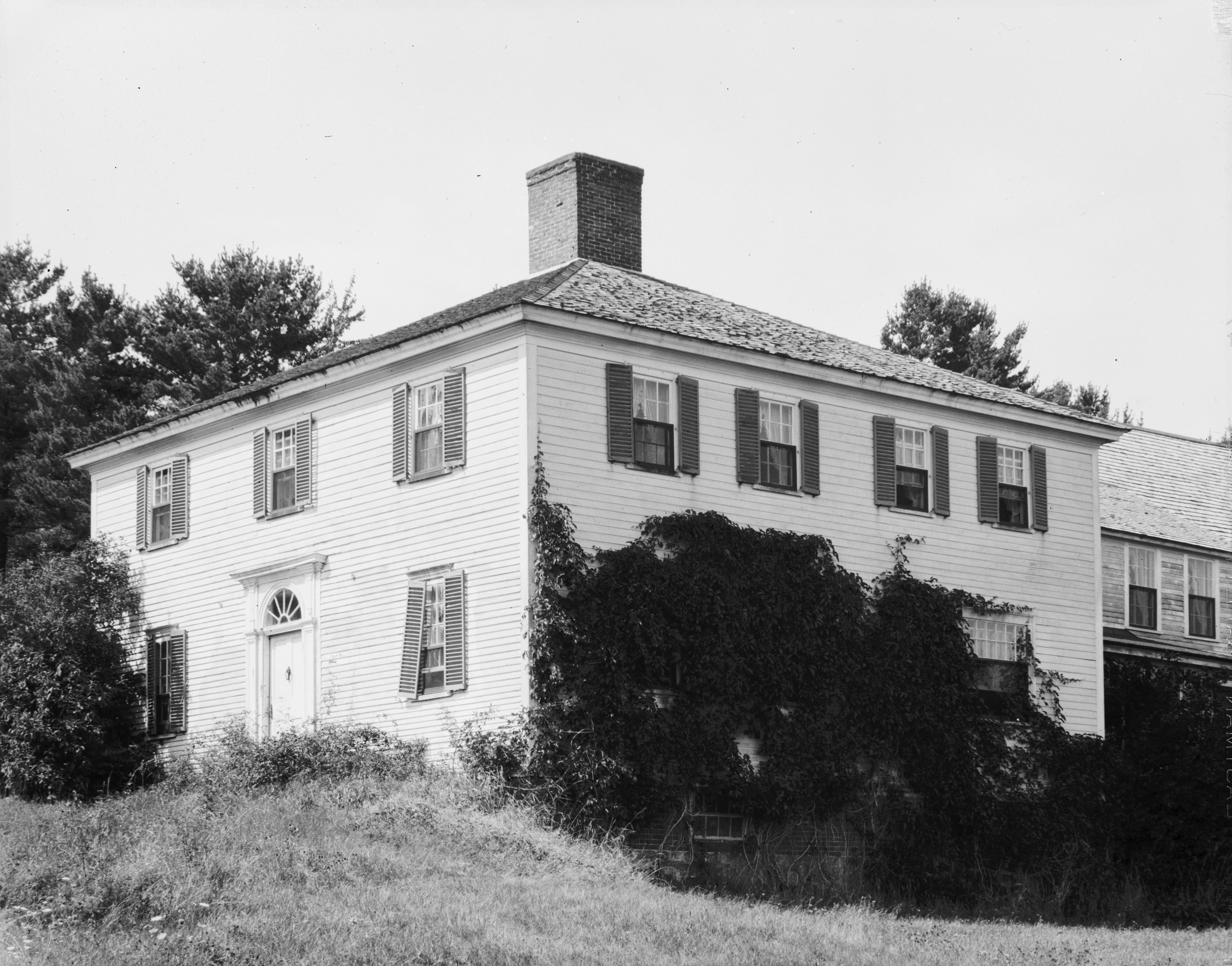
Front of the Benjamin Riggs House, located along Robinhood Road in Georgetown. Built in 1790, it is listed on the National Register of Historic Places

The Abenaki called the island Erascohegan, possibly meaning "good spear-fishing." Other interpretations of the word suggest that it meant "a watching place." John Parker, a fisherman from Bedfordshire, England, purchased it in 1649 from Chief Mowhotiwormet, commonly known as Chief Robinhood, for a hogshead of rum and some pumpkins. Parker built the first permanent homestead on what eventually became known as Parker's Island.

The Kennebec River valley was attacked and burned in 1676 during King Philip's War, then again in 1689 at the outset of King William's War, and was not resettled until after the 1713 Treaty of Portsmouth. The town of Newtown-on-Arrowsic was rebuilt in 1714 on the southern end of Arrowsic Island, which was incorporated in 1716 by the Massachusetts General Court as Georgetown-on-Arrowsic, named for Fort St. George. The town's boundaries were extended to encompass Parker's Island, Woolwich, Phippsburg and Bath (which included West Bath). Abandoned during Dummer's War and beleaguered during the French and Indian Wars, the region resettled slowly in the 1750s until peace was assured with the 1759 Fall of Quebec.

About half of Parker's Island provided grazing land, and some residents raised livestock and produced butter and cheese. In 1858, there were two sawmills, two shingle mills, a pailmaker and a shipbuilder. But the merchant marine and fishing were the town's principal occupations. By 1841, all the other parts of Georgetown had been set off and incorporated as towns, leaving Parker's Island with sole claim to the ancient name. Situated between the mouths of the Sheepscot and Kennebec rivers on the Gulf of Maine, Georgetown developed into a summer resort, attracting a number of prominent artists. The island is a noted site for bird watching.

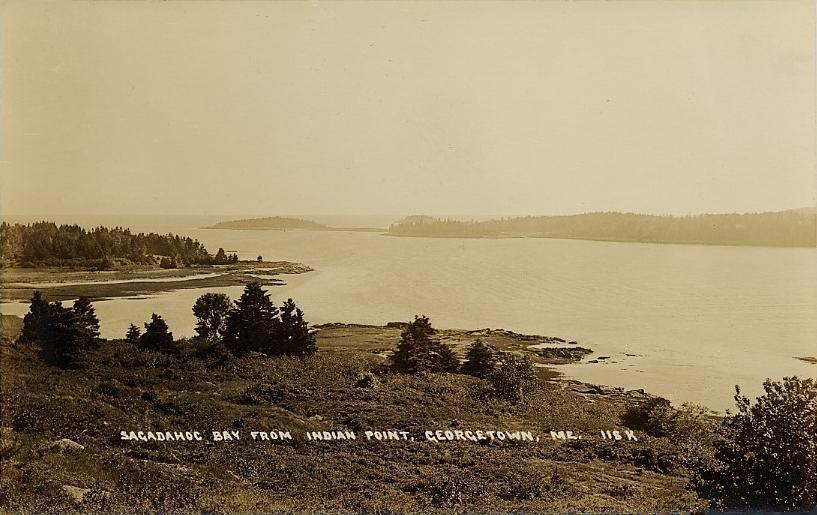
Sagadahoc Bay c. 1915

== Geography ==
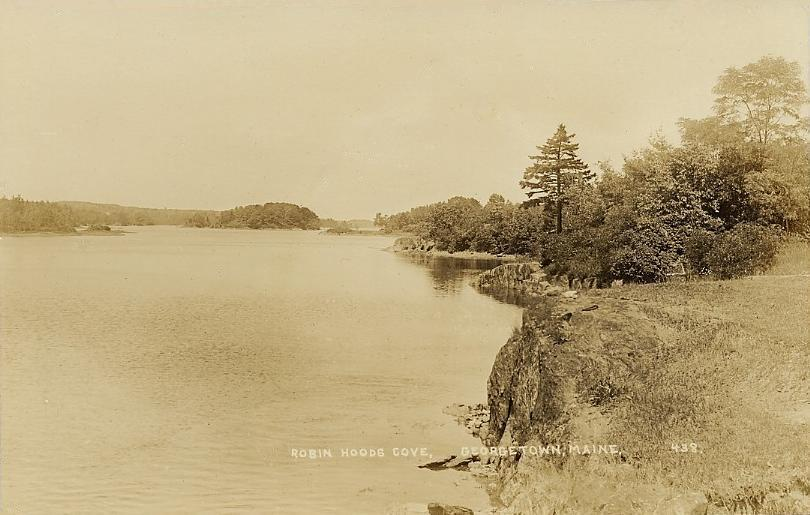
Robinhood Cove c. 1915

According to the United States Census Bureau, the town has a total area of 64.56 square miles (167.21 km^{2}), of which, 18.58 square miles (48.12 km^{2}) of it is land and 45.98 square miles (119.09 km^{2}) is water. Georgetown is located on an island near the mouth of the Kennebec River and Gulf of Maine, part of the Atlantic Ocean.

It is crossed by Maine State Route 127. The island is separated by water from Westport to the northeast, Southport to the east, Phippsburg to the west, Arrowsic to the northwest, and Woolwich to the north.

== Demographics ==
Historical population
Census	Pop.	Note	%±
1790	1,333		—
1800	1,534		15.1%
1810	1,998		30.2%
1820	1,165		−41.7%
1830	1,258		8.0%
1840	1,356		7.8%
1850	1,121		−17.3%
1860	1,254		11.9%
1870	1,135		−9.5%
1880	1,080		−4.8%
1890	849		−21.4%
1900	799		−5.9%
1910	742		−7.1%
1920	429		−42.2%
1930	361		−15.9%
1940	420		16.3%
1950	510		21.4%
1960	490		−3.9%
1970	464		−5.3%
1980	735		58.4%
1990	914		24.4%
2000	1,020		11.6%
2010	1,042		2.2%
2020	1,058		1.5%
U.S. Decennial Census

=== 2010 census ===
As of the census of 2010, there were 1,042 people, 469 households, and 298 families residing in the town. The population density was 56.1 inhabitants per square mile (21.7/km^{2}). There were 1,044 housing units at an average density of 56.2 per square mile (21.7/km^{2}). The racial makeup of the town was 97.1% White, 0.4% African American, 0.1% Native American, 0.8% Asian, 0.2% from other races, and 1.4% from two or more races. Hispanic or Latino of any race were 0.7% of the population.

There were 469 households, of which 22.2% had children under the age of 18 living with them, 55.7% were married couples living together, 5.1% had a female householder with no husband present, 2.8% had a male householder with no wife present, and 36.5% were non-families. 29.9% of all households were made up of individuals, and 11.3% had someone living alone who was 65 years of age or older. The average household size was 2.22 and the average family size was 2.77.

The median age in the town was 49.6 years. 18.6% of residents were under the age of 18; 4.5% were between the ages of 18 and 24; 19.6% were from 25 to 44; 37% were from 45 to 64; and 20.3% were 65 years of age or older. The gender makeup of the town was 50.1% male and 49.9% female.

=== 2000 census ===
As of the census of 2000, there were 1,020 people, 441 households, and 287 families residing in the town. The population density was 54.4 inhabitants per square mile (21.0/km^{2}). There were 931 housing units at an average density of 49.7 per square mile (19.2/km^{2}). The racial makeup of the town was 98.92% White, 0.10% African American, 0.49% Asian, 0.10% from other races, and 0.39% from two or more races. Hispanic or Latino of any race were 0.98% of the population.

There were 441 households, out of which 24.9% had children under the age of 18 living with them, 57.1% were married couples living together, 5.7% had a female householder with no husband present, and 34.9% were non-families. 27.7% of all households were made up of individuals, and 9.8% had someone living alone who was 65 years of age or older. The average household size was 2.31 and the average family size was 2.84.

In the town, the population was spread out, with 21.3% under the age of 18, 6.7% from 18 to 24, 26.3% from 25 to 44, 29.4% from 45 to 64, and 16.4% who were 65 years of age or older. The median age was 42 years. For every 100 females, there were 94.7 males. For every 100 females age 18 and over, there were 97.3 males.

The median income for a household in the town was $47,813, and the median income for a family was $58,438. Males had a median income of $39,028 versus $24,792 for females. The per capita income for the town was $24,709. About 3.9% of families and 6.8% of the population were below the poverty line, including 5.0% of those under age 18 and 5.2% of those age 65 or over.

== Notable people ==
- Pat Burns, businessman, philanthropist
- Marsden Hartley, artist
- Dahlov Ipcar, artist and children's author, daughter of Marguerite and William Zorach
- Gaston Lachaise, sculptor
- William Lithgow, judge and colonial military officer
- Arthur Noble, colonial military officer
- Bruce Poliquin, congressman and state treasurer
- Laura E. Richards, children's author
- Marguerite Zorach, artist
- William Zorach, artist

== Education ==
Georgetown Central School

== Sites of interest ==
- Ledgemere Nature Preserve
- Georgetown Historical Society & Museum
- Josephine Newman Wildlife Sanctuary
- Perkins Island Light
- Reid State Park
- Seguin Island Light
- Five Islands Lobster Company
