= Slot machine =

Casino gambling machine

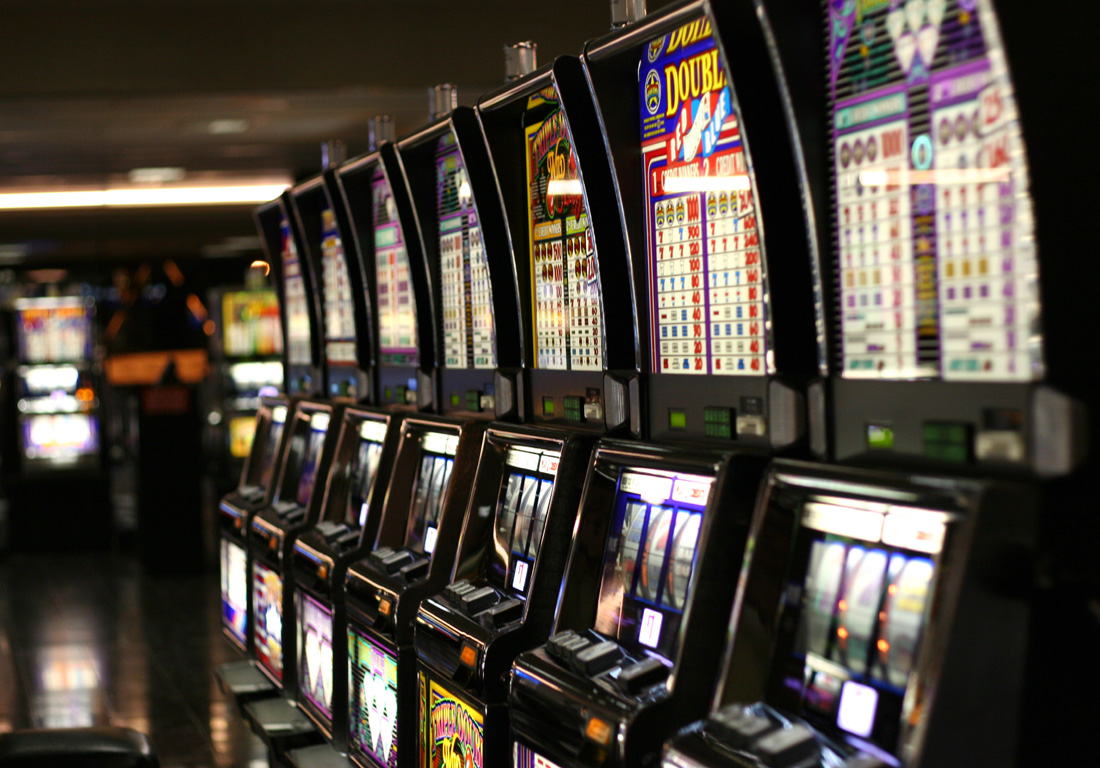
Row of slot machines inside a Las Vegas casino

A slot machine, fruit machine (British English), puggie (Scots), poker machine or pokie machine (Australian and New Zealand English) is a gambling machine that creates a game of chance for its customers.

A slot machine's standard layout features a screen displaying three or more reels that "spin" when the game is activated. Some modern slot machines still include a lever as a skeuomorphic design trait to trigger play. However, the mechanical operations of early machines have been superseded by random number generators, and most are now operated using buttons and touchscreens.

Slot machines include one or more currency detectors that validate the form of payment, whether coin, banknote, voucher, or token. The machine pays out according to the pattern of symbols displayed when the reels stop "spinning". Slot machines are the most popular gambling method in casinos and contribute about 70% of the average U.S. casino's income.

Digital technology has resulted in variations in the original slot machine concept. As the player is essentially playing a video game, manufacturers can offer more interactive elements, such as advanced bonus rounds and more varied video graphics. Slot machines' terminology, characteristics, and regulation vary by country of manufacture and use.

== Terms and their sources ==
The "slot machine" term derives from the slots on the machine for inserting and retrieving coins. "Fruit machine" comes from the traditional fruit images on the spinning reels such as lemons and cherries. Slot machines are also known pejoratively as "one-armed bandits", alluding to the large mechanical levers affixed to the sides of early mechanical machines, and to the games' ability to empty players' pockets and wallets as thieves would.

== History ==
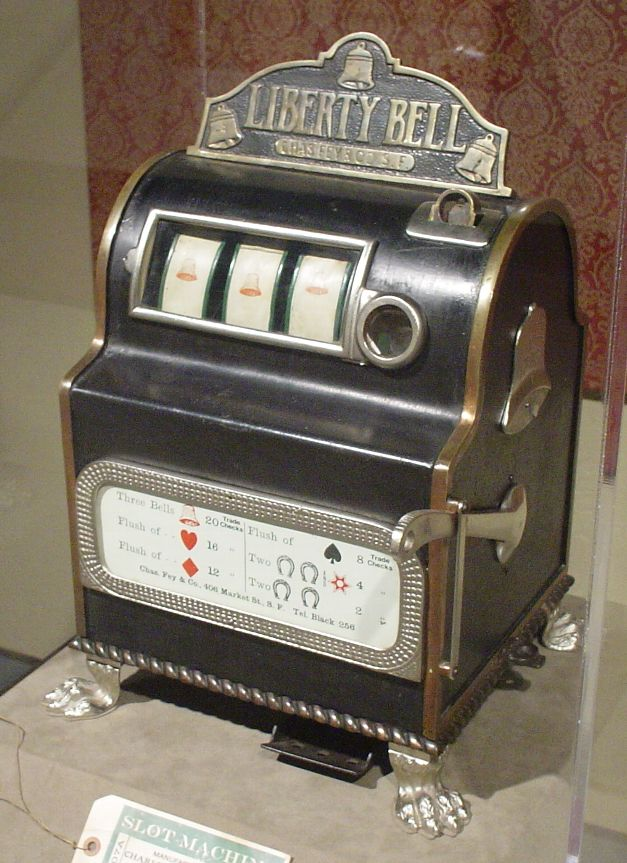
1899 "Liberty Bell" machine, manufactured by Charles Fey

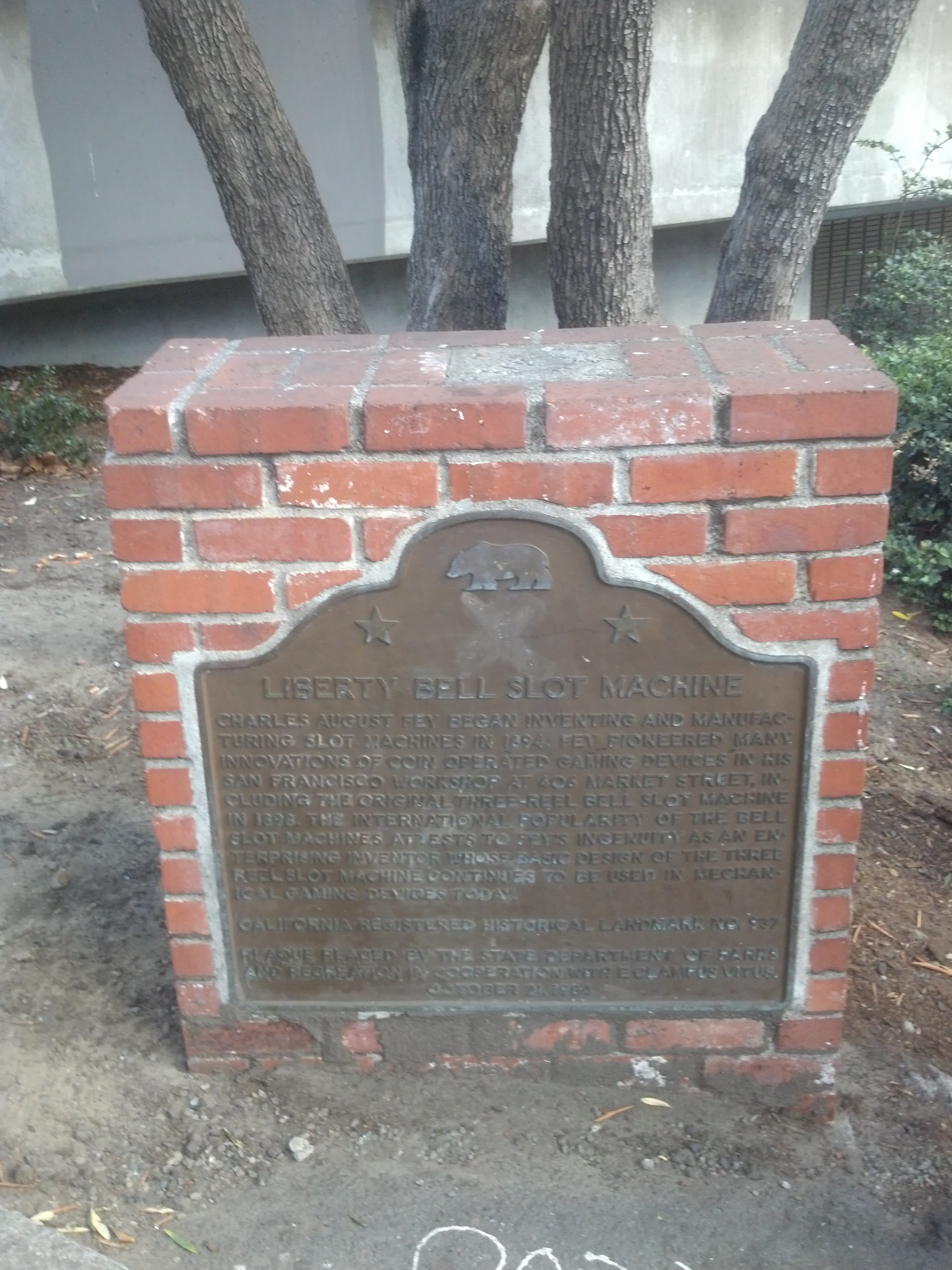
Plaque marking the location of Charles Fey's San Francisco workshop, where he invented the three-reel slot machine. The location is a California Historical Landmark.

In the 1890s a number of patents were taken out on gambling machines that were precursors to the modern slot machine, most notably an 1893 design by Sittman and Pitt of Brooklyn, New York. It contained five drums holding a total of 50 card faces and was based on poker. The machine proved extremely popular, and soon many bars in the city had one or more of them. Players would insert a nickel and pull a lever, which would spin the drums and the cards that they held, the player hoping for a good poker hand. There was no direct payout mechanism, so a pair of kings might get the player a free beer, whereas a royal flush could pay out cigars or drinks; the prizes were wholly dependent upon what the establishment would offer. To improve the odds for the house, two cards were typically removed from the deck, the ten of spades and the jack of hearts, doubling the odds against winning a royal flush. The drums could also be rearranged to further reduce a player's chance of winning.

Because of the vast number of possible wins in the original poker-based game, it proved practically impossible to make a machine capable of awarding an automatic payout for all possible winning combinations. At some time between 1887 and 1895, Charles Fey of San Francisco, California, devised a much simpler automatic mechanism with three spinning reels containing a total of five symbols: horseshoes, diamonds, spades, hearts and a Liberty Bell; the bell gave the machine its name. By replacing ten cards with five symbols and using three reels instead of five drums, the complexity of reading a win was considerably reduced, allowing Fey to design an effective automatic payout mechanism. Three bells in a row produced the biggest payoff, ten nickels (50¢). Liberty Bell was a huge success and spawned a thriving mechanical gaming device industry. After a few years, the devices were banned in California, but Fey still could not keep up with the demand for them elsewhere. The Liberty Bell machine was so popular that it was copied by many slot machine manufacturers. The first of these, also called the "Liberty Bell", was produced by the manufacturer Herbert Mills in 1907. By 1908, "bell" machines had been installed in cigar stores, brothels and barber shops. Early machines, including an 1899 Liberty Bell, are now part of the Nevada State Museum's Fey Collection.

The first Liberty Bell machines produced by Mills used the same symbols on the reels as did Charles Fey's original. Soon afterward, another version was produced with patriotic symbols, such as flags and wreaths, on the wheels. Later, a similar machine called the Operator's Bell was produced that included the option of adding a gum-vending attachment. As the gum offered was fruit-flavored, fruit symbols were placed on the reels: lemons, cherries, oranges and plums. A bell was retained, and a picture of a stick of Bell-Fruit Gum, the origin of the bar symbol, was also present. This set of symbols proved highly popular and was used by other companies that began to make their own slot machines: Caille, Watling, Jennings and Pace.

A commonly used technique to avoid gambling laws in several states was to award food prizes. For this reason, several gumball and other vending machines were regarded with mistrust by the courts. The two Iowa cases of State v. Ellis and State v. Striggles are both used in criminal law classes to illustrate the concept of reliance upon authority as it relates to the axiomatic ignorantia juris non excusat ("ignorance of the law is no excuse"). In these cases, a mint vending machine was declared to be a gambling device because the machine would, by internally manufactured chance, occasionally give the next user several tokens exchangeable for more candy. Despite the display of the result of the next use on the machine, the courts ruled that "[t]he machine appealed to the player's propensity to gamble, and that is [a] vice."

In 1963, Bally developed the first fully electromechanical slot machine called Money Honey (although earlier machines such as Bally's High Hand draw-poker machine had exhibited the basics of electromechanical construction as early as 1940). Its electromechanical workings made Money Honey the first slot machine with a bottomless hopper and automatic payout of up to 500 coins without the help of an attendant. The popularity of this machine led to the increasing predominance of electronic games, with the side lever soon becoming vestigial.

The first video slot machine was developed in 1976 in Kearny Mesa, California, by the Las Vegas–based Fortune Coin Co. This machine used a modified 19-inch (48 cm) Sony Trinitron color receiver for the display and logic boards for all slot-machine functions. The prototype was mounted in a full-size, show-ready slot-machine cabinet. The first production units went on trial at the Las Vegas Hilton Hotel. After some modifications to defeat cheating attempts, the video slot machine was approved by the Nevada State Gaming Commission and eventually found popularity on the Las Vegas Strip and in downtown casinos. Fortune Coin Co. and its video slot-machine technology were purchased by IGT (International Gaming Technology) in 1978.

The first American video slot machine to offer a "second screen" bonus round was Reel 'Em In, developed by WMS Industries in 1996. This type of machine had appeared in Australia from at least 1994 with the Three Bags Full game. With this type of machine, the display changes to provide a different game in which an additional payout may be awarded.

== Operation ==
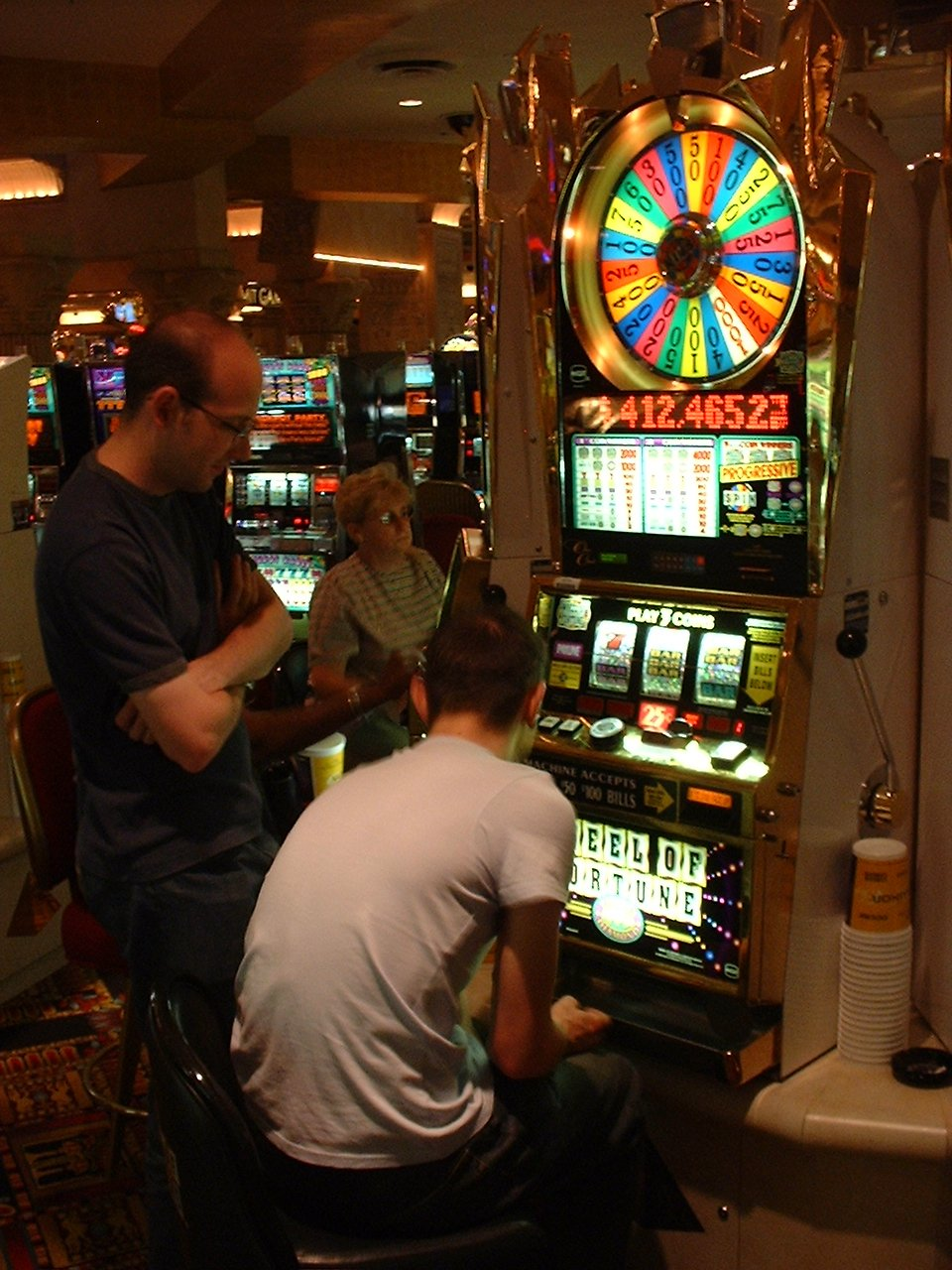
Gamblers at a slot machine in Paradise, Nevada

Depending on the machine, the player can insert cash or, in "ticket-in, ticket-out" machines, a paper ticket with a barcode, into a designated slot on the machine. The machine is then activated by means of a lever or button (either physical or on a touchscreen), which activates reels that spin and stop to rearrange the symbols. If a player matches a winning combination of symbols, the player earns credits based on the paytable. Symbols vary depending on the theme of the machine. Classic symbols include objects such as fruits, bells, and stylized lucky sevens. Most slot games have a theme, such as a specific style, location, or character. Symbols and other bonus features of the game are typically aligned with the theme. Some themes are licensed from popular media franchises, including films, television series (including game shows such as Wheel of Fortune, which has been one of the most popular lines of slot machines overall), entertainers, and musicians.

Multi-line slot machines have become more popular since the 1990s. These machines have more than one payline, meaning that visible symbols that are not aligned on the main horizontal may be considered as winning combinations. Traditional three-reel slot machines commonly have one, three, or five paylines while video slot machines may have 9, 15, 25, or as many as 1024 different paylines. Most accept variable numbers of credits to play, with 1 to 15 credits per line being typical. The higher the amount bet, the higher the payout will be if the player wins.

One of the main differences between video slot machines and reel machines is in the way payouts are calculated. With reel machines, the only way to win the maximum jackpot is to play the maximum number of coins (usually three, sometimes four or even five coins per spin). With video machines, the fixed payout values are multiplied by the number of coins per line that is being bet. In other words: on a reel machine, the odds are more favorable if the gambler plays with the maximum number of coins available. However, depending on the structure of the game and its bonus features, some video slots may still include features that improve chances at payouts by making increased wagers.

"Multi-way" games eschew fixed paylines in favor of allowing symbols to pay anywhere, as long as there is at least one in at least three consecutive reels from left to right. Multi-way games may be configured to allow players to bet by-reel: for example, on a game with a 3x5 pattern (often referred to as a 243-way game), playing one reel allows all three symbols in the first reel to potentially pay, but only the center row pays on the remaining reels (often designated by darkening the unused portions of the reels). Other multi-way games use a 4x5 or 5x5 pattern, where there are up to five symbols in each reel, allowing for up to 1,024 and 3,125 ways to win respectively. The Australian manufacturer Aristocrat brands games featuring this system as "Reel Power", "Xtra Reel Power" and "Super Reel Power" respectively. A variation involves patterns where symbols are adjacent to one another. Most of these games have a hexagonal reel formation, and much like multi-way games, any patterns not played are darkened out of use.

Denominations can range from 1 cent ("penny slots") all the way up to $100.00 or more per credit. The latter are typically known as "high limit" machines, and machines configured to allow for such wagers are often located in dedicated areas (which may have a separate team of attendants to cater to the needs of those who play there). The machine automatically calculates the number of credits the player receives in exchange for the cash inserted. Newer machines often allow players to choose from a selection of denominations on a splash screen or menu.

== Terminology ==
Bonus
A special feature of the particular game theme, which is activated when certain symbols appear in a winning combination. Bonuses and the number of bonus features vary depending upon the game. Some bonus rounds are a special session of free spins (the number of which is often based on the winning combination that triggers the bonus), often with a different or modified set of winning combinations as the main game and/or other multipliers or increased frequencies of symbols, or a "hold and re-spin" mechanic in which specific symbols (usually marked with values of credits or other prizes) are collected and locked in place over a finite number of spins. In other bonus rounds, the player is presented with several items on a screen from which to choose. As the player chooses items, a number of credits is revealed and awarded. Some bonuses use a mechanical device, such as a spinning wheel, that works in conjunction with the bonus to display the amount won.
Candle
A light on top of the slot machine. It flashes to alert the operator that change is needed, hand pay is requested, a potential problem with the machine or the progressive jackpot has been won. It can be lit by the player by pressing the "service" or "help" button.
Carousel
A grouping of slot machines, usually in a circle or oval formation.
Coin hopper
A container where the coins that are immediately available for payouts are held. The hopper is a mechanical device that rotates coins into the coin tray when a player collects credits/coins (by pressing a "Cash Out" button). When a certain preset coin capacity is reached, a coin diverter automatically redirects, or "drops", excess coins into a "drop bucket" or "drop box". (Unused coin hoppers can still be found even on games that exclusively employ Ticket-In, Ticket-Out technology, as a vestige.)
Credit meter
A display of the amount of money or number of credits on the machine. On mechanical slot machines, this is usually a seven-segment display, but video slot machines typically use stylized text that suits the game's theme and user interface.
Drop bucket (or drop box)
A container located in a slot machine's base where excess coins are diverted from the hopper. Typically, a drop bucket is used for low-denomination slot machines and a drop box is used for high-denomination slot machines. A drop box contains a hinged lid with one or more locks whereas a drop bucket does not contain a lid. The contents of drop buckets and drop boxes are collected and counted by the casino on a scheduled basis.
EGM
Electronic Gaming Machine.
Free spin
Free spins are a common form of bonus, where a series of spins are automatically played at no charge at the player's current wager. Free spins are usually triggered via a scatter of at least three designated symbols (with the number of spins dependent on the number of symbols that land). Some games allow the free spins bonus to "retrigger", which adds additional spins on top of those already awarded. There is no theoretical limit to the number of free spins obtainable. Some games may have other features that can also trigger over the course of free spins.
Hand pay
A payout made by an attendant or at an exchange point ("cage"), rather than by the slot machine itself. A hand pay occurs when the amount of the payout exceeds the maximum amount that was preset by the slot machine's operator. Usually, the maximum amount is set at the level where the operator must begin to deduct taxes. A hand pay could also be necessary as a result of a short pay.
Hopper fill slip
A document used to record the replenishment of the coin in the coin hopper after it becomes depleted as a result of making payouts to players. The slip indicates the amount of coin placed into the hoppers, as well as the signatures of the employees involved in the transaction, the slot machine number and the location and the date.
MEAL book
The Machine entry access log or Machine entry authorization log, depending on the jurisdiction or venue, is a log of the employee's entries into the machine.
Low-level (or slant-top)
These slot machines include a stool so the player may sit down. Stand-up or upright slot machines are played while standing.
Optimal play
A payback percentage based on a gambler using the optimal strategy in a skill-based slot machine game.
Payline
A line that crosses through one symbol on each reel, along which a winning combination is evaluated. Classic spinning reel machines usually have up to nine paylines, while video slot machines may have as many as one hundred. Paylines could be of various shapes (horizontal, vertical, oblique, triangular, zigzag, etc.)
Persistent state
Passive features on some slot machines, some of which able to trigger bonus payouts or other special features if certain conditions are met over time by players on that machine.
Roll-up
The process of dramatizing a win by playing sounds while the meters count up to the amount that has been won.
Scatter
A pay combination based on occurrences of a designated symbol landing anywhere on the reels, rather than falling in sequence on the same payline. A scatter pay usually requires a minimum of three symbols to land, and the machine may offer increased prizes or jackpots depending on the number that land. Scatters are frequently used to trigger bonus games, such as free spins (with the number of spins multiplying based on the number of scatter symbols that land). The scatter symbol usually cannot be matched using wilds, and some games may require the scatter symbols to appear on consecutive reels in order to pay. On some multiway games, scatter symbols still pay in unused areas.
Short pay
A partial payout made by a slot machine, which is less than the amount due to the player. This occurs if the coin hopper has been depleted as a result of making earlier payouts to players. The remaining amount due to the player is either paid as a hand pay or an attendant will come and refill the machine.
Theoretical hold worksheet
A document provided by the manufacturer for every slot machine that indicates the theoretical percentage the machine should hold based on the amount paid in. The worksheet also indicates the reel strip settings, number of coins that may be played, the payout schedule, the number of reels and other information descriptive of the particular type of slot machine.

Display screen of a slot machine in tilt mode

Tilt
A term derived from electromechanical slot machines' "tilt switches", which would make or break a circuit when they were tilted or otherwise tampered with that triggered an alarm. While modern machines no longer have tilt switches, any kind of technical fault (door switch in the wrong state, reel motor failure, out of paper, etc.) is still called a "tilt".
Volatility (or variance)
The measure of risk associated with playing a slot machine. A low-volatility slot machine has regular but smaller wins, while a high-variance slot machine has fewer but bigger wins.
Weight count
US term referring to the total value of coins or tokens removed from a slot machine's drop bucket or drop box for counting by the casino's hard count team through the use of a weigh scale.
Wild symbols
These substitute for most other symbols in the game (similarly to a joker card), usually excluding scatter and jackpot symbols (or offering a lower prize on non-natural combinations that include wilds). How jokers behave are dependent on the specific game and whether the player is in a bonus or free games mode. Sometimes wild symbols may only appear on certain reels, or have a chance to "stack" across the entire reel.

== Pay table ==
Each machine has a table that lists the number of credits the player will receive if the symbols listed on the pay table line up on the pay line of the machine. Some symbols are wild and can represent many, or all, of the other symbols to complete a winning line. Especially on older machines, the pay table is listed on the face of the machine, usually above and below the area containing the wheels. On video slot machines, they are usually contained within a help menu, along with information on other features.

== Technology ==
=== Reels ===
Historically, all slot machines used revolving mechanical reels to display and determine results. Although the original slot machine used five reels, simpler, and therefore more reliable, three reel machines quickly became the standard.

A problem with three reel machines is that the number of combinations is only cubic – the original slot machine with three physical reels and 10 symbols on each reel had only 10^{3} = 1,000 possible combinations. This limited the manufacturer's ability to offer large jackpots since even the rarest event had a likelihood of 0.1%. The maximum theoretical payout, assuming 100% return to player would be 1000 times the bet, but that would leave no room for other pays, making the machine very high risk, and also quite boring.

Although the number of symbols eventually increased to about 22, allowing 10,648 combinations, this still limited jackpot sizes as well as the number of possible outcomes.

In the 1980s, however, slot machine manufacturers incorporated electronics into their products and programmed them to weight particular symbols. Thus the odds of losing symbols appearing on the payline became disproportionate to their actual frequency on the physical reel. A symbol would only appear once on the reel displayed to the player, but could, in fact, occupy several stops on the multiple reel.

In 1984, Norwegian mathematician Inge Telnaes received a patent for a device titled, "Electronic Gaming Device Utilizing a Random Number Generator for Selecting the Reel Stop Positions" (US Patent 4448419), which states: "It is important to make a machine that is perceived to present greater chances of payoff than it actually has within the legal limitations that games of chance must operate." The patent was later bought by International Game Technology and has since expired.

A virtual reel that has 256 virtual stops per reel would allow up to 256^{3} = 16,777,216 final positions. The manufacturer could choose to offer a $1 million jackpot on a $1 bet, confident that it will only happen, over the long term, once every 16.8 million plays.

=== Computerization ===
With microprocessors now ubiquitous, the computers inside modern slot machines allow manufacturers to assign a different probability to every symbol on every reel. To the player, it might appear that a winning symbol was "so close", whereas in fact the probability is much lower.

In the 1980s in the U.K., machines embodying microprocessors became common. These used a number of features to ensure the payout was controlled within the limits of the gambling legislation. As a coin was inserted into the machine, it could go either directly into the cashbox for the benefit of the owner or into a channel that formed the payout reservoir, with the microprocessor monitoring the number of coins in this channel. The drums themselves were driven by stepper motors, controlled by the processor and with proximity sensors monitoring the position of the drums. A "look-up table" within the software allows the processor to know what symbols were being displayed on the drums to the gambler. This allowed the system to control the level of payout by stopping the drums at positions it had determined. If the payout channel had filled up, the payout became more generous; if nearly empty, the payout became less so (thus giving good control of the odds).

=== Video slot machines ===
Video slot machines do not use mechanical reels, but use graphical reels on a computerized display. As there are no mechanical constraints on the design of video slot machines, games often use at least five reels, and may also use non-standard layouts. This greatly expands the number of possibilities: a machine can have 50 or more symbols on a reel, giving odds as high as 300 million to 1 against – enough for even the largest jackpot. As there are so many combinations possible with five reels, manufacturers do not need to weight the payout symbols (although some may still do so). Instead, higher paying symbols will typically appear only once or twice on each reel, while more common symbols earning a more frequent payout will appear many times. Video slot machines usually make more extensive use of multimedia, and can feature more elaborate minigames as bonuses. Modern cabinets typically use flat-panel displays, but cabinets using larger curved screens (which can provide a more immersive experience for the player) are not uncommon.

Video slot machines typically encourage the player to play multiple "lines": rather than simply taking the middle of the three symbols displayed on each reel, a line could go from top left to the bottom right or any other pattern specified by the manufacturer. As each symbol is equally likely, there is no difficulty for the manufacturer in allowing the player to take as many of the possible lines on offer as desired – the long-term return to the player will be the same. The difference for the player is that the more lines they play, the more likely they are to get paid on a given spin (because they are betting more).

To avoid seeming as if the player's money is simply ebbing away (whereas a payout of 100 credits on a single-line machine would be 100 bets and the player would feel they had made a substantial win, on a 20-line machine, it would only be five bets and not seem as significant), manufacturers commonly offer bonus games, which can return many times their bet. The player is encouraged to keep playing to reach the bonus: even if they are losing, the bonus game could allow them to win back their losses.

=== Payout percentage ===
Slot machines are typically programmed to pay out as winnings 0% to 99% of the money that is wagered by players. This is known as the "theoretical payout percentage" or RTP, "return to player". The minimum theoretical payout percentage varies among jurisdictions and is typically established by law or regulation. For example, the minimum payout in Nevada is 75%, in New Jersey 83%, and in Mississippi 80%. The winning patterns on slot machines – the amounts they pay and the frequencies of those payouts – are carefully selected to yield a certain fraction of the money paid to the "house" (the operator of the slot machine) while returning the rest to the players during play. Suppose that a certain slot machine costs $1 per spin and has a return to player (RTP) of 95%. It can be calculated that, over a sufficiently long period such as 1,000,000 spins, the machine will return an average of $950,000 to its players, who have inserted $1,000,000 during that time. In this (simplified) example, the slot machine is said to pay out 95%. The operator keeps the remaining $50,000. Within some EGM development organizations this concept is referred to simply as "par". "Par" also manifests itself to gamblers as promotional techniques: "Our 'Loose Slots' have a 93% payback! Play now!"

A slot machine's theoretical payout percentage is set at the factory when the software is written. Changing the payout percentage after a slot machine has been placed on the gaming floor requires a physical swap of the software or firmware, which is usually stored on an EPROM but may be loaded onto non-volatile random access memory (NVRAM) or even stored on CD-ROM or DVD, depending on the capabilities of the machine and the applicable regulations. Based on current technology, this is a time-consuming process and as such is done infrequently. In certain jurisdictions, such as New Jersey, the EPROM has a tamper-evident seal and can only be changed in the presence of Gaming Control Board officials. Other jurisdictions, including Nevada, randomly audit slot machines to ensure that they contain only approved software.

Historically, many casinos, both online and offline, have been unwilling to publish individual game RTP figures, making it impossible for the player to know whether they are playing a "loose" or a "tight" game. Since the turn of the century, some information regarding these figures has started to come into the public domain either through various casinos releasing them—primarily this applies to online casinos—or through studies by independent gambling authorities.

The return to player is not the only statistic that is of interest. The probabilities of every payout on the pay table is also critical. For example, consider a hypothetical slot machine with a dozen different values on the pay table. However, the probabilities of getting all the payouts are zero except the largest one. If the payout is 4,000 times the input amount, and it happens every 4,000 times on average, the return to player is exactly 100%, but the game would be dull to play. Also, most people would not win anything, and having entries on the paytable that have a return of zero would be deceptive. As these individual probabilities are closely guarded secrets, it is possible that the advertised machines with high return to player simply increase the probabilities of these jackpots. The casino could legally place machines of a similar style payout and advertise that some machines have 100% return to player. The added advantage is that these large jackpots increase the excitement of the other players.

The table of probabilities for a specific machine is called the Probability and Accounting Report or PAR sheet, also PARS commonly understood as Paytable and Reel Strips. Mathematician Michael Shackleford revealed the PARS for one commercial slot machine, an original International Gaming Technology Red White and Blue machine. This game, in its original form, is obsolete, so these specific probabilities do not apply. He only published the odds after a fan of his sent him some information provided on a slot machine that was posted on a machine in the Netherlands. The psychology of the machine design is quickly revealed. There are 13 possible payouts ranging from 1:1 to 2,400:1. The 1:1 payout comes every 8 plays. The 5:1 payout comes every 33 plays, whereas the 2:1 payout comes every 600 plays. Most players assume the likelihood increases proportionate to the payout. The one mid-size payout that is designed to give the player a thrill is the 80:1 payout. It is programmed to occur an average of once every 219 plays. The 80:1 payout is high enough to create excitement, but not high enough that it makes it likely that the player will take their winnings and abandon the game. More than likely the player began the game with at least 80 times his bet (for instance there are 80 quarters in $20). In contrast the 150:1 payout occurs only on average of once every 6,241 plays. The highest payout of 2,400:1 occurs only on average of once every 64^{3} = 262,144 plays since the machine has 64 virtual stops. The player who continues to feed the machine is likely to have several mid-size payouts, but unlikely to have a large payout. He quits after he is bored or has exhausted his bankroll.

Despite their confidentiality, occasionally a PAR sheet is posted on a website. They have limited value to the player, because usually a machine will have 8 to 12 different possible programs with varying payouts. In addition, slight variations of each machine (e.g., with double jackpots or five times play) are always being developed. The casino operator can choose which EPROM chip to install in any particular machine to select the payout desired. The result is that there is not really such a thing as a high payback type of machine, since every machine potentially has multiple settings. From October 2001 to February 2002, columnist Michael Shackleford obtained PAR sheets for five different nickel machines; four IGT games Austin Powers, Fortune Cookie, Leopard Spots and Wheel of Fortune and one game manufactured by WMS; Reel 'em In. Without revealing the proprietary information, he developed a program that would allow him to determine with usually less than a dozen plays on each machine which EPROM chip was installed. Then he did a survey of over 400 machines in 70 different casinos in Las Vegas. He averaged the data, and assigned an average payback percentage to the machines in each casino. The resultant list was widely publicized for marketing purposes (especially by the Palms casino which had the top ranking).

One reason that the slot machine is so profitable to a casino is that the player must play the high house edge and high payout wagers along with the low house edge and low payout wagers. In a more traditional wagering game like craps, the player knows that certain wagers have almost a 50/50 chance of winning or losing, but they only pay a limited multiple of the original bet (usually no higher than three times). Other bets have a higher house edge, but the player is rewarded with a bigger win (up to thirty times in craps). The player can choose what kind of wager he wants to make. A slot machine does not afford such an opportunity. Theoretically, the operator could make these probabilities available, or allow the player to choose which one so that the player is free to make a choice. However, no operator has ever enacted this strategy. Different machines have different maximum payouts, but without knowing the odds of getting the jackpot, there is no rational way to differentiate.

In many markets where central monitoring and control systems are used to link machines for auditing and security purposes, usually in wide area networks of multiple venues and thousands of machines, player return must usually be changed from a central computer rather than at each machine. A range of percentages is set in the game software and selected remotely.

In 2006, the Nevada Gaming Commission began working with Las Vegas casinos on technology that would allow the casino's management to change the game, the odds, and the payouts remotely. The change cannot be done instantaneously, but only after the selected machine has been idle for at least four minutes. After the change is made, the machine must be locked to new players for four minutes and display an on-screen message informing potential players that a change is being made.

=== Linked machines ===
Some varieties of slot machines can be linked together in a setup sometimes known as a "community" game. The most basic form of this setup involves progressive jackpots that are shared between the bank of machines, but may include multiplayer bonuses and other features.

In some cases multiple machines are linked across multiple casinos. In these cases, the machines may be owned by the manufacturer, who is responsible for paying the jackpot. The casinos lease the machines rather than owning them outright. Casinos in New Jersey, Nevada, Louisiana, Arkansas, and South Dakota now offer multi-state progressive jackpots, which now offer bigger jackpot pools.

=== Fraud ===
Mechanical slot machines and their coin acceptors were sometimes susceptible to cheating devices and other scams. One historical example involved spinning a coin with a short length of plastic wire. The weight and size of the coin would be accepted by the machine and credits would be granted. However, the spin created by the plastic wire would cause the coin to exit through the reject chute into the payout tray. This particular scam has become obsolete due to improvements in newer slot machines. Another obsolete method of defeating slot machines was to use a light source to confuse the optical sensor used to count coins during payout.

Modern slot machines are controlled by EPROM computer chips and, in large casinos, coin acceptors have become obsolete in favor of bill acceptors. These machines and their bill acceptors are designed with advanced anti-cheating and anti-counterfeiting measures and are difficult to defraud. Early computerized slot machines were sometimes defrauded through the use of cheating devices, such as the "slider", "monkey paw", "lightwand" and "the tongue". Many of these old cheating devices were made by the late Tommy Glenn Carmichael, a slot machine fraudster who reportedly stole over $5 million. In the modern day, computerized slot machines are fully deterministic and thus outcomes can be sometimes successfully predicted.

=== Skill stops ===
Skill stop buttons predated the Bally electromechanical slot machines of the 1960s and 1970s. They appeared on mechanical slot machines manufactured by Mills Novelty Co. as early as the mid 1920s. These machines had modified reel-stop arms, which allowed them to be released from the timing bar, earlier than in a normal play, simply by pressing the buttons on the front of the machine, located between each reel.

"Skill stop" buttons were added to some slot machines by Zacharias Anthony in the early 1970s. These enabled the player to stop each reel, allowing a degree of "skill" so as to satisfy the New Jersey gaming laws of the day which required that players were able to control the game in some way. The original conversion was applied to approximately 50 late-model Bally slot machines. Because the typical machine stopped the reels automatically in less than 10 seconds, weights were added to the mechanical timers to prolong the automatic stopping of the reels. By the time the New Jersey Alcoholic Beverages Commission (ABC) had approved the conversion for use in New Jersey arcades, the word was out and every other distributor began adding skill stops. The machines were a huge hit on the Jersey Shore and the remaining unconverted Bally machines were destroyed as they had become instantly obsolete.

== Legislation ==
=== United States ===
In the United States, the public and private availability of slot machines is highly regulated by state governments. Many states have established gaming control boards to regulate the possession and use of slot machines and other forms of gaming.

Nevada is the only state that has no significant restrictions against slot machines both for public and private use. In New Jersey, slot machines are only allowed in hotel casinos operated in Atlantic City. Several states (Indiana, Louisiana and Missouri) allow slot machines (as well as any casino-style gambling) only on licensed riverboats or permanently anchored barges. Since Hurricane Katrina, Mississippi has removed the requirement that casinos on the Gulf Coast operate on barges and now allows them on land along the shoreline. Delaware allows slot machines at three horse tracks; they are regulated by the state lottery commission. In Wisconsin, bars and taverns are allowed to have up to five machines. These machines usually allow a player to either take a payout, or gamble it on a double-or-nothing "side game".

The territory of Puerto Rico places significant restrictions on slot machine ownership, but the law is widely flouted and slot machines are common in bars and coffeeshops.

In regards to tribal casinos located on Native American reservations, slot machines played against the house and operating independently from a centralized computer system are classified as "Class III" gaming by the Indian Gaming Regulatory Act (IGRA), and sometimes promoted as "Vegas-style" slot machines. In order to offer Class III gaming, tribes must enter into a compact (agreement) with the state that is approved by the Department of the Interior, which may contain restrictions on the types and quantity of such games. As a workaround, some casinos may operate slot machines as "Class II" games—a category that includes games where players play exclusively against at least one other opponent and not the house, such as bingo or any related games (such as pull-tabs). In these cases, the reels are an entertainment display with a pre-determined outcome based on a centralized game played against other players. Under the IGRA, Class II games are regulated by individual tribes and the National Indian Gaming Commission, and do not require any additional approval if the state already permits tribal gaming.

Historical horse racing (HHR) terminals operate within a similar loophole, with the machines using slots as an entertainment display for outcomes paid using the parimutuel betting system, based on results of randomly-selected, previously-held horse races (with the player able to view anonymized details about the race and its competitors to adjust their wager before playing a credit, or otherwise use an auto-bet system). Early HHR machines resembled traditional self-serve terminals, but modern machines adopted slot machine-like gameplay with the race itself downplayed from the user interface, to the point that some opponents of HHR have considered them to be imperceptible from slots from a legal standpoint (with the state of Oregon ruling in 2022 that the deliberate abstraction of betting functionality away from the player gave them "[no] meaningful opportunity to exercise skill" in their wagering, and thus made them no different to a lottery).

==== Private ownership ====
Alaska, Arizona, Arkansas, Kentucky, Maine, Minnesota, Nevada, Ohio, Rhode Island, Texas, Utah, Virginia, and West Virginia place no restrictions on private ownership of slot machines. Conversely, in Connecticut, Hawaii, Nebraska, South Carolina, and Tennessee, private ownership of any slot machine is completely prohibited. The remaining states allow slot machines of a certain age (typically 25–30 years) or slot machines manufactured before a specific date.

=== Canada ===
The Government of Canada has minimal involvement in gambling beyond the Canadian Criminal Code. In essence, the term "lottery scheme" used in the code means slot machines, bingo and table games normally associated with a casino. These fall under the jurisdiction of the province or territory without reference to the federal government; in practice, all Canadian provinces operate gaming boards that oversee lotteries, casinos and video lottery terminals under their jurisdiction.

OLG piloted a classification system for slot machines at the Grand River Raceway developed by University of Waterloo professor Kevin Harrigan, as part of its PlaySmart initiative for responsible gambling. Inspired by nutrition labels on foods, they displayed metrics such as volatility and frequency of payouts. OLG has also deployed electronic gaming machines with pre-determined outcomes based on a bingo or pull-tab game, initially branded as "TapTix", which visually resemble slot machines.

=== Australia ===
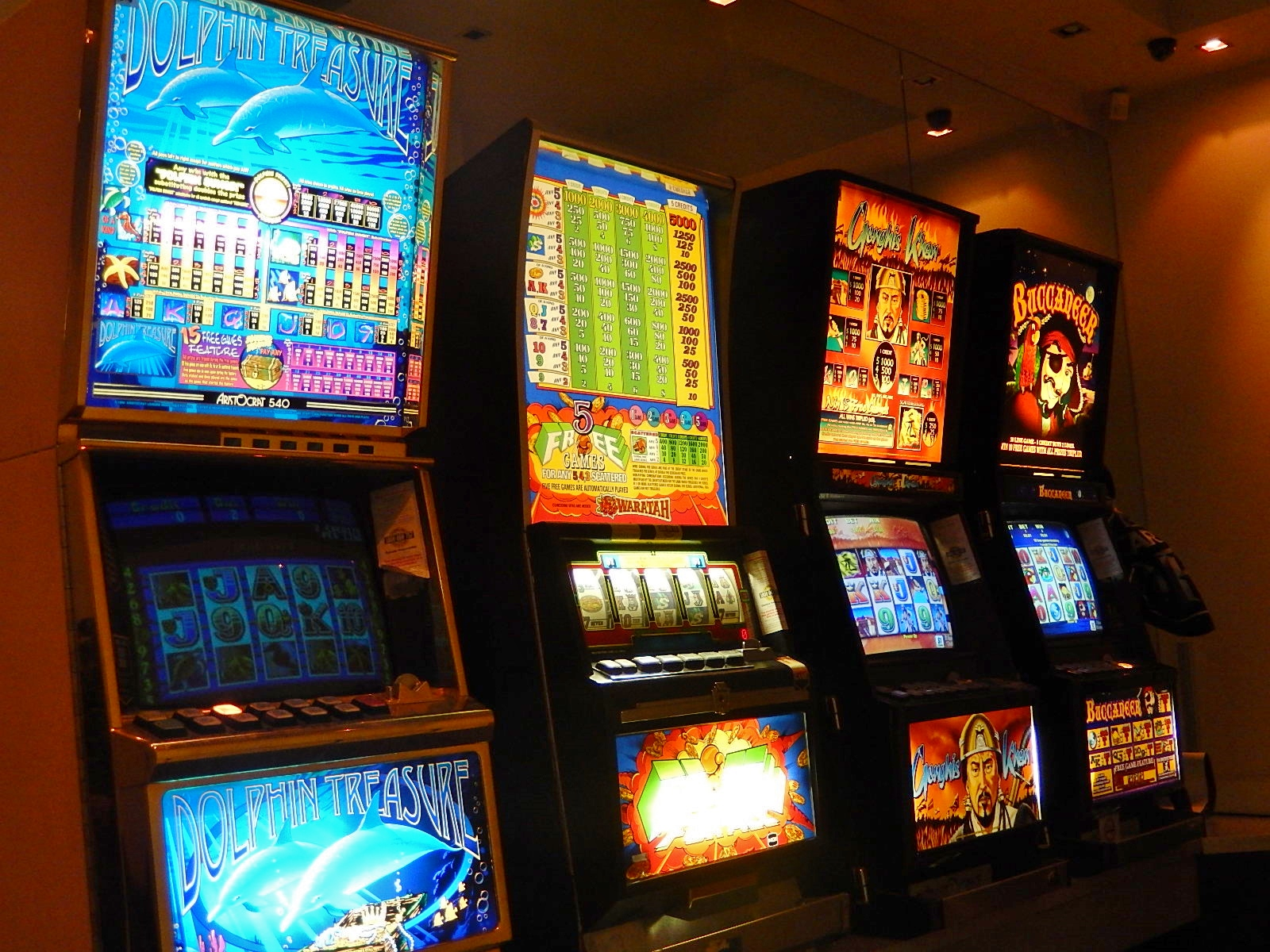
A set of pokie machines in Australia

In Australia "Poker Machines" or "pokies" are officially termed "gaming machines". In Australia, gaming machines are a matter for state governments, so laws vary between states. Gaming machines are found in casinos (approximately one in each major city), pubs and clubs in some states (usually sports, social, or RSL clubs). The first Australian state to legalize this style of gambling was New South Wales, when in 1956 they were made legal in all registered clubs in the state. There are suggestions that the proliferation of poker machines has led to increased levels of problem gambling; however, the precise nature of this link is still open to research.

In 1999 the Australian Productivity Commission reported that nearly half of Australia's gaming machines were in New South Wales. At the time, 21% of all the gambling machines in the world were operating in Australia and, on a per capita basis, Australia had roughly five times as many gaming machines as the United States. Australia ranks 8th in total number of gaming machines after Japan, US, Italy, UK, Spain and Germany. This primarily is because gaming machines have been legal in the state of New South Wales since 1956; over time, the number of machines has grown to 97,103 (at December 2010, including the Australian Capital Territory). By way of comparison, the US state of Nevada, which legalised gaming including slots several decades before NSW, had 190,135 slots operating.

Revenue from gaming machines in pubs and clubs accounts for more than half of the $4 billion in gambling revenue collected by state governments in fiscal year 2002–03.

In Queensland, gaming machines in pubs and clubs must provide a return rate of 85%, while machines located in casinos must provide a return rate of 92%. Most other states have similar provisions. In Victoria, gaming machines must provide a minimum return rate of at least 85% (including jackpot contribution), are prohibited from accepting bills greater than $50 in denomination, and each wager must be manually initiated by the player (thus prohibiting "autoplay" mechanisms).

Western Australia has the most restrictive regulations on electronic gaming machines (EGMs) in general. They may only be operated at the Crown Perth casino resort, which is the only casino in Western Australia, and have a return rate of 90%. Many EGMs operate games that are nearly identical to slot machines, but with modifications to comply with state law: EGMs are prohibited from using spinning reels, and must not use symbols associated with poker machines used elsewhere. Each wager must take at least three seconds to play, and each wager must be initiated by the user.

This policy has an extensive political history, reaffirmed by the 1974 Royal Commission into Gambling:

Poker machine playing is a mindless, repetitive and insidious form of gambling which has many undesirable features. It requires no thought, no skill or social contact. The odds are never about winning. Watching people playing the machines over long periods of time, the impressionistic evidence at least is that they are addictive to many people. Historically poker machines have been banned from Western Australia and we consider that, in the public interest, they should stay banned.

Despite the state having praised its restrictions for keeping gaming machines from being widely available to the public as in other states, the machines have faced criticism for being almost indistinguishable to a normal slot machine, and thus having the same addictive qualities. In March 2022, a royal commission found Crown Gaming to be unfit to hold a gaming license in WA, citing issues surrounding money laundering, failing to minimise harms from problem gambling, and the regulatory framework of the Gaming and Wagering Commission being considered outdated. To implement the recommendations of the Commission, EGMs were limited to maximum bets of $10 beginning in July 2023, while also requiring the implementation of weekly limits on play and losses, and the implementation of cashless machines requiring pre-loaded player cards to function.

Nick Xenophon was elected on an independent No Pokies ticket in the South Australian Legislative Council at the 1997 South Australian state election on 2.9 percent, re-elected at the 2006 election on 20.5 percent, and elected to the Australian Senate at the 2007 federal election on 14.8 percent. Independent candidate Andrew Wilkie, an anti-pokies campaigner, was elected to the Australian House of Representatives seat of Denison at the 2010 federal election. Wilkie was one of four crossbenchers who supported the Gillard Labor government following the hung parliament result. Wilkie immediately began forging ties with Xenophon as soon as it was apparent that he was elected. In exchange for Wilkie's support, the Labor government are attempting to implement precommitment technology for high-bet/high-intensity poker machines, against opposition from the Tony Abbott Coalition and Clubs Australia.

During the COVID-19 pandemic of 2020, every establishment in the country that facilitated poker machines was shut down, in an attempt to curb the spread of the virus, bringing Australia's usage of poker machines effectively to zero.

=== Russia ===
In Russia, "slot clubs" appeared quite late, only in 1992. Before 1992, slot machines were only in casinos and small shops, but later slot clubs began appearing all over the country. The most popular and numerous were "Vulcan 777" and "Taj Mahal". Since 2009, when gambling establishments were banned, almost all slot clubs disappeared and are found only in a specially authorized gambling zones.

=== United Kingdom ===
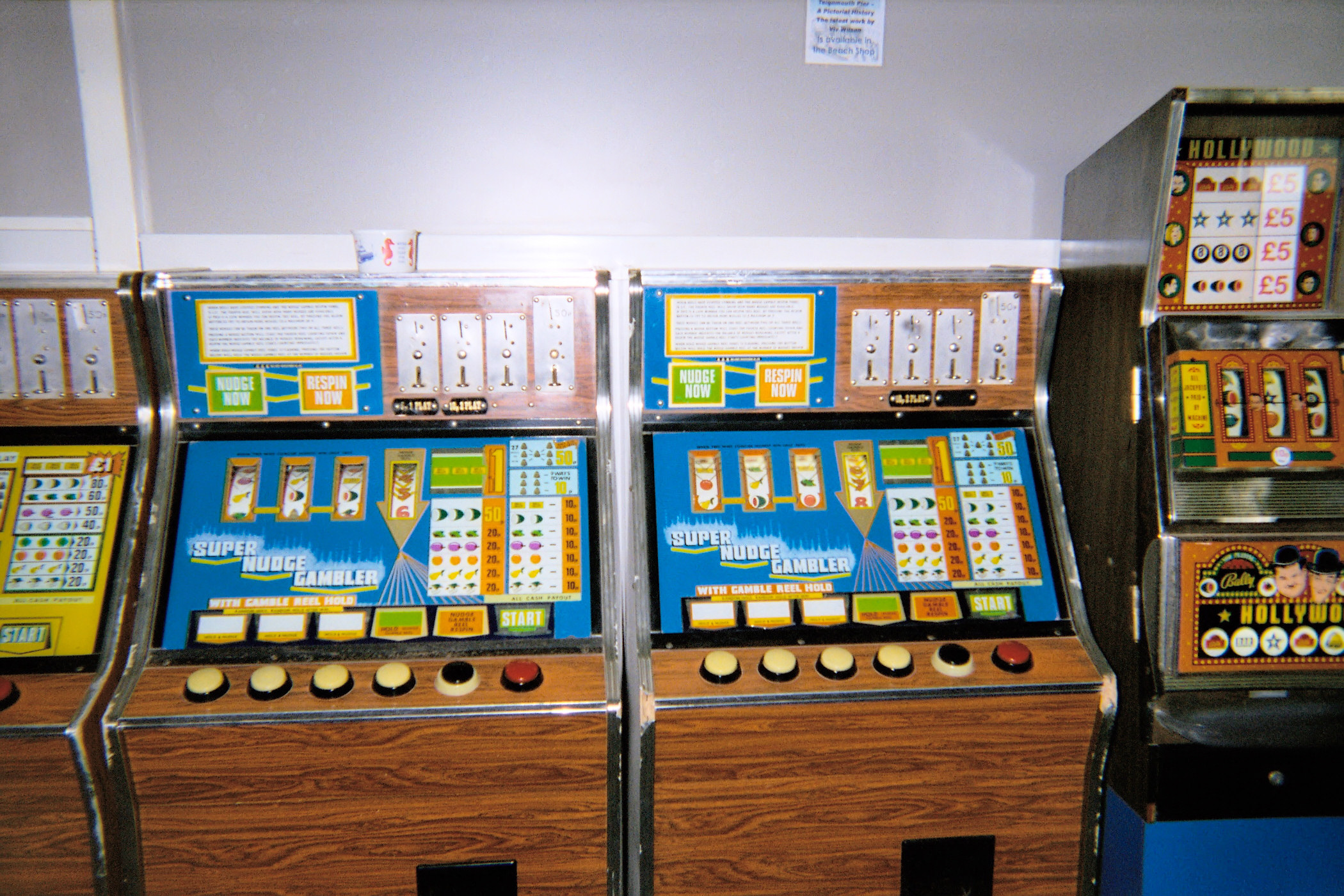
Row of old fruit machines in Teignmouth Pier, Devon

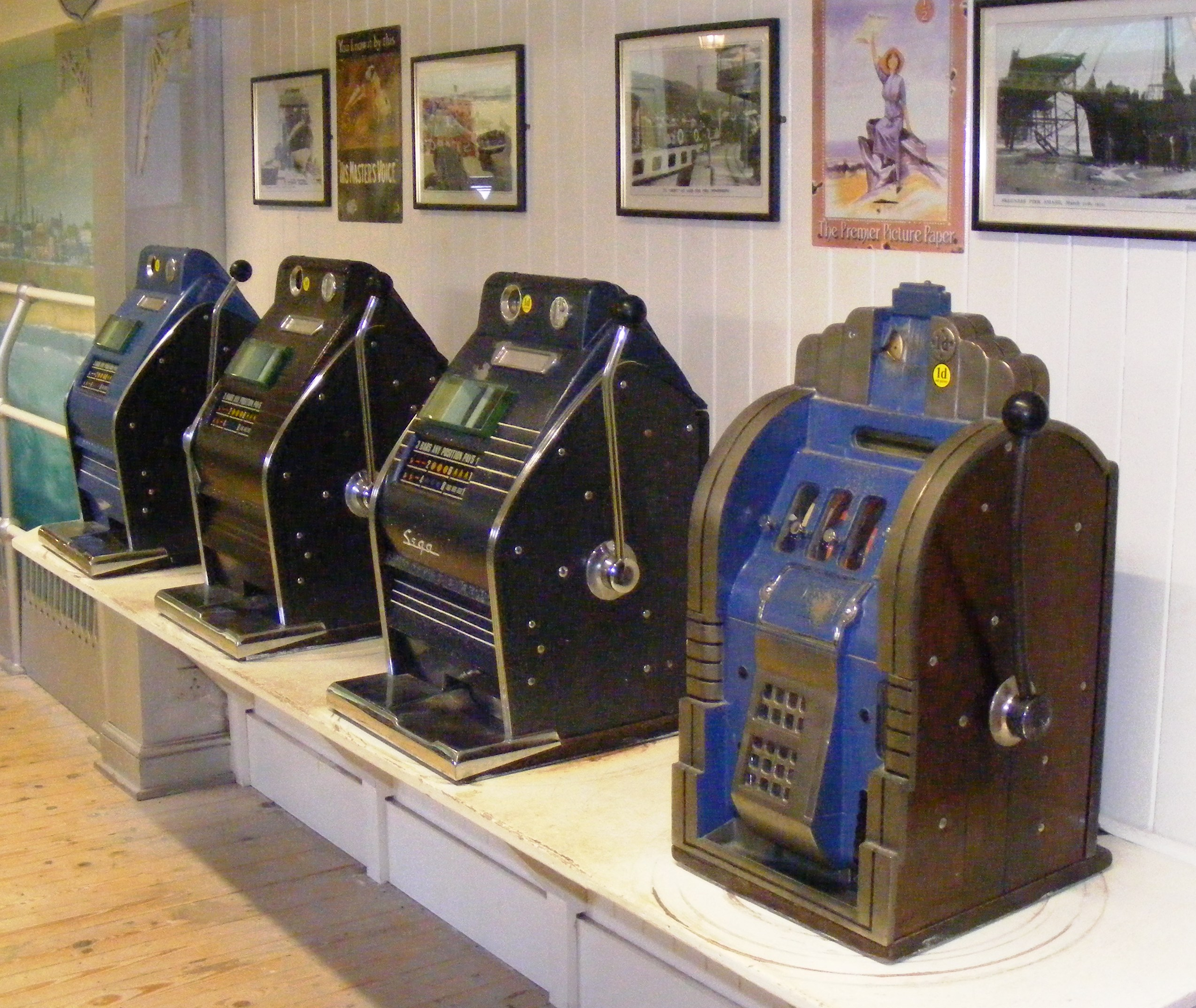
One armed bandits at Wookey Hole Caves

Slot machines are covered by the Gambling Act 2005, which superseded the Gaming Act 1968.

Slot machines in the U.K. are categorised by definitions produced by the Gambling Commission as part of the Gambling Act of 2005.

Machine category	Maximum stake (from April 2019)	Maximum prize (from April 2019)
A	Unlimited	Unlimited
B1	£5	£10,000 or if the game has a progressive jackpot that can be £20,000
B2	£2	£500
B3	£2	£500
B3A	£1	£500
B4	£2	£400
C	£1	£100 or £200 If jackpot is repeated
D (various)	10p to £8	£8 cash or £50 non-cash

Casinos built under the provisions of the 1968 Act are allowed to house either up to twenty machines of categories B–D or any number of C–D machines. As defined by the 2005 Act, large casinos can have a maximum of one hundred and fifty machines in any combination of categories B–D (subject to a machine-to-table ratio of 5:1); small casinos can have a maximum of eighty machines in any combination of categories B–D (subject to a machine-to-table ratio of 2:1).

==== Category A ====
Category A games were defined in preparation for the planned "Super Casinos". Despite a lengthy bidding process with Manchester being chosen as the single planned location, the development was cancelled soon after Gordon Brown became Prime Minister of the United Kingdom. As a result, there are no lawful Category A games in the U.K.

==== Category B ====
Category B games are divided into subcategories. The differences between B1, B3 and B4 games are mainly the stake and prizes as defined in the above table. Category B2 games – Fixed odds betting terminals (FOBTs) – have quite different stake and prize rules: FOBTs are mainly found in licensed betting shops, or bookmakers, usually in the form of electronic roulette.

The games are based on a random number generator; thus each game's probability of getting the jackpot is independent of any other game: probabilities are all equal. If a pseudorandom number generator is used instead of a truly random one, probabilities are not independent since each number is determined at least in part by the one generated before it.

==== Category C ====
Category C games are often referred to as fruit machines, one-armed bandits and AWP (amusement with prize). Fruit machines are commonly found in pubs, clubs, and arcades. Machines commonly have three but can be found with four or five reels, each with 16–24 symbols printed around them. The reels are spun each play, from which the appearance of particular combinations of symbols result in payment of their associated winnings by the machine (or alternatively initiation of a subgame). These games often have many extra features, trails and subgames with opportunities to win money; usually more than can be won from just the payouts on the reel combinations.

Fruit machines in the U.K. almost universally have the following features, generally selected at random using a pseudorandom number generator:

- A player (known in the industry as a punter) may be given the opportunity to hold one or more reels before spinning, meaning they will not be spun but instead retain their displayed symbols yet otherwise count normally for that play. This can sometimes increase the chance of winning, especially if two or more reels are held.
- A player may also be given a number of nudges following a spin (or, in some machines, as a result in a subgame). A nudge is a step rotation of a reel chosen by the player (the machine may not allow all reels to be nudged for a particular play).
- Cheats can also be made available on the internet or through emailed newsletters to subscribers. These cheats give the player the impression of an advantage, whereas in reality the payout percentage remains exactly the same. The most widely used cheat is known as hold after a nudge and increases the chance that the player will win following an unsuccessful nudge. Machines from the early 1990s did not advertise the concept of hold after a nudge when this feature was first introduced, it became so well known amongst players and widespread amongst new machine releases that it is now well-advertised on the machine during play. This is characterized by messages on the display such as DON'T HOLD ANY or LET 'EM SPIN and is a designed feature of the machine, not a cheat at all. Holding the same pair three times on three consecutive spins also gives a guaranteed win on most machines that offer holds.

It is known for machines to pay out multiple jackpots, one after the other (this is known as a "repeat") but each jackpot requires a new game to be played so as not to violate the law about the maximum payout on a single play. Typically this involves the player only pressing the Start button at the "repeat" prompt, for which a single credit is taken, regardless of whether this causes the reels to spin or not. Machines are also known to intentionally set aside money, which is later awarded in a series of wins, known as a "streak". The minimum payout percentage is 70%, with pubs often setting the payout at around 78%.

Slot machines in Japan, 2024

=== Japan ===
Japanese slot machines, known as pachislot (Japanese: パチスロ, Hepburn: pachisuro) from the words "pachinko" and "slot machine", are a descendant of the traditional Japanese pachinko game. Slot machines are a fairly new phenomenon and they can be found mostly in pachinko parlors and the adult sections of amusement arcades, known as game centers.

== Jackpot disputes ==
Electronic slot machines can malfunction. When the displayed amount is smaller than the one it is supposed to be, the error usually goes unnoticed. When it happens the other way, disputes are likely. Below are some notable arguments caused by the owners of the machines saying that the displayed amounts were far larger than the ones patrons should get.

=== United States ===
Two such cases occurred in casinos in Colorado in 2010, where software errors led to indicated jackpots of $11 million and $42 million. Analysis of machine records by the state Gaming Commission revealed faults, with the true jackpot being substantially smaller. State gaming laws did not require a casino to honour payouts in that case.

=== Vietnam ===
On October 25, 2009, while a Vietnamese American man, Ly Sam, was playing a slot machine in the Palazzo Club at the Sheraton Saigon Hotel in Ho Chi Minh City, Vietnam, it displayed that he had hit a jackpot of US$55,542,296.73. The casino refused to pay, saying it was a machine error, Ly sued the casino. On January 7, 2013, the District 1 People's Court in Ho Chi Minh City decided that the casino had to pay the amount Ly claimed in full, not trusting the error report from an inspection company hired by the casino. Both sides appealed thereafter, and Ly asked for interest while the casino refused to pay him. In January, 2014, the news reported that the case had been settled out of court, and Ly had received an undisclosed sum.

== Problem gambling and slot machines ==
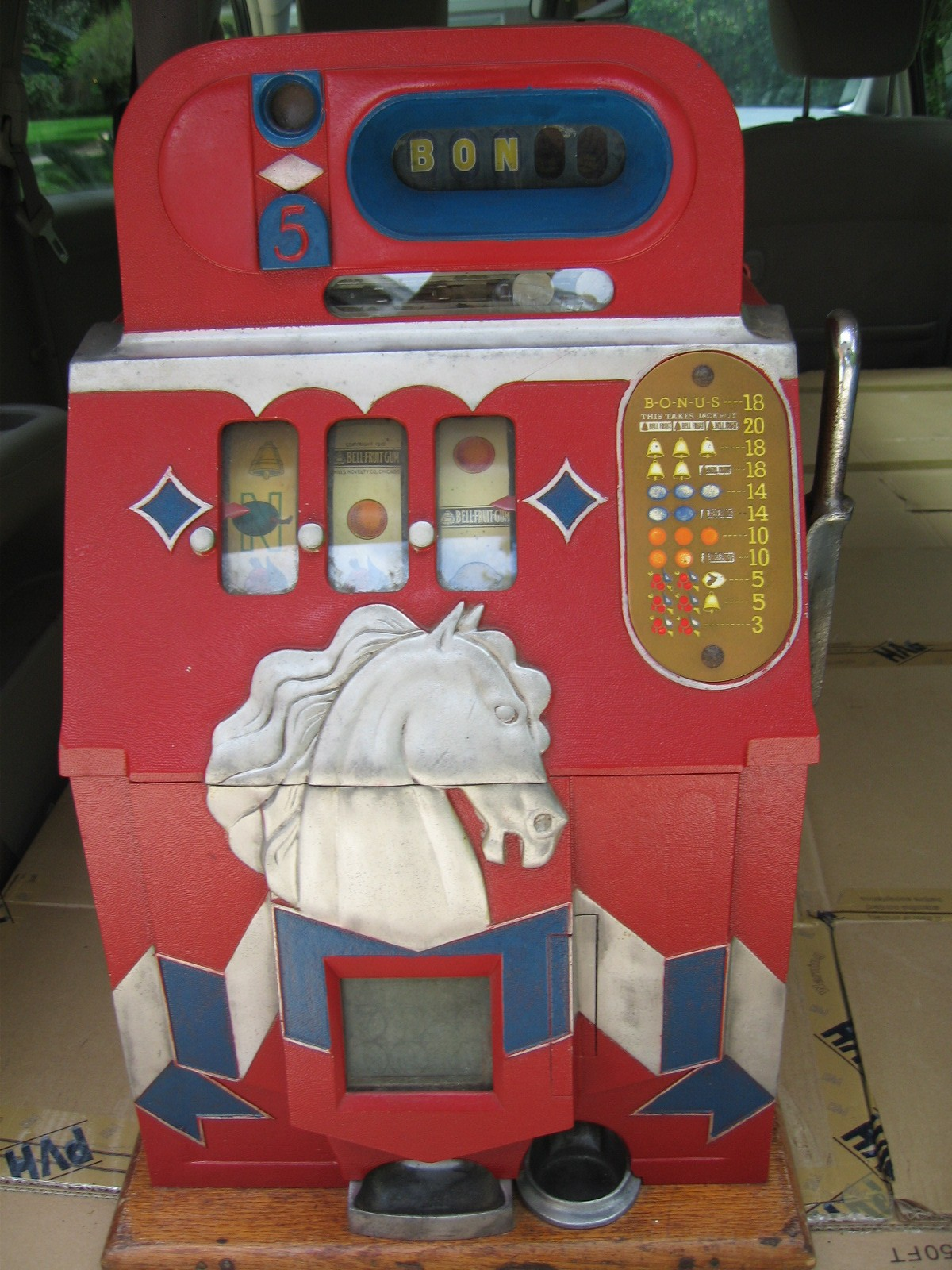
Mills Novelty Co. Horse Head Bonus antique slot machine

Natasha Dow Schüll, associate professor in New York University's Department of Media, Culture and Communication, uses the term "machine zone" to describe the state of immersion that users of slot machines experience when gambling, where they lose a sense of time, space, bodily awareness, and monetary value.

Mike Dixon, PhD, professor of psychology at the University of Waterloo, studies the relationship between slot players and machines. In one of Dixon's studies, players were observed experiencing heightened arousal from the sensory stimulus coming from the machines. They "sought to show that these 'losses disguised as wins' (LDWs) would be as arousing as wins, and more arousing than regular losses."

Psychologists Robert Breen and Marc Zimmerman found that players of video slot machines reach a debilitating level of involvement with gambling three times as rapidly as those who play traditional casino games, even if they have engaged in other forms of gambling without problems.

Eye-tracking research in local bookkeepers' offices in the UK suggested that, in slots games, the reels dominated players' visual attention, and that problem gamblers looked more frequently at amount-won messages than did those without gambling problems.

The 2011 60 Minutes report "Slot Machines: The Big Gamble" focused on the link between slot machines and gambling addiction.

== See also ==
- Casino
- European Gaming & Amusement Federation
- List of probability topics
- Multi-armed bandit
- Pachinko
- Problem gambling
- Progressive jackpot
- Quiz machine
- United States slot machine ownership regulations by state
- Video bingo
- Video lottery terminal (VLT)
- Video poker

== Bibliography ==
- Brisman, Andrew. The American Mensa Guide to Casino Gambling: Winning Ways (Stirling, 1999) ISBN 0-8069-4837-X
- Grochowski, John. The Slot Machine Answer Book: How They Work, How They've Changed, and How to Overcome the House Advantage (Bonus Books, 2005) ISBN 1-56625-235-0
- Legato, Frank. How to Win Millions Playing Slot Machines! ...Or Lose Trying (Bonus Books, 2004) ISBN 1-56625-216-4
