= Southard Block =

- U.S. National Register of Historic Places
- U.S. Historic district – Contributing property
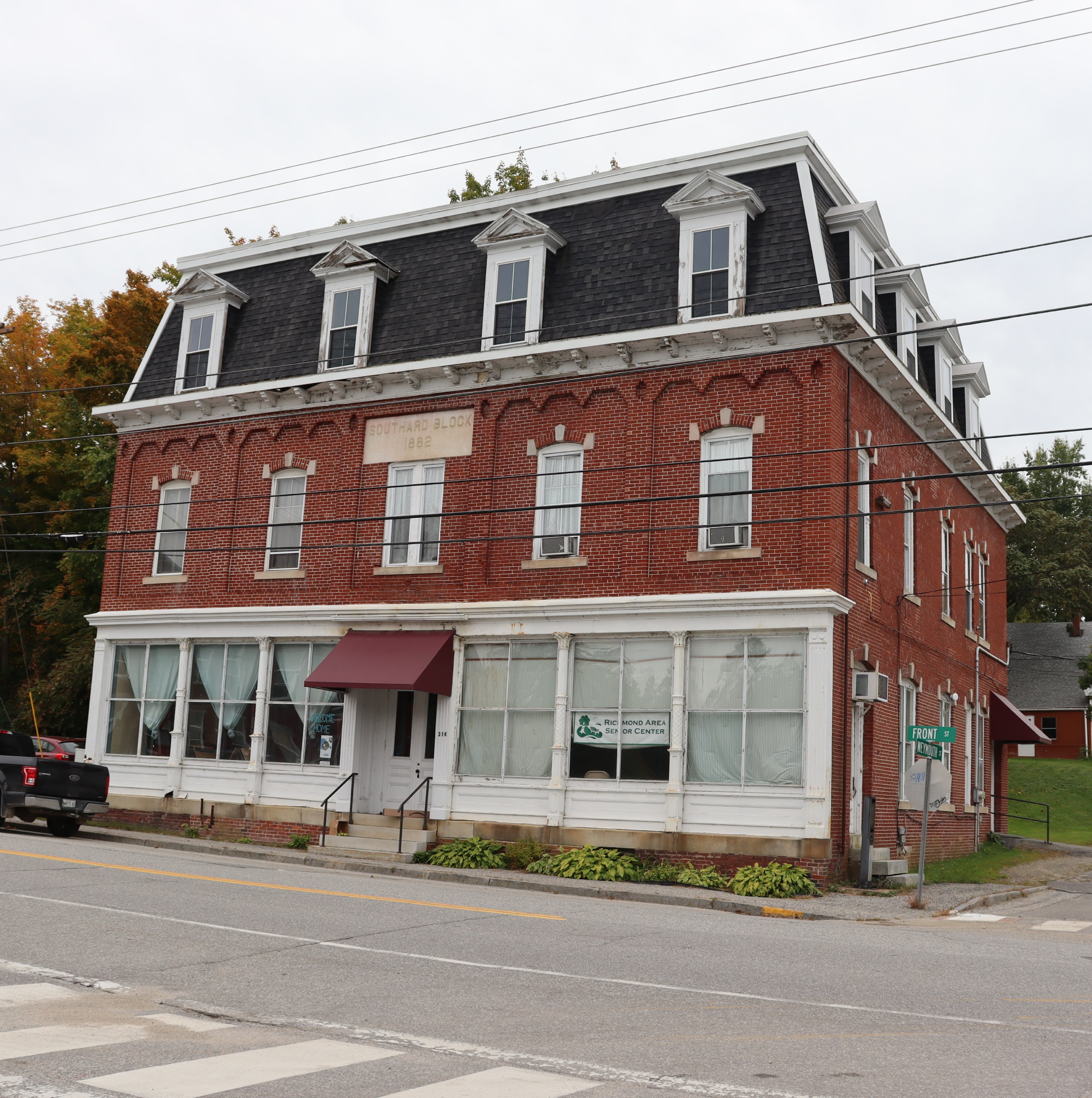
- Southard Block, October 2022

- Location within Maine Location within the United States
- Location: 25 Front Street, Richmond, Maine
- Coordinates: 44°5′26″N 69°51′9″W
- Area: 0 acres (0 ha)
- Built: 1882
- Built by: Southard, T. J.; Rollins, T. M.
- Part of: Richmond Historic District (ID73000146)
- NRHP reference No.: 72000079

Significant dates
- Added to NRHP: February 23, 1972
- Designated CP: November 12, 1973

The Southard Block is a historic commercial building at 25 Front Street in the village center of Richmond, Maine. Built in 1882, it is one of the small community's prominent commercial buildings, with distinctive Second Empire styling. It was built by T.J. Southard, the town's leading shipbuilder of the period. It was listed on the National Register of Historic Places in 1972.

== Description and history ==
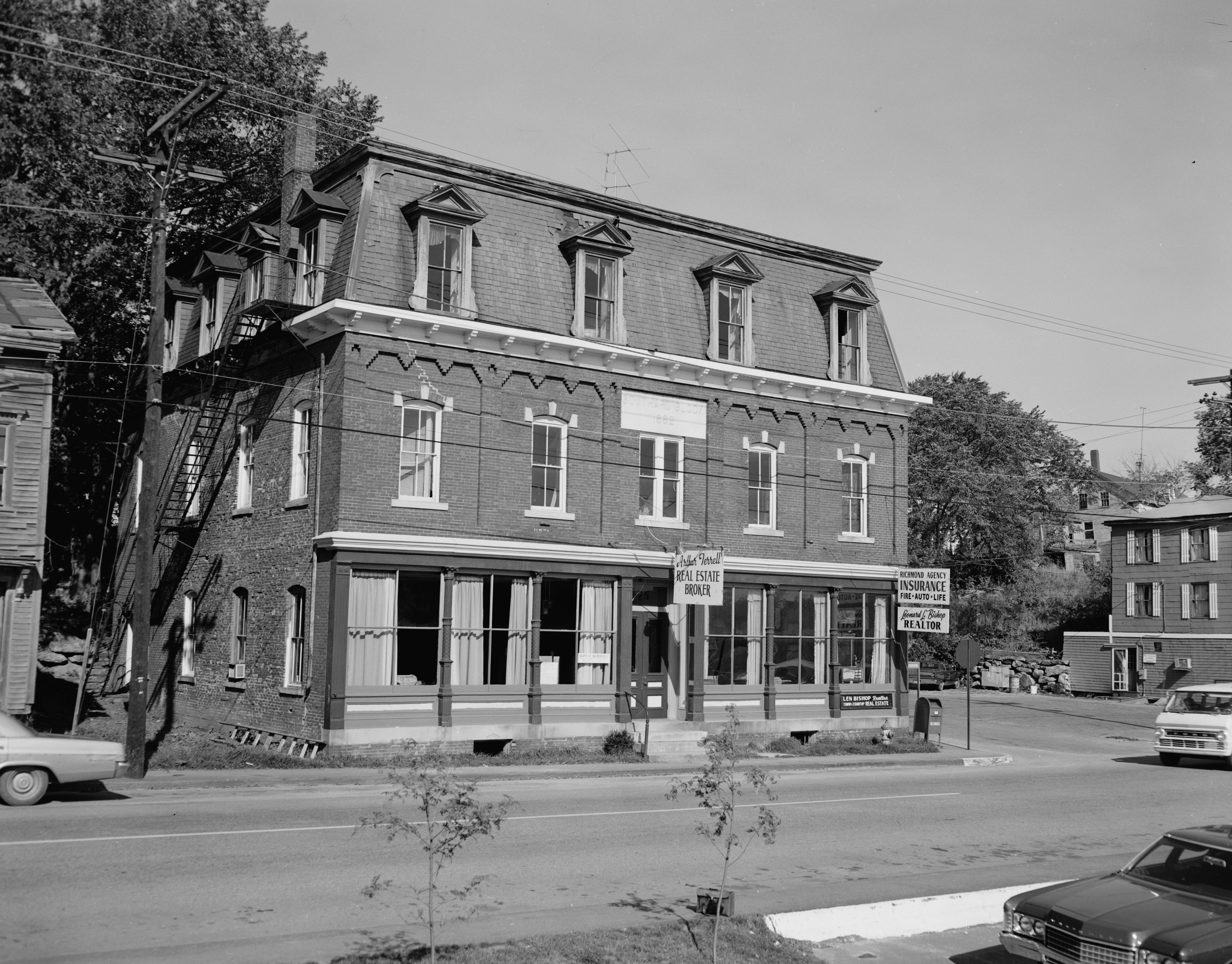
HABS photo, 1971

The Southard Block stands in the village center of Richmond, on the west side of Front Street at the junction with Weymouth Street. It is a 2-1/2 story brick building, with a dormered mansard roof providing a full third story. It has a single storefront on the ground floor, with two bays of display windows on each side of a central recessed entrance; these elements are framed by cast iron elements, including pilasters at the building corners. The second floor is five bays wide, with sash windows set in segmented-arch openings topped by brick headers with stone keystone and shoulder elements. The main roof cornice is deep and studded with medallions, and the roof dormers have fully pedimented gables.

The town of Richmond was a major shipbuilding center on the Kennebec River in the mid-19th century, and T.J. Southard was its most prominent builder and businessman, operating not just a shipyard, but also a local dry goods store, grist mill, and cotton mill. This building was constructed by Southard in 1880–83, and served as the heart of his empire. The interior retains original elements associated with his bank vault and counting room. It now houses a local senior center.

== See also ==
- National Register of Historic Places listings in Sagadahoc County, Maine
