= Slot machines by country =

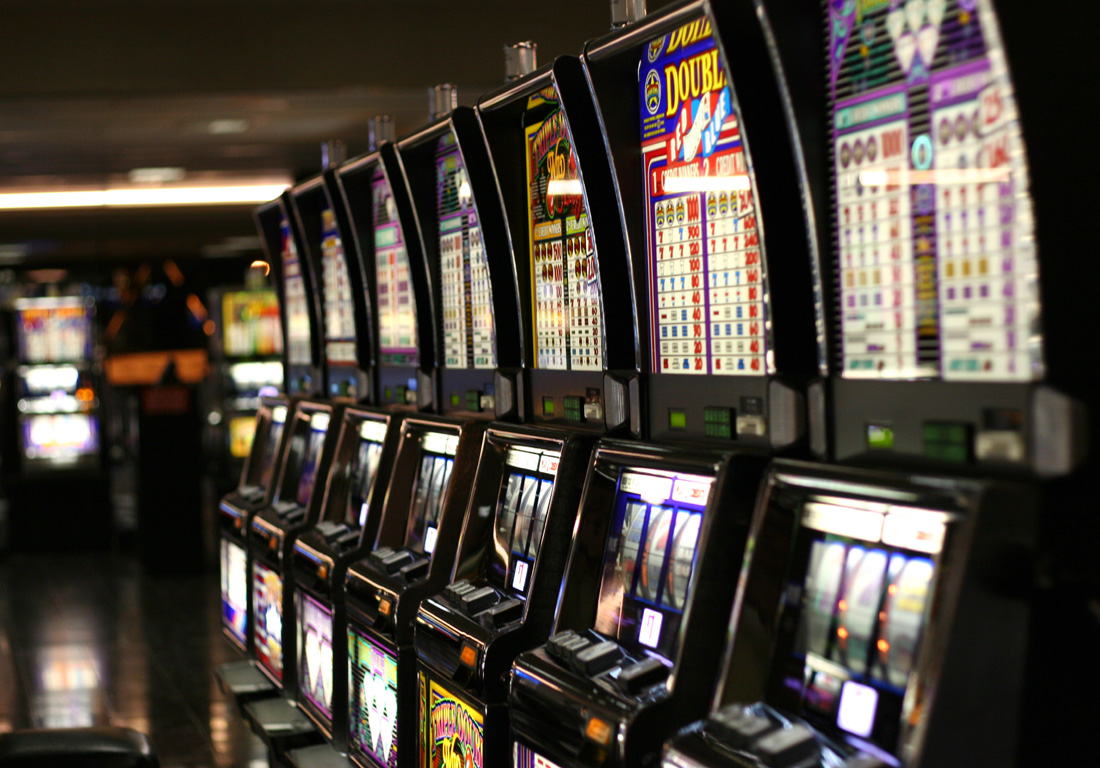
Row of slot machines inside Las Vegas airport.

Slot machine terminology, characteristics and regulations vary around the world.

== Slot machines by country ==
=== Australia ===
In Australia "poker machines" or "pokies" are officially termed gaming machines. Australian-style gaming machines frequently use video displays to simulate physical reels, usually five. These machines have additional bonusing and second-screen features such as free games and bonus levels. They also allow for multiple lines (up to 200) or multiple ways (up to 3,125) to be played.

On multiway games, players play the entire position of each reel instead of fixed lines or patterns. For instance, if a player plays 1 reel on a 243 way game, they receive three symbols in the first reel which pay anywhere in the three positions, while all other reels pay in the centre only, with unused areas darkened. On the other end of the scale, if the player plays 5 reels, symbols can appear anywhere in the window and will pay as long as there is one in each reel. Most games however still require the symbols appearing left to right, sometimes this even includes scatters. Scatter symbols still pay the same as per conventional games, multiplying their pay amount by the total bet and the number of ways/reels played. Other multiway games give you even more ways by using a 4x5 or 5x5 pattern, where there are up to 5 symbols in each reel, allowing for up to 1,024 and 3,125 ways to win respectively. Aristocrat calls these games Xtra Reel Power and Super Reel Power respectively. These games typically cost more than their 243 way Reel Power counterparts. Recently, IGT has also started to manufacture multiway games. Gaming machine manufacturer Konami Australia also made an alternative way of gaming by using patterns, where symbols pay adjacent to one another. Most of these games have a hexagonal reel formation, and much like multiway games, any patterns not played are darkened out of use. On both systems, scatter symbols still pay in the darkened areas just like standard machines where scatters don't have to appear on a payline.

The laws regulating the use of gaming machines in Australia are a matter for state governments, and as such they vary between states.

Gaming machines are found in casinos (approximately one in each major city) as well as pubs and clubs in some states (usually sports, social, or RSL clubs). The first Australian state to legalize this style of gambling was New South Wales in 1956 when they were made legal in all registered clubs in the state. There has been huge research into proving that the proliferation of poker machines has led to increased levels of problem gambling; however more research is certainly required to understand exactly what the impacts will have on society into the future.

In 1999 the Australian Productivity Commission reported that Australia had nearly 185,000 poker machines, more than half of which were in New South Wales. This figure represented 20% of comparable machines in the world or 2.4% of all the varying gambling and prize based machines in the world (excluding those that are illegal), and on a per capita basis, Australia had roughly five times as many gaming machines as the United States. Revenue from gaming machines in pubs and clubs accounts for more than half of the $4 billion in gambling revenue collected by state governments in fiscal year 2002 – 03

In Queensland, gaming machines in pubs and clubs must provide a return rate of 85% while machines located in casinos must provide a return rate of 90%. Most other states have similar provisions.

In Victoria, gaming machines must provide a minimum return rate of 85% (including jackpot contribution), including machines in Crown Casino. As of December 1, 2007, all gaming machines with support for $100 notes were banned due to an amendment to the gaming laws; all gaming machines made since 2003 comply with this rule. This new law also banned machines which would automatically play with the button held. One exception to these laws exists in Crown Casino, any player with a VIP loyalty card can still insert $100 notes and use the autoplay feature, whereby the machine will continue to play without player intervention until credit is exhausted or the player intervenes. All gaming machines in Victoria have an information screen accessible to the user by pressing the 'i key' button, showing the game rules, paytable, return to player percentage, and the top and bottom five combinations, with the odds shown. These combinations are stated to be played on a minimum bet (usually 1 credit per line, with 1 line or reel played), excluding feature wins.

Western Australia only permits the use of particular forms of gaming machine in Burswood Casino, and no gaming machines may be used elsewhere. This policy (the most restrictive in Australia) had a long historical basis, and was reaffirmed by the 1974 Royal Commission into Gambling:

...poker machine playing is a mindless, repetitive and insidious form of gambling which has many undesirable features. It requires no thought, no skill or social contact. The odds are never about winning. Watching people playing the machines over long periods of time, the impressionistic evidence at least is that they are addictive to many people. Historically poker machines have been banned from Western Australia and we consider that, in the public interest, they should stay banned.

— Report of the Royal Commission into Gambling 1974, p. 72

=== Japan ===
Japanese slot machines, known as pachisuro or pachislo (portmanteaus of the words "pachinko" and "slot machine"), are a descendant of the traditional Japanese pachinko game. Slot machines are a fairly new phenomenon and they can be found in mostly in pachinko parlors and the adult sections of amusement arcades, known as game centers.

=== New Zealand ===
Slot machines, commonly called "pokies", were introduced into New Zealand in 1991. A 2009 study linked the prevalence of slot machines with high crime levels.

=== Norway ===
In Norway, slot machines were banned in 2007.

=== United Kingdom ===
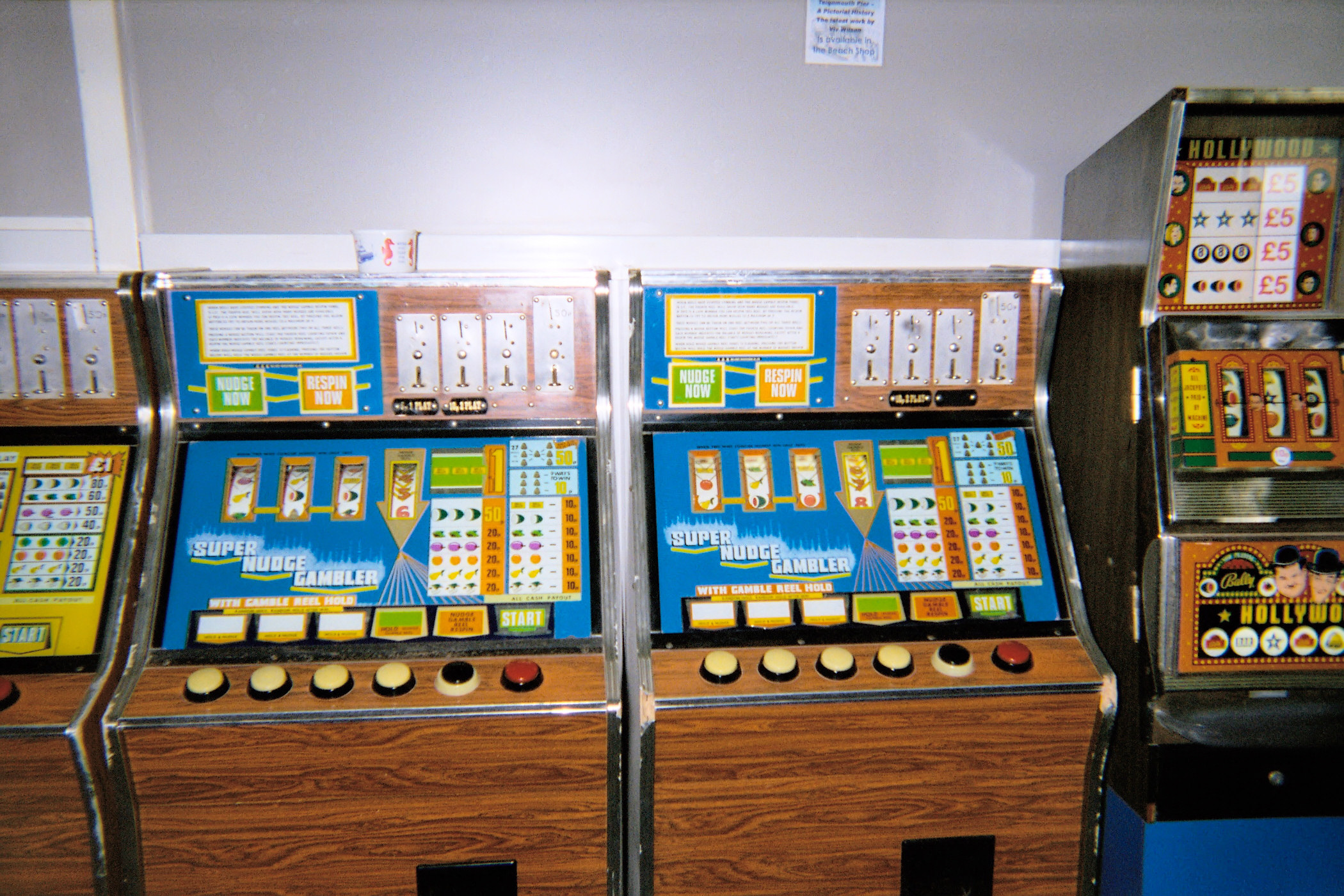
Row of old fruit machines in Teignmouth Pier, Devon

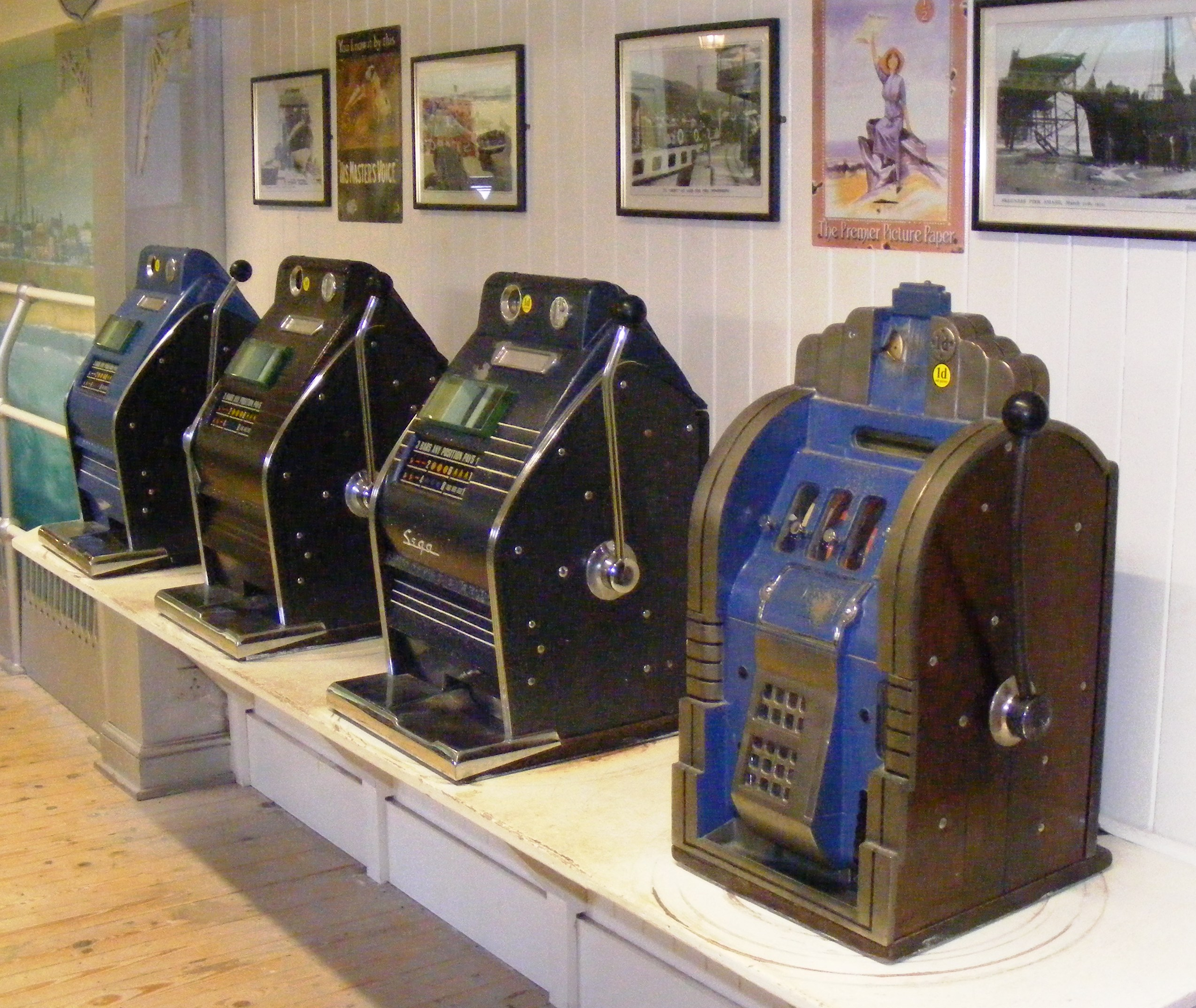
One armed bandits at Wookey Hole Caves

The provision of slot machines is covered by the Gambling Act 2005. This superseded the Gaming Act 1968.

Slot machines in the UK are categorised by definitions produced by the Gambling Commission as part of the legislation brought in with the Gambling Act of 2005.

Machine category	Maximum stake (from June 2009)	Maximum prize (from June 2009)
A	Unlimited	Unlimited
B1	£2	£4,000
B2	£100 (in multiples of £10)	£500
B3	£1	£500
B3A	£1	£500
B4	£1	£250
C	£1	£70
D (various)	10p to £1	£8 cash or £50 non-cash

Casinos built under the provisions of the 1968 Act are allowed to house up to twenty machines categories B to D or any number of C or D machines instead. As defined by the 2005 Act, large casinos will have a maximum of one hundred and fifty machines of any combination of machines in categories B to D, within the total limit of one hundred and fifty (subject to machine to table ratio of 5:1) and small casinos will have a maximum of eighty machines of any combination of machines in categories B to D, within the total limit of eighty (subject to machine to table ratio of 2:1).

==== Category A ====
Category A games were defined in preparation for the planned "Super Casinos". Despite a lengthy bidding process, with Manchester being chosen as the single planned location, the development was cancelled soon after Gordon Brown became Prime Minister of the United Kingdom. As a result, there are no lawful Category A games in the UK.

==== Category B ====
Category B games are divided into subcategories. However, the differences between B1, B3 and B4 games are mainly the stake and prizes as defined in the above table. Category B2 games – Fixed odds betting terminals (FOBTs) – have quite different stake and prize rules. FOBTs are mainly found in licensed betting shops, or bookmakers, in the form of electronic roulette.

The games are based on a random number generator (e.g. through the application of the uncertainty principle) and thus the probability of getting the jackpot in each game is independent of any other game, and these probabilities are all equal. If a pseudorandom number generator is used instead of one that is truly random, the probabilities are not truly independent, since each pseudorandom number is determined at least in part by the one generated before it.

==== Category C ====
Category C games are often referred to as fruit machines, one-armed bandits and AWP (amusement with prize). Fruit machines are commonly found in pubs, clubs, and arcades. Machines commonly have three reels, but can be found with four or five reels with around sixteen to twenty-four symbols printed around them. The reels are spun each play, and if certain combinations of symbols appear then winnings are paid by the machine, or a subgame is played. These games often have many extra features, trails and subgames with opportunities to win money; usually more than can be won from just the payouts on the reel combinations.

Fruit machines in the UK almost universally have the following features, generally selected at random using a pseudorandom number generator:

- A player (known in the industry as a punter) may be given the opportunity to hold one or more reels before spinning, meaning that the reel will not be spun at the next play, but will instead retain its setting at the previous spin. This can sometimes increase the chance of winning, especially if two or more reels are held.
- A player may also be given a number of nudges following a spin (or, in some machines, as a result in a subgame). A nudge is a single step rotation of a reel of the player's choice (although the machine may not allow all reels to be nudged for a particular play).
- Cheats can also be made available on the internet or through emailed newsletters for subscribers. These cheats give the player the impression of an advantage, whereas in reality the payout percentage remains exactly the same. The most widely used cheat is known as Hold after a nudge and increases the chance that the player will win following an unsuccessful nudge. The cheats give the player an incentive to play the latest games.

It is known for machines to pay out multiple jackpots, one after the other (this is known as a streak or rave) but each jackpot requires a new game to be played so as not to violate the law about the maximum payout on a single play. The minimum payout percentage is 70%, with pubs often setting the payout at around 78%.

These machines also operate differently from truly random slot machines. The latter are programmed to pay a percentage over the long run. Fruit machines in the UK are usually based on a compensated mathematical model, which means that a machine that has paid out above its target percentage is less likely to pay out than were it to have paid out below that percentage.

=== United States ===
In the United States, the public and private availability of slot machines is highly regulated by state governments. Many states have established gaming control boards to regulate the possession and use of slot machines. Nevada is the only state that has no significant restrictions against slot machines both for public and private use. In New Jersey, slot machines are only allowed in hotel casinos operated in Atlantic City. Several states (such as Indiana, Iowa, Louisiana and Missouri) allow slot machines (as well as any casino-style gambling) only on licensed riverboats or permanently anchored barges. Since Hurricane Katrina, Mississippi has removed the requirement that casinos on the Gulf Coast operate on barges and now allows them on land along the shoreline. Delaware allows slot machines at three horse tracks; they are regulated by the state lottery commission. Illinois would legalize a wider expansion of video gambling outside casinos in 2009.

The Indian Gaming Regulatory Act generally prohibits Native American casinos from offering "Class III" gaming without entering into a tribal-state compact approved by the Department of the Interior. Class III gaming covers all other games that are not otherwise regulated as "Class I" (traditional tribal social games played for small prizes) and "Class II" (bingo and games "similar to bingo" played competitively against other players, such as pull-tabs or punch boards, and explicitly excluding slot machines and card games played solely against the house) under the law.

Class I and II games are regulated by the National Indian Gaming Commission and individual tribes, and do not require state approval to run if they already permit tribal gaming. As a workaround, gaming companies developed slot machines compliant with Class II operation, which abstract the result of a class II game such as bingo (conducted between other players using a centralized computer system) to generate a pre-determined result for the reels as an entertainment display, allowing for a similar experience to an RNG-based "Vegas-style" slot machine.

Some "Instant Racing" or "historic racing" games operate in a similar manner; their results and payouts are based upon wagers on the outcomes of previously-held horse races, using the parimutuel betting system. These machines often use slot reels as entertainment displays in a similar manner.

In some regions of the U.S., such as Pennsylvania, a variety of unregulated slot machines marketed as being a game of skill have become common, usually located in restaurants, bars, and convenience stores. They add a basic skill-based mechanic, requiring players to place a "wild" on one of 9 symbols in a 3-by-3 grid to form a matching pay combination. The legality of these machines have been questioned, with critics having accused their manufacturers and operators of using the games to skirt gambling laws.

== See also ==
- United States state slot machine ownership regulations
- European Gaming & Amusement Federation
- Quiz machine
