= Richmond Historic District =

Historic district in Maine, United States

- U.S. National Register of Historic Places
- U.S. Historic district
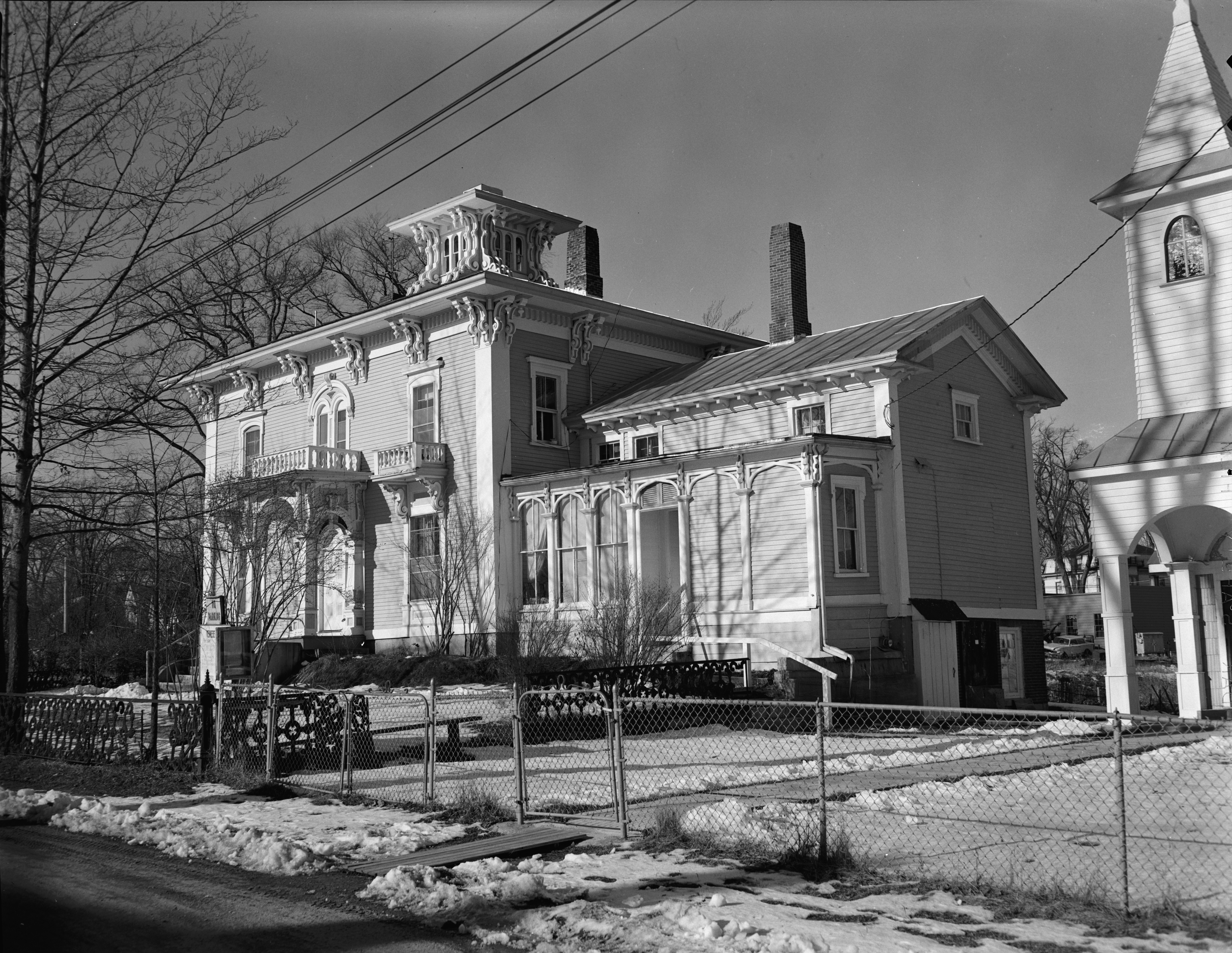
- The T.J. Southard House, HABS photo 1971

- Location within Maine Location within the United States
- Location: Roughly bounded by South, High, Kimbal Sts., and the Kennebec River, Richmond, Maine
- Coordinates: 44°5′9″N 69°48′7″W
- Area: 100 acres (40 ha)
- Built: 1815
- Architectural style: Greek Revival, Late Victorian
- NRHP reference No.: 73000146
- Added to NRHP: November 12, 1973

The Richmond Historic District encompasses the historic village center of Richmond, Maine. Established in the 17th century, the town reached its height of prosperity in the 19th century as a major shipbuilding center on the Kennebec River. The district was listed on the National Register of Historic Places in 1973.

== Description and history ==
The town of Richmond's history dates to 1649, when land in the area was purchased from Native Americans by Christopher Lawson. A fort was built here in 1719 as a defense against Native American attacks, which was abandoned after the construction of forts further up the Kennebec River. Richmond was incorporated as part of Bowdoinham in 1762, and separated from that town in 1823. During the 19th century, it was a major local shipbuilding center, producing more than 200 ships between 1815 and 1890, the height of its economic success. One of the results of this economic success are a well-preserved collection of residential and commercial architecture in its village center; none of its shipbuilding yards have survived.

The historic district is bounded on the north by Kimball Street, the west by High Street, the south by South Street, and the east by the Kennebec River. This area includes a stretch of modest commercial development on Main Street, which runs perpendicular to the river, with a few fine brick commercial buildings on River Street as well. Prominent buildings include the four-story Greek Revival Hathorn Block, built in 1850 by Jefferson Hathorn, a prominent local shipbuilder and captain. The 1882 Southard Block, also on River Street, was built by T.J. Southard, the town's leading shipbuilder of that period. Southard's house was built in 1855, and is one of the state's finest examples of Italianate architecture.

== See also ==
- National Register of Historic Places listings in Sagadahoc County, Maine
