= Ticket-in, ticket-out =

Slot machine system

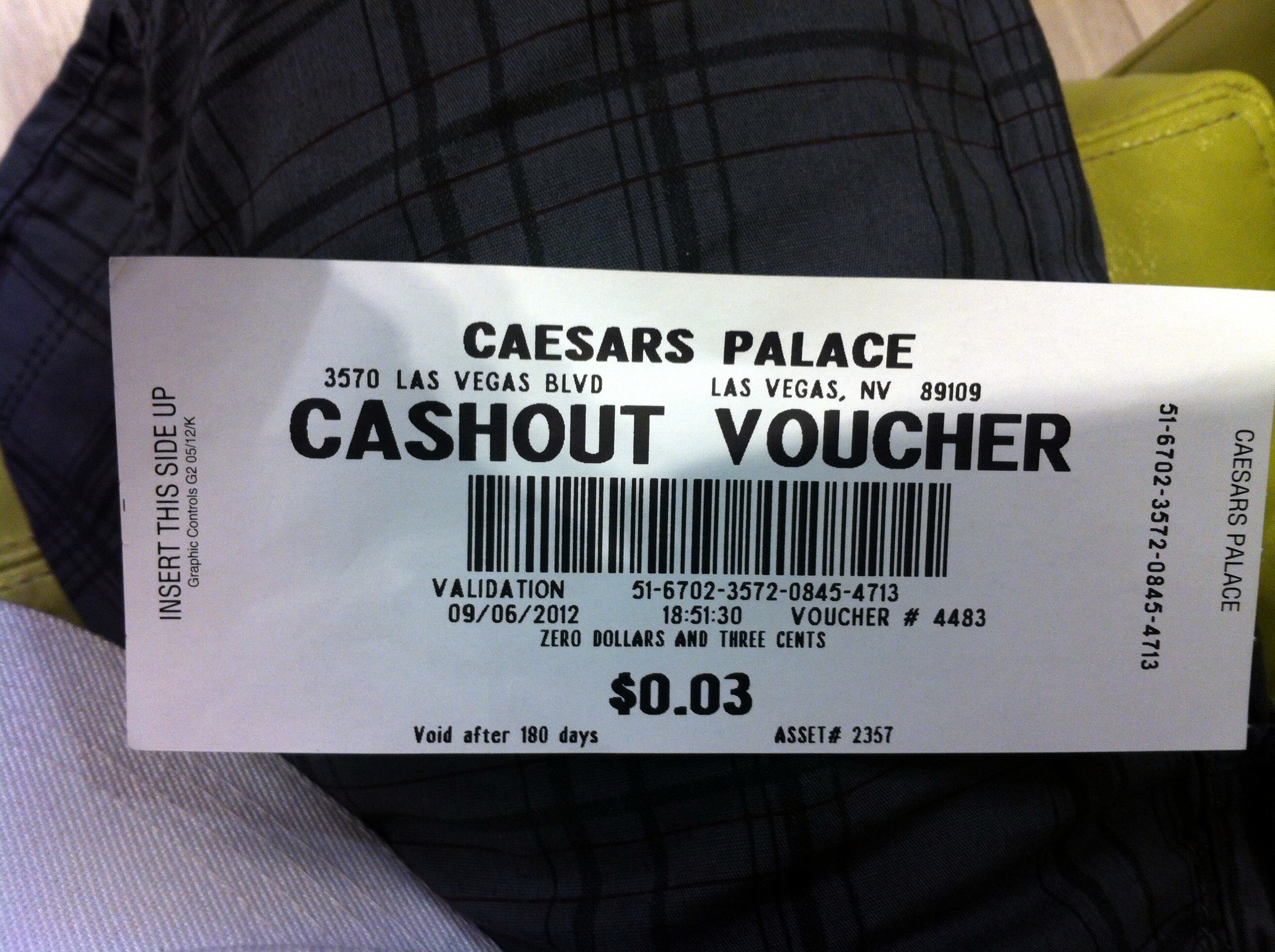
A ticket from a slot machine at Caesars Palace in Las Vegas, Nevada.

Ticket-in, ticket-out (TITO) is a technology used in modern slot machines and other electronic gambling machines in which the machine pays out the player's money by printing a barcoded ticket rather than dispensing coins or tokens. The player may then redeem the ticket for cash at a designated location in the gambling establishment, or redeem it for credit at another machine within the establishment. Ticket in and ticket out is to keep the machine from being tampered with and to keep people from cheating the casino.

== Overview ==
Ticket-in, ticket out (TITO) machines are used in casino slot machines to print out a slip of paper with a barcode indicating the amount of money represented. These can in turn be redeemed for cash at an automated kiosk. The machines utilize a barcode reader built into the bill acceptor, a thermal ticket printer in place of a coin hopper (some rare machines are set up to pay with coins if the payout is less than the payout limit, and to print a ticket in situations where a handpay would normally be required) and a network interface to communicate with a central system that tracks tickets.

== Consortium of manufacturers ==
MGM was in the middle of construction of its major hotel in Las Vegas and invited several gaming machine manufacturers to join a consortium for its Cashless Casino experiment. In the group were Bally Gaming, IGT, Sigma Games, Universal and several others. They were all presented with the MGM UIB Protocol documents and were aided in the realization of the protocol on their gaming platforms. The first trial of the system was actually at the Desert Inn property. MGM Had situated several trailers in the parking lot where the manufacturers could bring their gaming devices for test before being installed on the field trial at the Desert Inn.

== Completion of the IGT field trial in Nevada ==
On September 29, 2000, IGT announced that its EZ Pay Ticket System successfully completed a field trial at the Fiesta Hotel & Casino in Las Vegas, which resulted in formal written approval from the Nevada Gaming Control Board for installation throughout Nevada.

== Advantages and disadvantages ==
Like any system, TITO has its share of advantages and disadvantages.

=== Advantages ===
- Hopper fills for TITO machines are virtually eliminated.
- Casino patrons no longer have to wait for an attendant to perform a hand pay for large payouts, although most casinos hand pay anything over $2,000.
- Makes multi-denomination gaming machines possible.
- Streamlines accounting procedures due to reduced cash handling
- Enables ticketed bonusing, coupons and drawings.

=== Disadvantages ===
- May cause some people to disassociate gambling using tickets from gambling using cash, in much the same way "credits" are indicated on some machines rather than a cash value.
- Tickets can be easier to misplace than a large bucket of coins.
- The lack of the sound of a big coin pay out is a turnoff for some players. Due to this, manufacturers added multimedia sound to the machines to reproduce the sound of coins falling when a prize hits.
- This system is a common part of money laundering activities by criminal elements to 'wash' cash received as proceeds of crime.
