= Hand pay =

Condition where a slot machine cannot pay the patron

A hand pay (or handpay) is a condition where a slot machine cannot pay the patron in the typical manner, requiring the casino staff (such as the floor attendant or cashier) to pay the customer out manually (i.e., by hand).

In casinos which use coin in, coin out systems, a hand pay may be caused by a coin jam, inadequate supply of coins in the machine's hopper to pay the requested amount, or another problem with the coin out mechanism. A hand pay can also be triggered when the win is large enough that the number of coins required to pay out the win would be excessive.

In casinos that use ticket in, ticket out (cashless) systems, a hand pay can be caused by communication or other issues with the ticket printer. More frequently, it is caused by communication problems with the server which tracks and assigns ticket serial numbers.

== Gameplay ==
Hand pays also occur whenever the amount of the win is over the minimum taxable win amount for the jurisdiction that the machine is in. Hand paying allows a floor attendant to collect the patron's identification and tax ID numbers (such as the Social Security number in the United States), and other pertinent information, such as the winning combination. The patron is then provided with the applicable tax forms. In the United States, a hand pay will normally occur for slot machine or electronic bingo winnings over $1,999.99, which is the amount above which winnings must be reported to the IRS; some states may have lower thresholds where the taxes must be reported to the state revenue office. Citizens of the United States winning in that country will receive a W-2G tax form, and often a W-9 form to validate that the Social Security number they provided is correct.

To perform a hand pay, a floor attendant may complete a form which the patron presents to the cash cage to be paid out. In other casinos, the floor attendant will retrieve the funds and pay the patron directly. (The latter is typical for hand pays resulting from taxable wins.) Most casinos will require an electronic record of the hand pay to be made through the slot accounting system.
