= United States slot machine ownership regulations by state =

Laws restricting noncommercial ownership/use of mechanical & digital games of chance

This is a list of potential restrictions and regulations on private ownership of slot machines in the United States on a state by state basis.

State	Legal Status
Alabama	Class II machines legal
Alaska	All machines legal
Arizona	All machines legal
Arkansas	All machines legal
California	Machines 25 years or older legal
Colorado	Machines before 1984 legal
Connecticut	All machines prohibited
Delaware	Machines 25 years or older legal
Washington, D.C.	Machines before 1952 legal
Florida	Machines 20 years or older legal
Georgia	Machines before 1950 legal
Hawaii	All machines prohibited
Idaho	Machines before 1950 legal
Illinois	Machines 25 years or older legal
Indiana	Machines 40 years or older legal
Iowa	Machines 25 years or older legal
Kansas	Machines before 1950 legal
Kentucky	All machines legal
Louisiana	Machines 25 years or older legal
Maine	All machines legal
Maryland	Machines 25 years or older legal
Massachusetts	Machines 30 years or older legal
Michigan	Machines 25 years or older legal
Minnesota	All machines legal
Mississippi	Machines 25 years or older legal
Missouri	Machines 30 years or older legal
Montana	Machines 25 years or older legal
Nebraska	All machines prohibited
Nevada	All machines legal
New Hampshire	Machines 25 years or older legal
New Jersey	Machines before 1941 legal
New Mexico	Machines 25 years or older legal
New York (state)	Machines 30 years or older legal
North Carolina	Machines 25 years or older legal
North Dakota	Machines 25 years or older legal
Ohio	All machines legal
Oklahoma	Machines 25 years or older legal
Oregon	Machines 25 years or older legal
Pennsylvania	Machines 25 years or older legal
Rhode Island	All machines legal
South Carolina	All machines prohibited
South Dakota	Machines before 1941 legal
Tennessee	Machines 20 years or older legal, starting 7/1/2021(SB1258)
Texas	all machines prohibited
Utah	All machines legal
Vermont	Machines before 1954 legal
Virginia	All machines legal
Washington	Machines 25 years or older legal
West Virginia	All machines legal
Wisconsin	Machines 25 years or older legal
Wyoming	Machines 25 years or older legal
