= Austin Powers (disambiguation) =

Austin Powers may refer to:

- Austin Powers, all films in the Austin Powers series:
  - Austin Powers: International Man of Mystery, the first Austin Powers film, 1997
  - Austin Powers: The Spy Who Shagged Me, the second Austin Powers film, 1999
  - Austin Powers in Goldmember, the third Austin Powers film, 2002
- Austin Powers (character), the eponymous main character of the film series
- Austin Powers: Welcome to My Underground Lair!, a 2000 video game based on the Austin Powers series
- Austin Powers Pinball, a 2002 video game based on the Austin Powers series
- Austin Powers Collectible Card Game, collectible card game based on the Austin Powers series

== See also ==
- List of Austin Powers characters
