= Count room =

Room for counting money

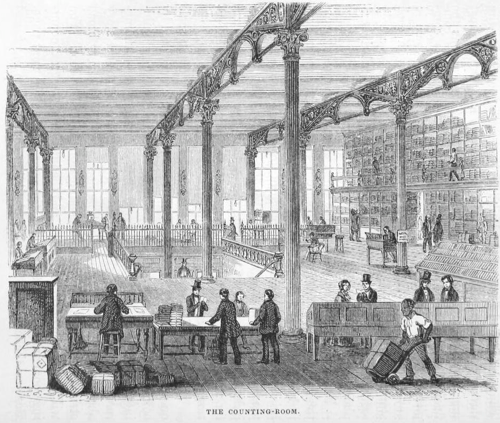
An illustration of a counting room, 1855

A count room or counting room is a room that is designed and equipped for the purpose of counting large volumes of currency. Count rooms are operated by central banks and casinos, as well as some large banks and armored car companies that transport currency.

A count room may be divided into two separate areas, one for counting banknotes (sometimes referred to as soft count) and one for counting coins (sometimes referred to as hard count). Some high-volume cash businesses, especially casinos, will operate two distinct rooms.
