= William Tucker (Virginia colony) =

First African-American to be born in colonial Virginia

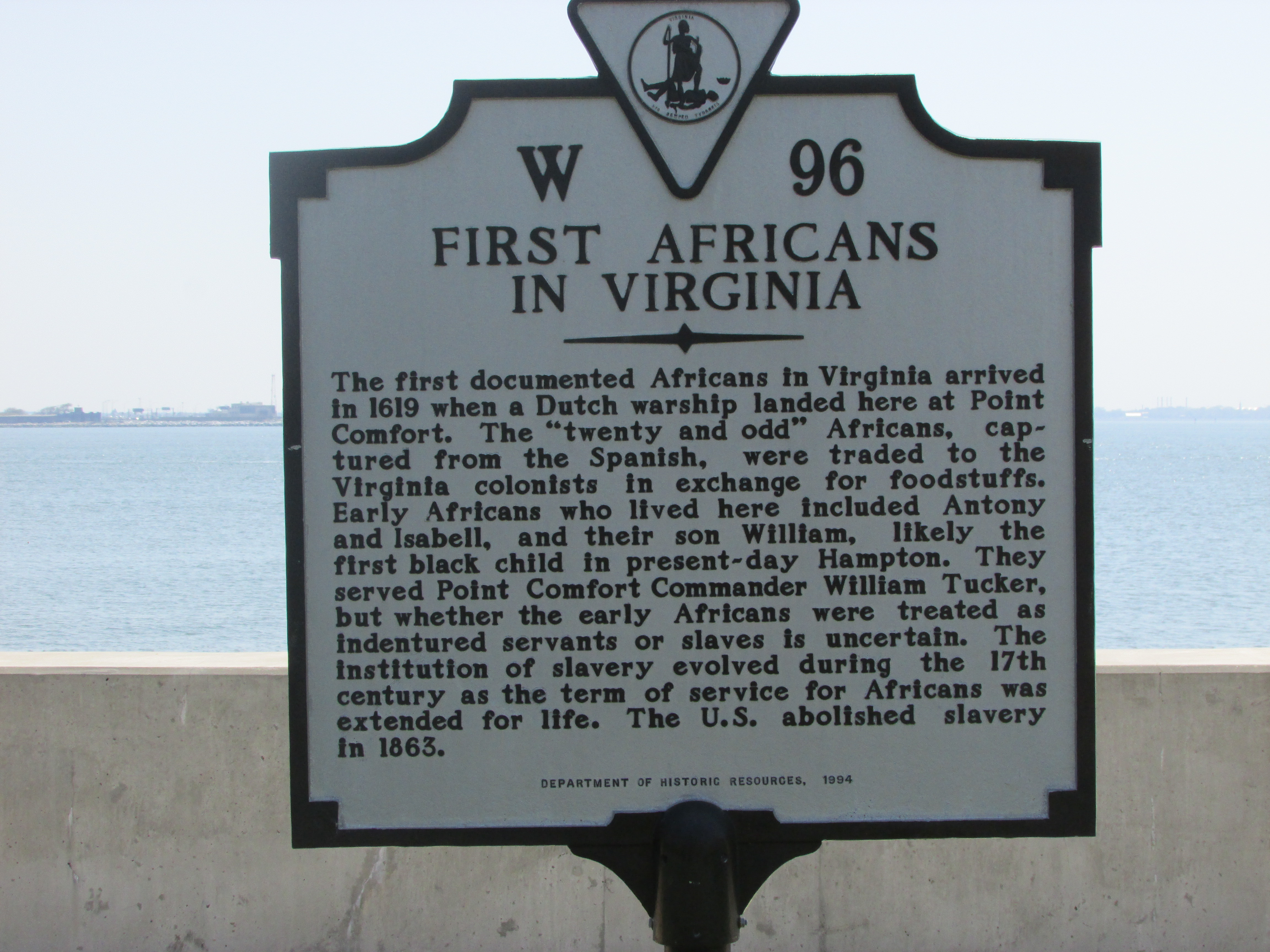
- Historical marker with William, Antony, and Isabell mentioned
- Born: c. 1624; Near Jamestown, Colony of Virginia
- Known for: First Virginian born to African parents
- Parent(s): Antoney and Isabell "Tucker"

William Tucker (b. c. 1624) was a Virginia-born child to two of the first Africans in Virginia who landed in Jamestown Colony before his birth. He was the first African American who was born in the British colonies that later became the United States.

== Birth ==
William Tucker was born near Jamestown of the Colony of Virginia c. 1624, and appears on the Virginia Muster of 1624/5, the first comprehensive census made in North America. His parents were Isabell and Anthony, African indentured servants. When he was born, there were 22 Africans in the colony, most of whom arrived in 1619.

His parents were servants to Mary and Captain William Tucker, who was an envoy to the Pamunkey Native Americans for the colony. (Note: Captain Tucker's surname was also spelled Tooker and Tuckar, which means that the surname may have applied to this William.) The Tucker plantation was located at or near the current site of Bluebird Gap Farm in Hampton.

Isabell and Anthony were wed in 1623 or before, with Captain Tucker's support. Under English law, indentured servants were not married while contracted for servitude. About the time William was born, there were two white children of indentured servants born in the colony. Captain Tucker had 17 servants.

== Baptism ==
He was baptized in the Anglican Church becoming the first African child baptized in English North America. He was named after Captain Tucker. The captain's plantation was located on the Hampton River. Nearby was a Native American village, once known as Kecoughtan, Virginia of the Kecoughtan tribe. It is now Hampton, Virginia. The closest Anglican Church was the Elizabeth City Parish, now the St. John's Episcopal Church.

There were two trains of thought about the baptism of African Americans. It was desirable to have as many Christians in the colony as possible. It was not believed, though, that baptizing a person changed their status as a servant or an enslaved person, which was formalized in 1667 by the Virginia Assembly. Enslaved people were still considered chattel, or personal property.

== Childhood ==
As a boy, he was considered one of the captain's 17 servants. Elizabeth City County, Virginia was established in 1634, reportedly with the support of William's parents. It is now Hampton, Virginia His parents were freed around 1635 (when William was about 10 or 11 years of age) and they established a farm in Kent County, Virginia.

== Legacy ==
The 2-acre Tucker Family Cemetery in Hampton was named after him. Next to the cemetery is the Aberdeen Gardens neighborhood that was established by African Americans. The cemetery, which was previously called the Old Colored Graveyard, contains the remains of people that believe they were related to William. There are many unmarked graves, but it is believed that he is interred there. It is around one mile to the Bluebird Gap Farm, which is believed to be the site of Captain William Tucker's plantation.
