= William Capps =

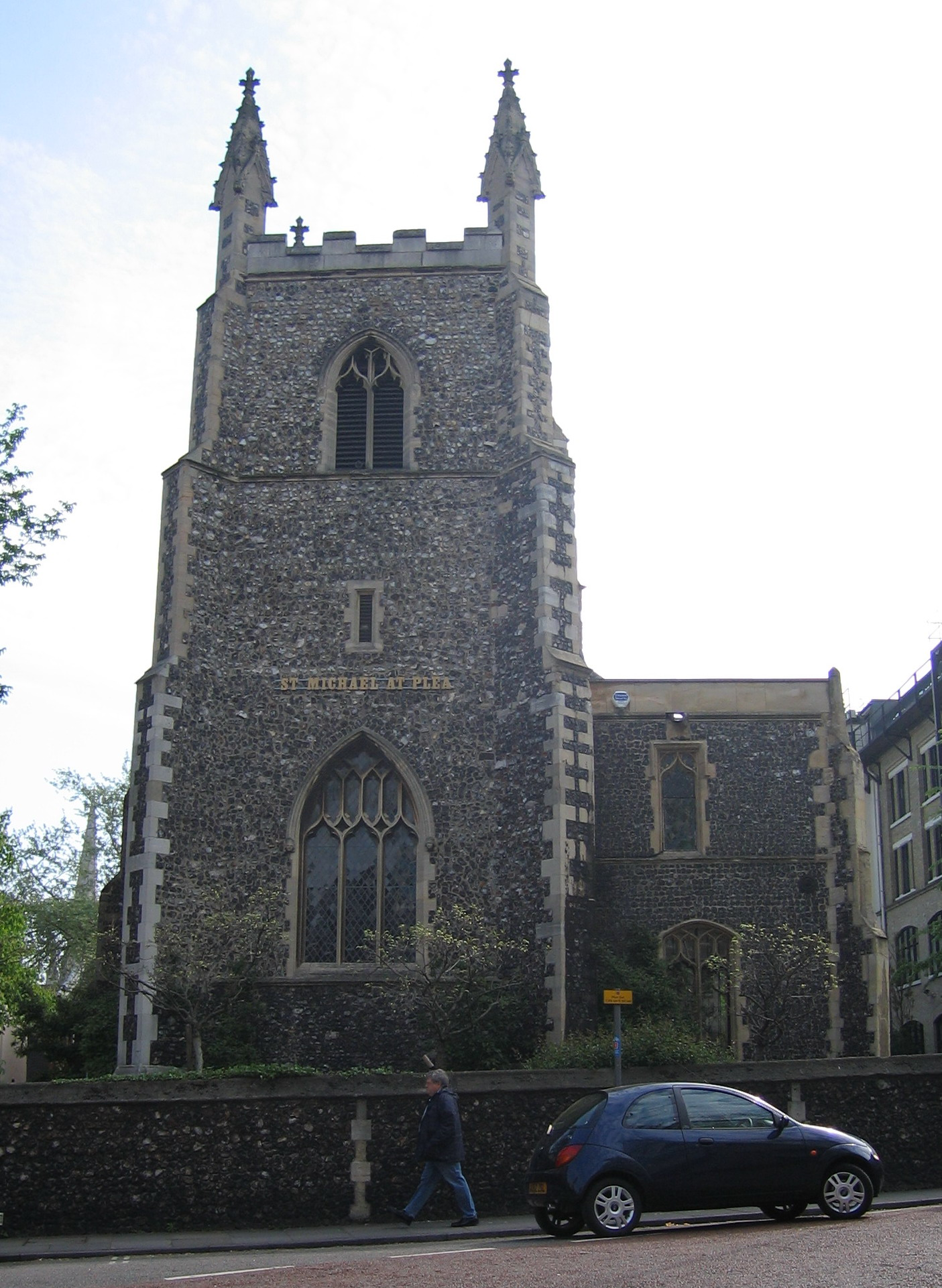
St Michael-at-Plea, Norwich, England, 2006

William Moss Capps Sr. (occasionally spelled Caps, Capp, or Cappes) was born in Norfolk, England in or around 1575. William married Catherine Jernagin (also spelt Katheryn Jermingham) in Norwich, Norfolk, England, December 11, 1596 at St Michael at Plea. He and his wife had five children together: Henry, Frances, Willoughby, Anne, and William.

== Arrival in Virginia ==
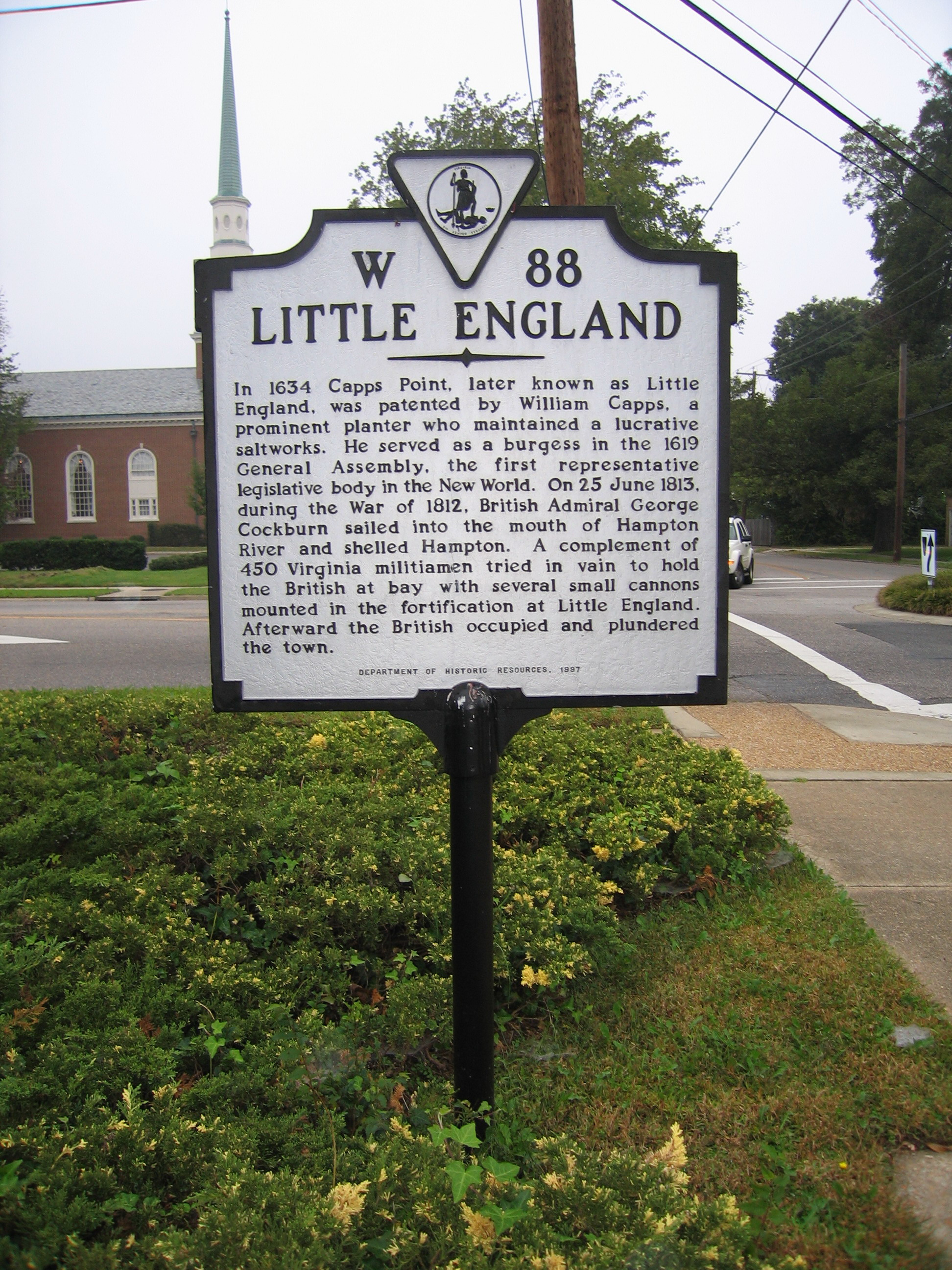
Capps Point Historical Marker, Hampton, Virginia

Capps traveled to the Colony of Virginia on the third supply mission c. 1609-1610. It is unclear whether he arrived at Jamestown safely with seven ships of the Third Supply flotilla (with John Ratcliffe and John Martin), orif he was marooned with Christopher Newport, George Somers, Thomas Gates, and the Sea Venture passengers.

William Capps settled at Kecoughtan on the west side of the Hampton River. This site is in present-day Hampton, Virginia and is opposite the grounds of the Hampton Institute. There is a street called "Capps Quarters" in this area that is almost certainly part of William Capps's original tract of land. A Virginia historical marker is posted in this area. This point of land, patented by William Capps about 1634, was known for a century as Capps Point. The area was later renamed Little England.

Kecoughtan was originally the site of an Indigenous American village, which on May 1, 1607 reportedly had 18 houses of twigs and bark and 20 fighting men. Indigenous Americans and European settlers lived together at this site for the first years of the Colony, but during the summer of 1610, Sir Thomas Gates drove the Kecoughtan Tribe from the area in retaliation for a settler being killed at Fort Algernourne (Old Point Comfort). The settlement grew slowly, as a report by John Rolfe in 1616 shows: "At Keqoughtan, being not farr from the mouth of the river, thirty-seven miles below James Towne on the same side, are twenty [persons] whereof eleven are Farmors."

== Ancient planter ==
By May 1616, only 350 of all persons who had come to Virginia remained there, the rest having died or given up and returned to England. Three years later, in 1619, the first general division of land in Virginia occurred. Settlers who arrived before 1616 and who had three years residence, termed "ancient planters," were entitled to 100 acres (0.40 km^{2}) of land. John Rolfe described the situation in January 1620 in glowing terms: "All the ancient planters being sett free have chosen places for their dividendes according to the commission, Which giveth all greate content, for knowing their owne landes, they strive and are prepared to build houses & cleere their groundes ready to plant, which giveth ... [them] greate incouragement, and the greatest hope to make the Colony florrish that ever yet happened to them."

== First House of Burgesses ==
In the same year as the land division, the Colony's Governor issued a call for the first representative legislative assembly in America, which convened at Jamestown on July 30, 1619 and remained in session until August 4, 1619. Twenty-two Burgesses met, representing the 11 major settlements in Virginia. The Kecoughtan settlement was represented by Captain William Tucker and William Capps. A memorial church, built on the foundations of the church in which the House of Burgesses met, exists at the Historic Jamestowne National Park Service site on Jamestown Island, Virginia. A monument bearing the names of the Burgesses is located nearby, within the confines of the newly rediscovered original Jamestown fort.

It was apparently at their urging that the first House of Burgesses was asked "to change the savage name of Kiccowtan, and to give that Incorporation a new name." The new name selected was Elizabeth City, in honor of King James's daughter. In December 1619, the population of Virginia was approximately 900, out of a total immigration of 1440 persons.

== Member Virginia Council ==
In 1627, William Capps was appointed a member of the Council by the Crown upon the Governor's recommendation. The Councilors were the Governor's advisers in executive matters and constituted the Colony's supreme court. They also held legislative functions as members of the upper house of the Virginia Assembly, which was similar to a modern U.S. senate. Two years later, William Capps asked leave of the Governor to depart the colony on the King's affairs, and when permission was refused, he departed anyway. In 1630, he returned with the King's letter of instructions to the Council.

== Death ==
William Moss Capps died in 1637, 8 years after the death of his wife Catherine.

== See also ==
- Victoria Boulevard Historic District ("Historic Little England")
