= Hampton Downtown Historic District =

Historic district in Virginia, United States

- U.S. National Register of Historic Places
- U.S. Historic district
- Virginia Landmarks Register
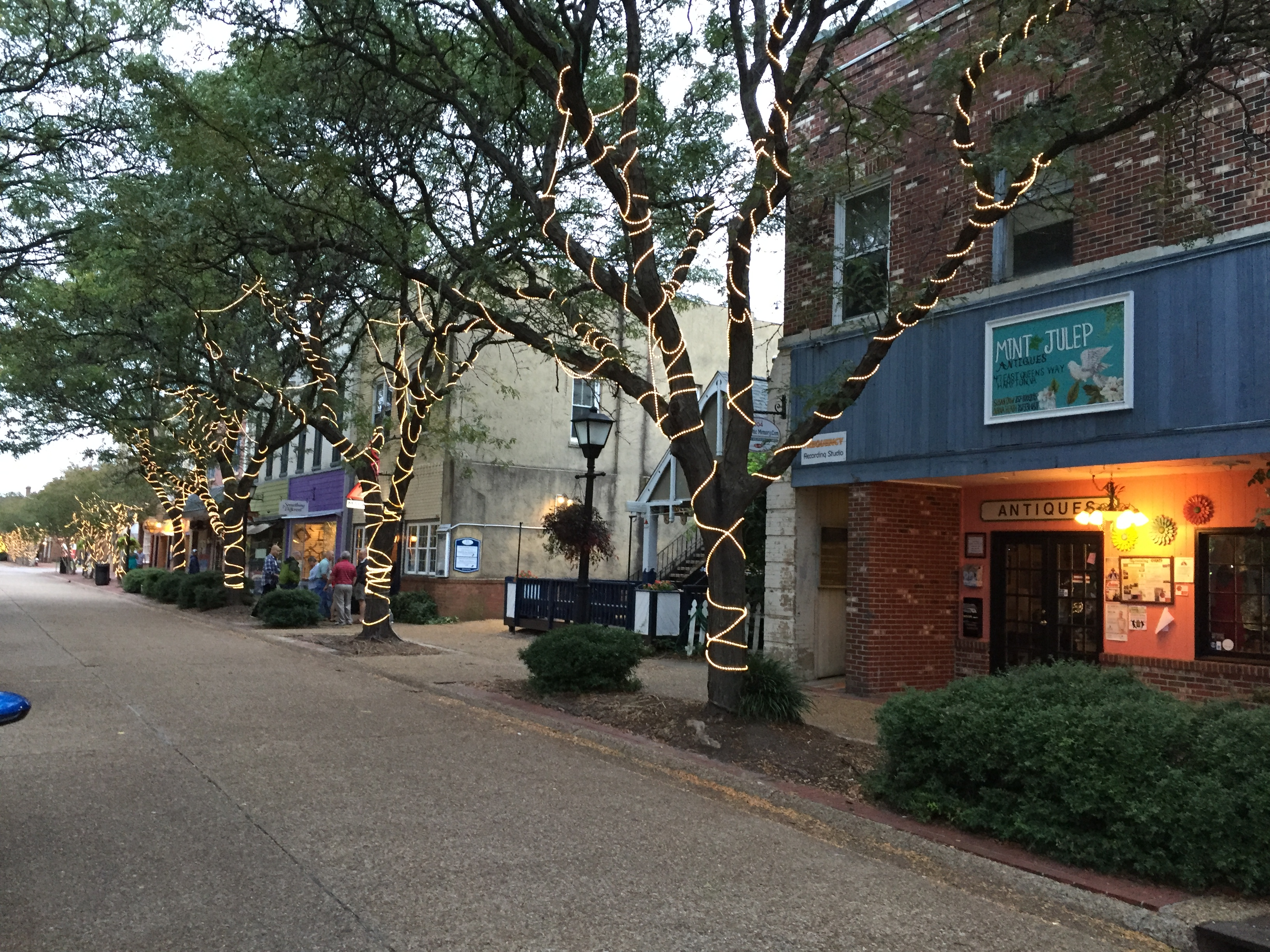

- Location within Virginia Location within the United States
- Location: Roughly bounded by Franklin St., Lincoln St., Settlers Landing Rd., Eaton St., Hampton, Virginia
- Coordinates: 37°01′34″N 76°20′40″W
- Area: 26 acres (11 ha)
- Built: 1691
- Architect: Multiple
- Architectural style: Gothic Revival, Beaux Arts, Art Deco
- NRHP reference No.: 10001062
- VLR No.: 114-5445

Significant dates
- Added to NRHP: December 27, 2010
- Designated VLR: September 30, 2010

Hampton Downtown Historic District is a national historic district located at Hampton, Virginia. The district encompasses 25 contributing buildings and 7 contributing sites in the central business district of Hampton. The district includes a variety of commercial, residential, institutional, and governmental buildings dating from the late-19th to mid-20th century. There are notable examples of the Beaux-Arts, Art Deco, and Gothic Revival styles. Notable buildings include First United Methodist Church (1887, 1931), the Sclater Building (1871), St. Tammany's Masonic Lodge (1888), Hampton Baptist Church (1883), Old Hampton Station Post Office (1914), and the circuit courthouse (1876). Located in the district and separately listed are St. John's Episcopal Church (1728) and the former Hampton City Hall (1939).

It was listed on the National Register of Historic Places in 2010.
