= Brissenden =

Brissenden is a surname. Notable people with the name include:

- Bob Brissenden (1928–1991), Australian poet, novelist, critic and academic
- Paul Frederick Brissenden (1885–1974), American labor historian
- Roy F. Brissenden (1919–1999), NASA physicist, engineer, teacher and inventor
