= William Tucker (Jamestown immigrant) =

English colonist and leader in Virginia (c1588 - 1642)

Captain William Tucker
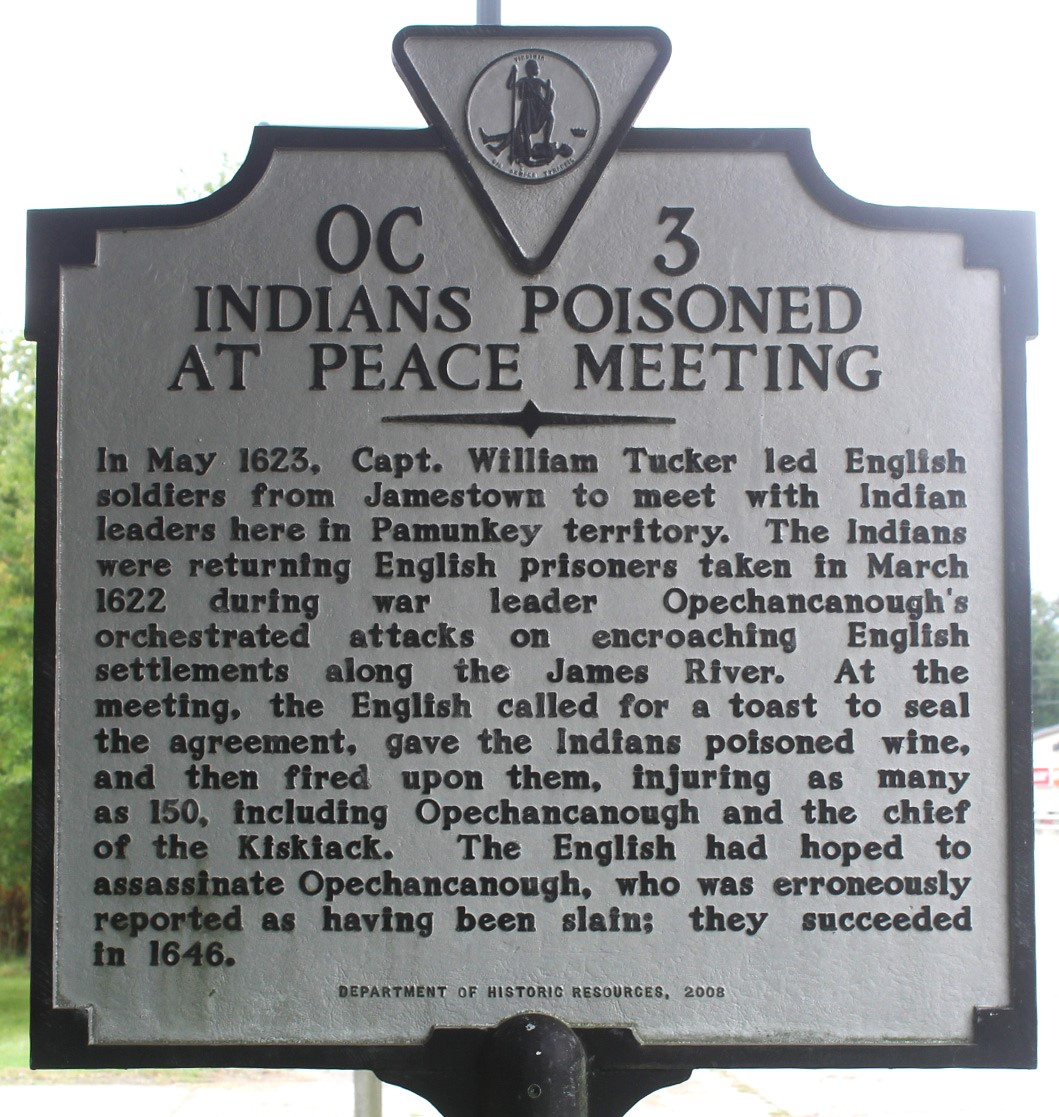
- Born: c. 1588; Cornwall, England
- Died: 1643 (aged 54–55); Elizabeth City County, Virginia
- Other names: Tooker, Tuckar
- Occupations: Military commander, Envoy to Pamunkey natives, Ancient planter, merchant
- Spouse: Mary Thomson (Thompson)

House of Burgesses
- In office 1619–1625

Virginia Governor's Council
- In office 1626–unknown

Military service
- Branch/service: Virginia colonial militia
- Years of service: 1619-1623
- Rank: Captain
- Commands: Kecoughtan, Virginia

Captain William Tucker (b. 1588 – d. 1643) was an English-born colonist and mass murderer. He settled in Jamestown of the Colony of Virginia in the early 17th century. He was a military commander. In 1623, in retaliation for the Indian massacre of 1622, Tucker offered a toast during a supposed negotiation with members of the Powhatan Confederacy. The wine was mixed with a poison prepared by physician John Pott. The wine killed hundreds of Native Americans and another 50 were slain during the event. Tucker owned land with his brothers-in-law and was a member of the House of Burgesses, a commission of the peace, and was appointed to the Council.

== Early life and family ==
William Tucker was born in Cornwall on January 7, 1588 or in 1589. In 1610, he sailed on the ship Mary and Thomas (sometimes written as Mary and James) to Virginia. Tucker was married to Mary Thompson, who was born in 1599. Her father was Robert Thompson of Watton-at-Stone, Hertfordshire and her nephew was John Thompson, 1st Baron Haversham.

Mary sailed with her brothers: William, George, and Paul on the ship, George, and arrived in the colony in 1623. Tucker paid for the passage of his wife's brothers, for which he received 150 acres (0.61 km^{2}). In 1624 or 1625, their daughter Elizabeth was born. They also had William, John, Roger, and Memory.

== Time in Virginia ==
Tucker was one of the first subscribers of the Virginia Company. Tucker was an ancient planter with 800 acres (3.2 km^{2}) in Kecoughtan (later Elizabeth City). He traveled to and from England during trading voyages, including in 1618, 1630, 1632, and 1633. Harris stated that "he was a shrewd and hard man of business".

On June 20, 1619, he was elected to represent Kecoughtan for the first General Assembly of Virginia. He was a member of the Colony of Virginia in 1620. In 1623 and 1634, Tucker was a member of the House of Burgesses. Called Captain William Tucker, he was an envoy to the Pamunkey Native Americans for the colony.

In March, 1622, 347 or more colonists were killed during an Indian massacre. Settlements and plantations were set ablaze by the natives. Tucker was a military leader during this period.

Captain Tucker and others were given the responsibility to ensure the safety of people in their appointed areas. Tucker's area included Kecoughtan, Newport News and Elizabeth City. Measures included moving people from outlying areas, ensuring means to protect the settlement, and protecting areas with palisades around settlement.

In May 1623, plans were made with Opechancanough to negotiate peace and the release of the missing women. Opechancanough released Mistress Boyse as a good faith gesture, with the implied message that he would negotiate for the release of the remaining women. Captain Tucker and a group of musketeers met with Opechancanough and members of a Powhatan village along the Potomac River on May 22. In preparation for the event, Dr. John Potts prepared poisoned wine. Captain Tucker and others offered ceremonial toasts and 200 natives died after drinking the wine. Another 50 people were slain by colonists. Opechancanough escaped, but a number of tribal leaders were killed.

Before 1623 and on March 4, 1626, Captain Tucker was appointed to the Governor's Council. He was a member of the Virginia General Assembly in 1625. In September 1632, he became the commission of the peace.

== Indentured servants ==
William held two black indentured servants, Isabell and Anthoney, who were among the first Africans in Virginia, arriving between 1619 and 1624, when their son William Tucker was born. He was the first African American child to be born in the Thirteen Colonies. Captain William Tucker had 17 servants. In 1625, he owned three African slaves. At that time, there was a total of 20 servants or slaves of African descent in the colony.

== Land grants ==
Tucker entered into a land grant with his three of his brothers-in-law, William, Paul and George Thompson. They were part of his “muster” of 1624 to 1625. He was among a group that included William and Maurice Thompson in a joint land grant in 1636.

Tucker died some time before February 17, 1643/4. or in England, likely before 1640. His will was read in London, England.
