= Hampton City Hall =

Historic public building in Virginia, US

- U.S. National Register of Historic Places
- Virginia Landmarks Register
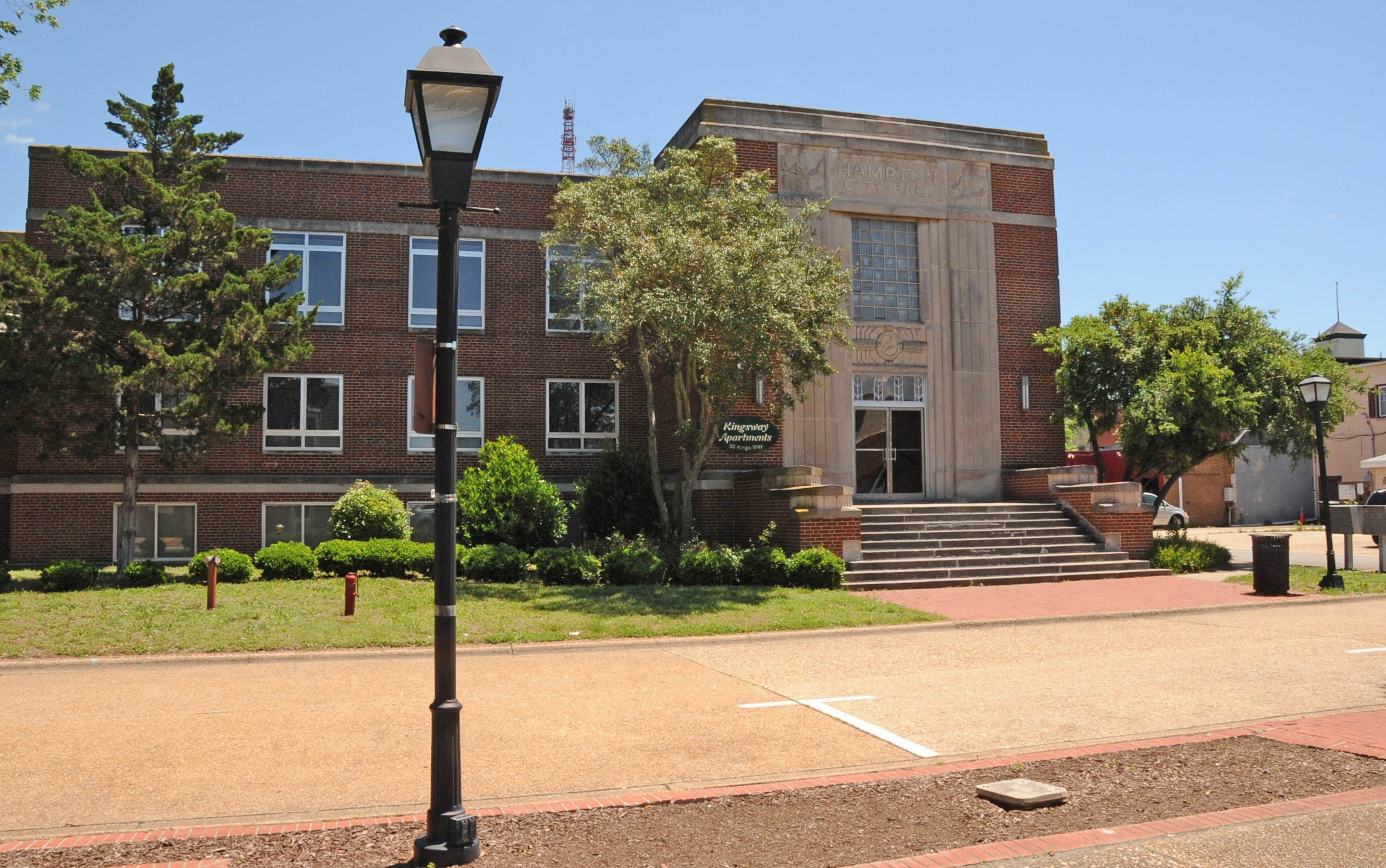

- Location within Virginia Location within the United States
- Location: 100 Kings Way, Hampton, Virginia
- Coordinates: 37°1′34″N 76°20′40″W
- Area: 0.3 acres (0.12 ha)
- Built: 1938-1939
- Built by: Muirhead Construction Co.
- Architect: Williams, Coile & Pipino
- Architectural style: Art Deco
- NRHP reference No.: 07000806
- VLR No.: 114-5142

Significant dates
- Added to NRHP: August 8, 2007
- Designated VLR: June 6, 2007

Hampton City Hall is a historic city hall located at Hampton, Virginia. It was built in 1938–1939, and is a two-story, concrete building clad in brick veneer and topped with a flat roof surrounded by a parapet in the Art Deco style. In 1962, the building was expanded and converted for use as a Juvenile Courts and Probation Office. The entrance façade is marked by stylized fluted columns flanking the double-leaf replacement entrance doors and glass block window. There is a stylized Art Deco motif panel surrounding the City of Hampton seal above the double-leaf doors and decorative transom. Funding for the building's construction was provided by the Public Works Administration (PWA).

It was listed on the National Register of Historic Places in 2007.

The current City Hall is located on Lincoln Street and opened in 1976.
