= John Pott =

Physician General of Virginia and Deputy-Governor in the 1620s

Doctor John Pott Deputy-Governor and Physician-General
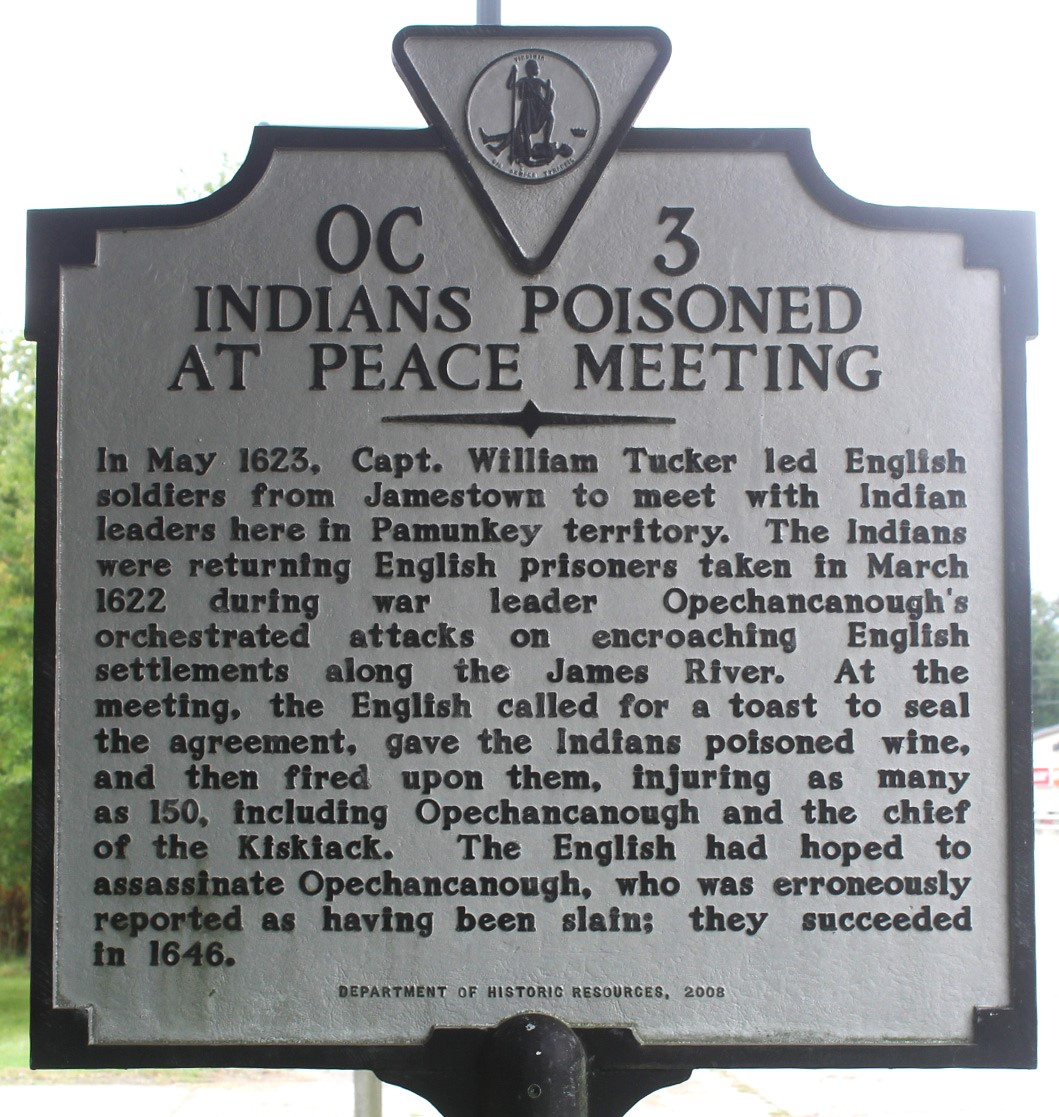
- The 1623 wine incident that involved Pott and William Tucker
- Died: after March 25, 1651
- Other name: John Potts
- Occupation: physician
- Spouse: Elizabeth
- Preceded by: John Harvey
- Succeeded by: John West

Virginia Governor's Council
- In office 1625–1629

5º Crown Governors Virginia
- In office 1629–1630

John Pott (or Potts) was a physician and Colonial Governor of Virginia at the Jamestown settlement in the Virginia Colony in the early 17th century.

== Biography ==
=== Education ===
John Potts is said to have taken his degree of M.A., at Oxford University in 1605.

=== Migration ===
He was recommended as physician to the Virginia Company of London by the eminent Dr. Theodore Gulston, the founder of the Gulstonian Lectureship of the London College of Physicians. In the minutes of the Virginia Company of July 16, 1621, is the following entry:

"For so much as the Phisicons place to the Company was now become voyde by reason of the untimely death of Dr. Bohune, slaine in the fight with two Spanish Shipps of Warr the 19th of March last, Dr. Gulstone did now take occasion to recommend unto the Company for the said place one Mr. Potts, a Master of Arts, well practised in Chirurgerie and Physique, and expert also in distillinge of waters."

Dr. Potts and his wife Elizabeth sailed from London aboard the George in March 1619. The George was a 150-ton sailing vessel with William Ewen as the master. After a two-month passage the vessel arrived in Jamestown, Virginia, in May 1619.

=== Poisoning trial ===
In 1623, Dr. Potts gained notoriety as the individual who prepared the poison served to the Native Americans during a "peace ceremony" at Jamestown, killing 200 of them in retaliation for the Indian massacre of 1622 which killed nearly a third of the colonists the preceding year. However, after thorough investigation, Pott was cleared of the charge and restored to his Council seat. The mystery was never solved. In 1625, he was commissioned a member of the Governor's Council, in which office he continued a number of years. In 1628 he was chosen Governor, and held the position from 1629 until the early part of 1630, when, being accused of stealing cattle, he was superseded by Sir John Harvey. Pott(s) was convicted for cattle theft by the Council on July 9, 1630.

The jury for the trial, however, was totally subservient to the obvious wishes of Sir John Harvey. Pott was found guilty and confined to his plantation, Harrop, the first settlement in the area of what is now Williamsburg, where he learned that his entire estate was to be confiscated. Further sentencing was suspended "until his Majestie's pleasure" be known. Governor Harvey now faced a sensitive political problem. He fervently desired that Pott be dishonored and banished from the colony. The physician, however, had much popular support and, in addition, his skills as a physician were still desperately required by the colony. Pott's wife rose from her sickbed and returned to England to plead her husband's case before the king. Apparently Harvey had little choice but to extricate himself from a difficult political situation as gracefully as possible. The governor therefore appealed to the king to pardon Dr. Pott, "as he was by far the best physician in the colony ... skilled in epidemicals." Pott was subsequently pardoned, his estate was returned, and he resumed his medical practice in the colony.

=== Plantation and estates ===
Dr. Potts had a plantation which he called "Harrop," and which he may have so named in honor of his ancestral home. Harrop in Cheshire, England was the place of residence of some of the Potts at that period. This plantation, patented in 1631, may be related to the Harrop Parish of the Church of England established in James City County in 1644, which years later became part of Bruton Parish.

On July 12, 1632, Dr. Potts obtained a patent for 1,200 acres (4.9 km^{2}) at the head of Archer's Hope Creek. Part of this land was to become a fortified palisade across the peninsula. In February, 1633, it was enacted by the General Assembly that a fortieth part of the men in "the compasse of the forest" east of Archer's Hope and Queen's Creek to Chesapeake Bay (essentially all of the lower peninsula) should be present "before the first day of March next" at Dr. John Potts' plantation, "newlie built," to erect houses and secure the land in that quarter.

With this labor, palisades, six miles (10 km) in length, were run from creek to creek, and, on the ridge between, a settlement to be called Middle Plantation was made. The doctor would have certainly recognized the sanitary advantages of the country around Middle Plantation. As the ridge between the creeks was remarkably well drained, there were few mosquitoes. The deep ravines penetrating from the north and south made the place of much strategic value. Also, the only practical road down the Peninsula was over this ridge, and this road was easily defended. At Middle Plantation, some years later, this road was later to be called Duke of Gloucester Street. The town of Middle Plantation was renamed Williamsburg in 1699.

=== Personal life and death ===
Dr. Potts is believed to have had no children, and apparently died prior to 1651.

Government offices
Preceded by Francis West	Colonial Governor of Virginia; 1628–1629	Succeeded by John Harvey (Virginia governor)
