= Denbigh Baptist Christian School =

Location
- 13010 Mitchell Point road Newport News, Virginia 23602; United States; 37°6′24.3″N 76°30′35.8″W

Information
- Type: Private, Parochial, Christian, Coeducational
- Religious affiliation: Baptist
- Established: 1970
- CEEB code: 471531
- Grades: PreK-12
- Age range: 3-18
- Campus size: 12.8 acres
- Campus type: Suburban
- Colors: Red, White, & Blue
- Athletics conference: Metro Conference of Virginia Independent State Athletic Association(VISAA)
- Mascot: Minutemen
- Nickname: DBCS
- Team name: Minutemen
- Accreditation: Association of Christian Schools International (ACSI)
- Yearbook: The Musket
- Website: http://www.dbcs.org

Denbigh Baptist Christian School is a private Christian school in Newport News, Virginia that provides education to students from preschool through twelfth grade.

== History ==
The school started as an outreach ministry of Denbigh Baptist Church in September 1970 with a class of 15 kindergarteners. By September 1972, it had 150 students from kindergarten to seventh grade. The school graduated its first class of eight seniors in 1980. The school was first accredited by the Association of Christian Schools International in 1997. In 2003 the school had 508 students with 48 in the graduating class.

Head of School
Name	Dates
Robert W Greiner (Administrator)	1977
David Gambrell (Principal)	1982
Mr Coan (Principal)	1985
Dennis F. Chappell (Administrator)	1986 - 2003
Wayne C. Embry (Administrator)	2004 - 2008
Greg Hardy (Administrator)	2008 - 2012
Robert Law (Administrator)	2012 -
