= St. John's Episcopal Church (Hampton, Virginia) =

Historic church in Virginia, US

- U.S. National Register of Historic Places
- Virginia Landmarks Register
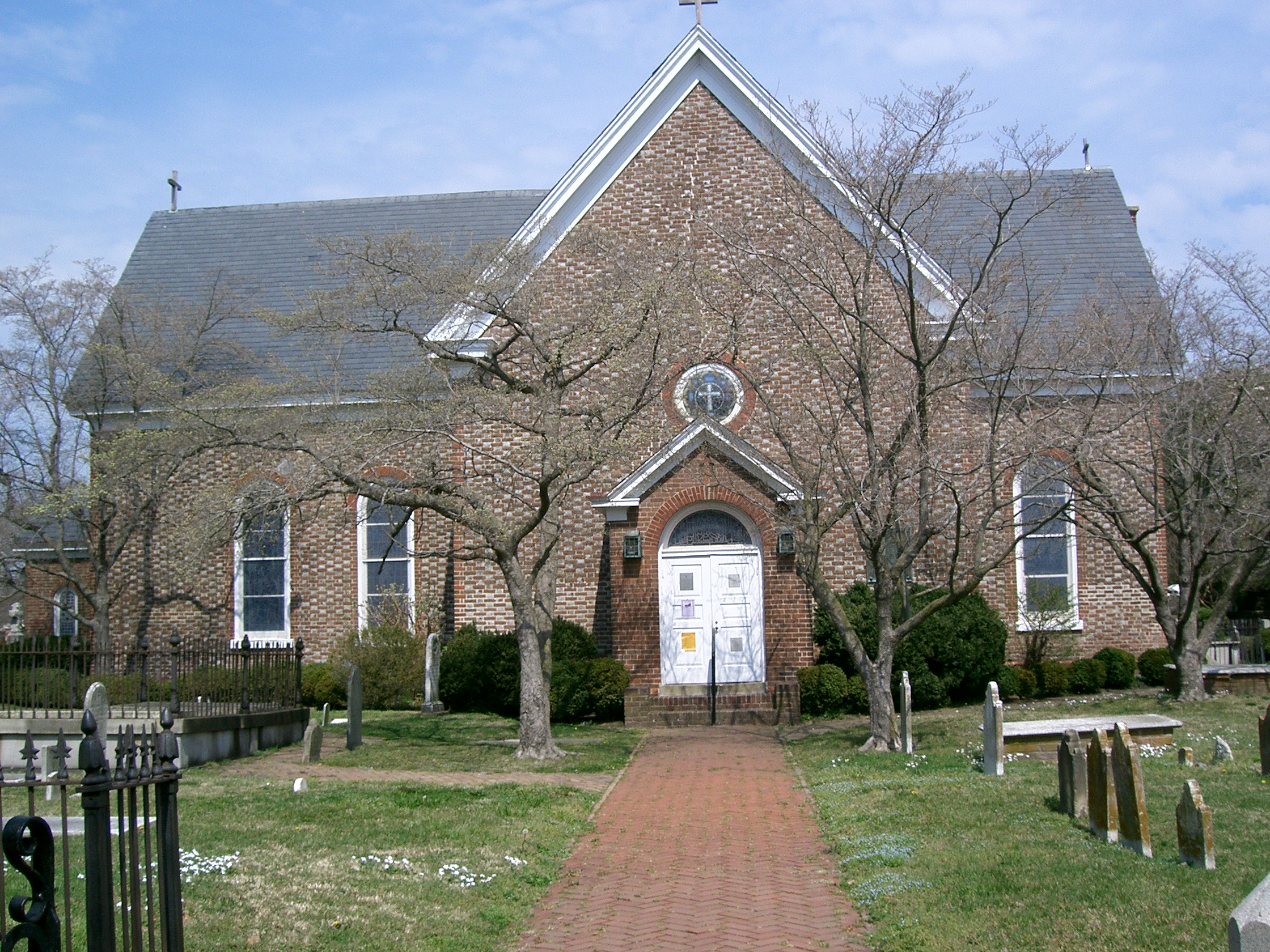
- Looking North at St. John's Episcopal Church

- Location within Virginia Location within the United States
- Location: Northwest corner of W. Queen and Court Sts., Hampton, Virginia
- Coordinates: 37°01′33″N 76°20′49″W
- Area: 9.9 acres (4.0 ha)
- Built: 1728/1610
- Architect: Henry Cary Jr.
- Architectural style: Georgian with Flemish bond brickwork
- NRHP reference No.: 70000871
- VLR No.: 114-0001

Significant dates
- Added to NRHP: February 26, 1970
- Designated VLR: December 2, 1969

St. John's is an Episcopal church located in Hampton, Virginia, United States, within the Episcopal Diocese of Southern Virginia. Established in 1610, St. John's is the oldest English-speaking parish in continuous existence in the United States of America.

== History ==
English settlers from Jamestown established a community and church on the tip of the Virginia Peninsula on July 9, 1610, one month after Lord De La Warr arrived at Jamestown with supplies that effectively ended the Starving Time in that settlement. This new settlement was named after the Algonquian-speaking Kecoughtan who lived in the area.

=== First parish site, 1610–1623 ===
An archaeological excavation at the second parish site at Hampton University has revealed structural post holes below and offset from those above. It was long believed the first church was in the Church Creek area of Hampton near present-day LaSalle and Chesapeake Avenues.

The first minister of the new parish was the Reverend William Mease who was appointed by the Bishop of London to lead the church at Kecoughtan. A historical marker on LaSalle Ave erroneously marks the approximate location of the first site.

The site of the first and second churches can be found at coordinates 37.023637, −76.334946, off Tyler Street East, Hampton University.

=== Second parish site, 1623–1667 ===
In 1619 the settlement was renamed Elizabeth Cittie [sic]. By 1623 the town had re-established itself east of Hampton River, where the second church of “Elizabeth City” parish was built. The site is included within the grounds of what is now Hampton University. Abandoned in 1667 after a third church was built, the foundations of the second church were discovered in 1910. It was a small wooded structure to which a vestibule was added later. Today, the original foundations and some of the brick floor have been excavated and can be seen at the second site, along with information, conjectural paintings, and a historical marker. Artifacts found during the excavation are on display in the St. John's Parish House museum.

=== Third parish site, 1667–1728 ===
The third building of the parish was constructed more than a mile to the west of the second church at "Westwoods Town Quarter", indicating that there was growth of the town on the west side of Hampton River. Like the previous structure, it was made of wood and was of similar size. This building continued in use for about 60 years. The site is located off West Pembroke Avenue east of LaSalle Avenue and features a historical marker, building foundations outlined by bricks, several 17th and 18th-century gravestones, and a protective brick wall.

=== Fourth parish site, 1728–present ===
In the early 18th century, activity centered about the busy port which has become downtown Hampton. The parishioners petitioned the Governor for permission to relocate their place of worship closer to the population center. It was granted, and construction of the fourth church on one and one half acres on the outskirts of Hampton began. Henry Cary Jr. of Williamsburg completed the present cruciform building in 1728. A belfry was added to the west front in 1762. The building was damaged in the Revolutionary War, the War of 1812, and (most extensively) the Civil War. It took the parish several decades to complete repair the church after the War of 1812.

After full restoration, on Saturday, March 6, 1830, Bishop Richard Channing Moore, Bishop of Virginia, consecrated the church with its new name St. John's. The building was damaged again during the Civil War on August 7, 1861. In an attempt to keep the town from Union occupation, Confederate soldiers set fire to homes, businesses and the church. The great bell was destroyed, and only the blackened walls remained by the time Union soldiers occupied the town and camped in the churchyard. As a result of the fire, St. John's is the only surviving colonial structure in downtown Hampton. At war's end, contributions due to a widespread appeal to rebuild the church were used. Restoration was finished around 1869/1870. Although the exterior's colonial appearance was restored (except for the belfry), the interior reflects the late 19th-century Victorian influence. Early in the 20th century, the rear tower was added, the west gallery was built in 1957, the chapel completed in 1985, and the current manual tracker organ installed in 1993.

== Points of interest ==
The 1618 Communion silver used today have the longest history of continuous use in America of any English church silver. The pieces were brought from England in 1619 and used in a church founded in 1618 located in Smith's Hundred in Virginia, which lay in the point between the Chickahominy and the James Rivers, eight miles northwest of Jamestown. The church was nearly destroyed in the Indian Massacre of March 22, 1622(NS). The silver was carried by Governor George Yeardley to Jamestown and afterward, approximately 1628, given to the second Elizabeth City Church, which had just been built. St. John's continues to use communion silver on special occasions. The chalice has inscribed the London date-letter for 1618–1619 and the text "THE COMMVNION CVPP FOR S^{NT} MARYS CHVRCH IN SMITHS HVNDRED IN VIRGINIA". There are two patens with the same London date-letter. The first paten has the inscription "Whosoever shall eate this bread and drinke the cupp of the Lord/unworthily shalbe gilty of the body & blood of y^{e} Lord Cor Ixi^{th}". The second paten has written: "If any man eate of this Bread he shall live for ever Jo VI^{th}".

In 1887 the Native American students from the Hampton Normal and Agricultural Institute (now Hampton University) contributed to a stained glass window depicting the baptism of Pocahontas.

On the chapel wall to the left of the main altar is an aumbry. The door panel consists of pieces of the 13th-century stained glass from St. Helena Church, Willoughby, Lincolnshire, United Kingdom – the parish in which Captain John Smith was baptized. The panel was presented to the St. John's Parish by the rector of Willoughby St. Helena on Sunday, July 14,1985, as part of St. John's 375th anniversary celebration.

== Mission Churches of St. John's ==
St. John's established a number of missions, each of which eventually became parish churches.

=== St. Paul's Episcopal Church (Newport News, VA) ===
Established 1894 in Newport News, to support the families and workers (both local and visiting) in maritime construction and transportation industries. On July 20, 2019, the church building was secularized (deconsecrated).

=== Emmanuel Episcopal Church (Hampton, VA) ===
Established April 11, 1897 in to support the growing community of Phoebus (Hampton).

=== St. Cyprian's Episcopal Church (Hampton, VA) ===
Established 1905 in Hampton, VA, as the first all-black Episcopal church supporting Hampton and Phoebus, Hampton University students, and Newport News.

=== Grace Episcopal Church, (Newport News, VA) ===
Established 1942 in Newport News. This congregation left the US Episcopal Church to join the Anglican Mission in the Americas as River's Cross Anglican Church in 2004. River's Cross, too, possibly disbanded in late 2014 when the property they and the LivingStone Monastery rented had to be vacated. As of October 2014, River's Stone was meeting in an undisclosed home. Their website and Facebook page have since become unavailable.

=== St. Mark's Episcopal Church (Hampton, VA) ===
Established 1963 as a mission of St. John's, Hampton, to serve the growing population of northwestern Hampton. On July 25, 2019, the church building was secularized (deconsecrated). St. Mark's congregation will continue to meet at St. John's Episcopal Church, Hampton.

== Notes ==
- All dates up to 1752 are Old Style dates unless postfixed with "(NS-New Style)". For example, dates like 1723 and 1724(NS) may be interpreted 1723/1724.
