= Roy F. Brissenden =

American physicist (1919–1999)

Roy Frampton Brissenden (19 April 1919 – 13 March 1999) was a NASA physicist, engineer, teacher and inventor whose pioneering and imaginative work made possible the advancement and accomplishments of the Mercury, Gemini, Apollo, and Space Shuttle programs.

== Early life ==
Roy Frampton Brissenden was born, 19 April 1919, to Henry Frampton and Elsie Ball Brissenden in Winston-Salem, North Carolina, where he received his public education and began his early careers. The eldest of three sons (James and Edward), Roy showed keen interest in aviation from an early age. His parents were persons of strong moral fibre, with solid work ethics and an entrepreneurial bent. These traits, paired with his natural inquisitiveness, became manifest in a character that would eventually produce astonishing results.

From age 11, Roy began working in the family business, founded by his father, and acquired a firm grounding in industry, craftmanship and marketing. In 1936, he graduated from R. J. Reynolds High School in Winston-Salem. From 1938 until 1943, while continuing in the family business, he was also employed by Piedmont Publishing, contracting as a distribution manager for the Winston-Salem Journal & Sentinel.

== World War II ==
During World War II, Roy embarked upon a career which was to prove critical to his life's work. In 1943, he enlisted in the United States Army Air Forces as a pilot and flight instructor. An ace pilot, himself, 2nd Lieutenant Brissenden flew P38s, P47s and P51s; and trained cadets in instrument flying in AT6s. Upon his discharge in 1945, Roy joined the Air Force Reserve, and returned to the Winston-Salem Journal & Sentinel, and the family business.

== Post-war academic career ==
After the War, Roy conducted energetic independent study into physics and avionics. In 1951, he entered North Carolina State College at Raleigh to further pursue his dream, earning his baccalaureate degree in Mechanical and Aeronautical Engineering in 1955. He was discharged from the Air Force Reserve the same year. Roy would eventually attend Virginia Polytechnic Institute in Blacksburg, Virginia, in the midst of his NASA career, to acquire his master's degree in the same discipline.

== Hampton, Virginia and NACA / NASA Langley ==
In 1955, Roy chose to relocate to Hampton, Virginia, having been recruited to join the professional staff of the National Advisory Committee for Aeronautics (NACA) at Langley Research Center, later to become National Aeronautics and Space Administration (NASA). His concentration while at NACA/NASA was in the design, construction and training for Rendezvous and Docking Programs. He, alone, designed the Docking Simulator and supervised its construction; employing the expediency and physical means which saved the government several millions of dollars. In the Simulator, Roy personally trained all the Apollo Mission astronauts for lunar orbital flight and landings. The Docking Simulator was his major professional accomplishment. A massive work of engineering artistry and detail, it has been designated as a National Monument, and hangs in perpetual display in the NASA Hangar, Building #1244. During his tenure, Roy was the author or co-author of more than 40 published professional papers. For the design of aeronautic and general scientific equipment and devices, he was the awardee or co-awardee of numerous U.S. patents and of Presidential Citations.

== Death ==
Brissenden died on March 13, 1999, in Hampton, Virginia.
