= Langley Federal Credit Union =

American financial services cooperative

- Type: Credit union
- Industry: Financial services
- Founded: 1936; 90 years ago
- Headquarters: Newport News, Virginia, United States
- Number of locations: 21
- Area served: Employees and/or members of approximately 1,000 employers and associations located in the Hampton Roads region.
- Key people: Gaurav Bhatia (President/CEO); Ted Henifin (Chairman)
- Products: Savings; checking; consumer loans; credit cards; mortgages; investments
- Subsidiaries: Langley Financial Services
- Website: www.langleyfcu.org

Langley Federal Credit Union (Langley FCU) is an American credit union headquartered in Newport News, Virginia, chartered and regulated under the authority of the National Credit Union Administration (NCUA). As of 2014, Langley FCU was one of the 100 largest credit unions in the United States.

As of 2022, Langley FCU had US$5.1 billion in assets and over 351,000 members. The credit union has 21 branches in the Hampton Roads area of Virginia.

== History ==
Langley Federal Credit Union was chartered on April 17, 1936, by twenty-five National Advisory Committee for Aeronautics (now known as NASA) employees who each deposited $1 to pay the charter fee. In 1942, the credit union changed its name to Langley Memorial Aeronautical Laboratory Federal Credit Union.

The next year, Air Force civilian personnel were admitted for membership and the credit union joined the Virginia Credit Union League. October 1956, the credit union officially changed its name to Langley Federal Credit Union and Air Force military personnel were allowed to the field of membership. Langley Federal Credit Union has served the entire Hampton Roads community since 1936. Today membership at Langley FCU is available to employees and/or members of approximately 1,000 employers and associations located in the Hampton Roads region.

== Services ==
Langley FCU offers the typical types of financial services offered by most financial institutions, including savings, checking, IRA accounts, certificates of deposit, consumer loans, credit cards, mortgages, home equity lines of credit, investment services, and insurance services. Langley FCU also offers products and services for small businesses.

As of November 2022, Langley FCU has 21 branches and offered online services via its corporate website, Langleyfcu.org. In addition, members can make ATM transactions through a network of approximately 55,000 surcharge-free ATMs in the Allpoint network.

== Community involvement ==
Langley FCU partners with a number of charitable organizations. Organizations must be a registered 501(c)(3) and serve a community in which Langley FCU has a physical location or large concentration of members.

Langley FCU incorporated the Langley for Families Foundation in December 2014. The foundation is a non-profit 501(c)(3) public charity that provides support for children and families in Hampton Roads, Virginia. The areas of focus are healthcare, housing and human services, safety and security and financial education. Organizations that have benefited from Langley for Families Foundation include The Foodbank, The Boys & Girls Clubs, Peninsula Agency on Aging, EDMARC, Hospice House and Support Care of Williamsburg, LINK of Hampton Roads and March of Dimes.
