= Bluebird Gap Farm =

- The livestock barn at the farm
- Interactive map of Bluebird Gap Farm
- 37.0337°N 76.3877°W
- Date opened: 1966
- Location: Hampton, Virginia, United States
- Land area: 60 acres (24 ha)
- No. of animals: 250
- No. of species: 25
- Website: www.hampton.gov/bbgf

Bluebird Gap Farm is a public city park and petting zoo located in Hampton, Virginia, at 60 Pine Chapel Road. It is designed to resemble a working farm, and features farm animals and fowl of all types, and wild animals native to Virginia.

It is also home to the city's volunteer master gardeners' demonstration garden.

== History ==
Opening in 1966 under the name Old MacDonald's Farm, it is one of the city's oldest parks. It was then home to 105 donated and "loaned" domestic animals. Originally located on the site of the nearby Hampton Coliseum, the Farm moved to its current location on Pine Chapel Road in 1969, and sought to show animals in a farm setting to children from a city environment.

== Events ==
Each year in late October the park hosts a Fall Festival, a two-day fall themed event with vendors, games, food, and a pumpkin patch. Starting in 2010, the Bluebird Gap Farm sponsors a 4-H Club for youths 5–18 years old.
