= Victoria Boulevard Historic District =

National historic district in Hampton, Virginia

- Historic Little England
- U.S. National Register of Historic Places
- U.S. Historic district
- Virginia Landmarks Register
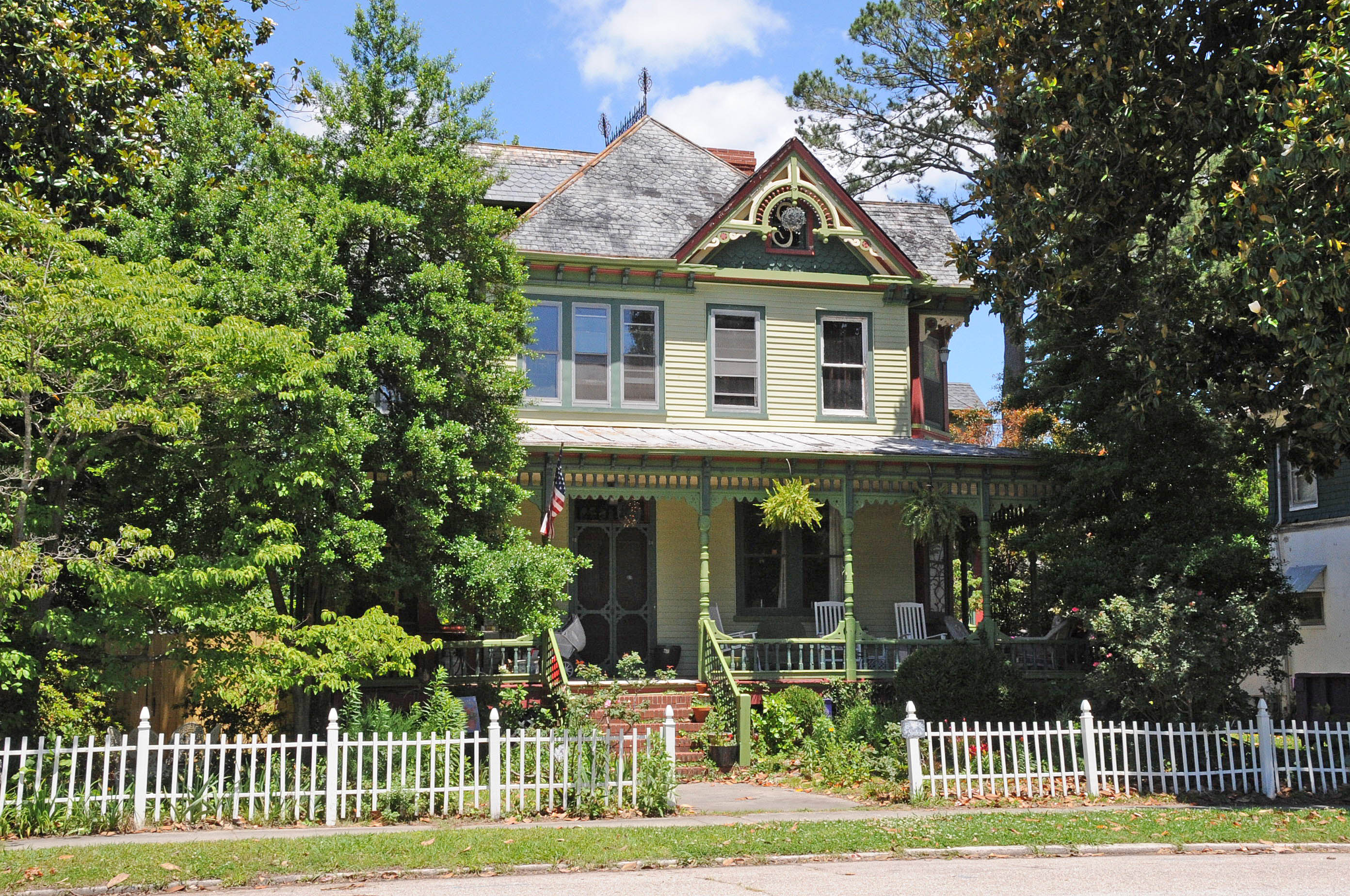
- The Original J.S. Darling House.

- Location within Virginia Location within the United States
- Location: Roughly bounded by Sunset Creek, Armisted and Linden Aves., and Bridge St., Hampton, Virginia
- Coordinates: 37°01′09″N 76°20′53″W
- Area: 38 acres (15 ha)
- Built: 1888
- Architect: Multiple
- Architectural style: Colonial Revival, Queen Anne, American Foursquare
- NRHP reference No.: 84000039
- VLR No.: 114-0112

Significant dates
- Added to NRHP: October 4, 1984
- Designated VLR: August 21, 1984

Historic Little England (previously known as the Victoria Boulevard Historic District) is a national historic district located at Hampton, Virginia. The district encompasses 87 contributing buildings in a streetcar suburb originally laid out in 1888. The primarily residential district includes notable examples of the Queen Anne and Colonial Revival styles. Notable dwellings include the house of developer Frank Darling (c. 1895), Reed House (c. 1902), and the James Darling II residence (1927).

It was listed on the National Register of Historic Places in 1984.

== Historical significance ==
The Historic Little England area (originally known as 'Darling's Little England') is an excellent example of a turn-of-the-century streetcar suburb on Virginia's Peninsula. Originally laid out in 1888 by local entrepreneur James S. Darling as a complement to his newly constructed electric railway, the area's first house was erected prior to 1895 and the development was virtually complete by the second decade of this century. Since the houses in the area were constructed in consecutively popular modes (i.e. Queen Anne, Colonial Revival, and American Foursquare) during an era of aggressive eclecticism, the district's architectural cohesiveness is established through use of common building materials, similarity of scale among structures, and mutually sympathetic exterior color schemes. In all probability three of the structures are products of the students of the Hampton Institute Trade School. These dwellings are a testament to early 20th-century efforts to improve the social and economic status of Blacks and Native Americans by means of a liberal education and training in the manual arts. The neighborhood is often associated with its progenitor, James S. Darling, who in 1886 purchased several parcels of land that were once part of the 18th-century plantation known as Little England. In 1888 the land was subdivided and offered for sale. No immediate development occurred for as yet unknown reasons.

== James S. Darling ==
James S. Darling was an entrepreneur from New York who fortuitously arrived in Hampton in 1866 with a schooner carrying a cargo of lumber. Hampton had been virtually destroyed by the Civil War and Darling offered his services and lumber for house building. In such a market success came quite easily to Darling and he soon built his own lumber yard and grist mill. By 1879 he also owned a menhaden fish oil factory. A storm subsequently destroyed his factory and forced him into near-bankruptcy and another field of endeavor: the oyster business. By 1884 Darling was one of the largest oyster merchants in the United States. With 350 acres of oysters under cultivation, Darling was the founder of the wholesale oyster industry in Hampton.

In 1887 Darling founded the first electric streetcar railway on the Peninsula, connecting Hampton with Newport News. In addition he owned a hotel at the local resort of Buckroe Beach. Then, in 1898 this successful local entrepreneur retired to his house on Victoria Boulevard, where he died in 1900. Following Darling's platting of the Darling's Little England area, little immediate development occurred. However, steady development over the next thirty years allowed the neighborhood to mature in a rather interesting manner for that development demonstrates the progression of upper middle class architectural tastes through the first third of this century. It also clarifies the compatibility of the various popular styles.

== Founding ==
Darling purchased the Little England property at about the same time his electric railway was being developed. Victoria Boulevard was located adjacent to the railway at a critical point where the track turned west to Newport News. Therefore, this subdivision became a perfectly situated suburb for businessmen who either worked in Hampton, a short distance to the north, or worked in Newport News and preferred to take advantage of the relatively low land prices of Hampton as a site for their homes. Census data, land tax records, and city directories indicate that this area was generally inhabited by professionals, successful merchants, ship pilots, and trawler owners, as well as the occasional capitalist.

According to city directories, Frank Darling, a member of his father's oyster firm, president of the streetcar company, vice-president of the Hampton Bank, trustee of the Hampton Institute, founder of the Hampton Fire Department and Dixie Hospital, was the first resident in the area, building his house at 4403 Victoria Boulevard around 1895. By 1900 his neighbors included another capitalist, (Keaton at 4410), a lawyer (Woodward at 4501), a druggist (Young at 4607). Hampton's only photographer (Cheyne at 4411), a furniture store owner (Brittingham at 4509), a plumbing supply owner (Copeland at 4400), and Frank Darling's mother at 4405.

== Architecture ==
On Columbia Avenue there were also six houses, occupied by people of similar social status. Most of these houses were designed in the Queen Anne mode, Park Place remained undeveloped until 1907, and on Linden Avenue there were four houses. When the Pressey House was built (1907), the Queen Anne Revival was the most common generic term in the United States to describe the eclectic houses that incorporated any or all of an assortment of materials and details which supposedly characterized a distinct historical style. Despite extensive pronouncements on the origins of the Queen Anne mode none of the discussion propounded a precise definition of the style. It became a matter of symbolic reference and inference, romantic inspiration, and individualized interpretation, rather than prescribed rules. Typically, Queen Anne facades featured elegant combinations of weatherboard, shingles, half-timbering, large areas of casement windows and chimneys laid in decorative patterns. The goal in the design of the Queen Anne house appeared to be historical reminiscences and not references to specific buildings, as an expression of middle class financial comfort.

In 1900, at the death of her husband, Mary Darling gave her son Frank the land at Cedar Point as well as sufficient funds to construct a large house known as Cedar Hall. This large Queen Anne mansion existed on Cedar Point until 1975. The land it once occupied has recently been developed and is now occupied by three large split-level, ranch-style homes which have been excluded from the district. Development of Victoria Boulevard continued at an even pace for the next decade, leaving twenty houses on Victoria Boulevard, ten houses on Linden Avenue, and eleven on Columbia Street and Park Place by 1910. Although most of the residents were affluent, a few of the new houses erected were built as rental property and were occupied by lower income families.

Most of the later houses of larger dimensions constructed in the area were designed in the Colonial Revival style and reflected the new taste for simpler homes as well as evoking images of Virginia's glorious colonial past. This turn toward simplicity was expounded by many of the early 20th-century popular magazines which extolled the virtues of the plainer house. The Queen Anne was discredited as a commercial efflorescence. Furthermore, -the numerous odd-shaped houses were hard to clean and consequently safe havens for deadly bacteria. The simpler Colonial Revival adopted by most of the later residents of this area would seem to reflect the aforementioned popular set of values. In addition popular works such as Joy Wheeler Dow's American Renaissance (1904) provided models for the proper design of such structures. This revivalist style has never really disappeared from the Virginia landscape and several late 20th-century Colonial Revival structures in the district sympathetically reflect the earlier popularity of such a style. Of note also is the Georgian Revival variant of this mode, an example of which is 11 Cedar Point, built in 1927 by Frank Darling for his son J.S. Darling, 11. Its details reach a level of refinement that is rarely seen in this state for this style.

The majority of the dwellings built on Victoria Boulevard after 1910 were smaller American Foursquares. The same reductionist egalitarian and democratic spirit that spawned interest in the Colonial as a style for homes of those of comfortable means generated the style that is now known as the American Foursquare. This was a mode aimed at the general benefit of the masses; a straightforward, plain, yet dignified style characterized by simple rectilinear outlines and using only one or two materials for the facades. The surprising degree of architectural homogeneity that is achieved in this district is, to a large extent, attributable to this style's compatibility with both the Colonial Revival and the Queen Anne styles.

Three of the American Foursquares on Victoria Boulevard can be safely attributed to the hands of students of the Hampton Institute Trade School (4404, 4406, 4612). This important component of the institute was the vehicle by which Major Armstrong sought to provide social betterment for Blacks and Native Americans through their instruction in the manual arts, giving them the necessary skills to ply a trade. In addition, Armstrong advocated manual training as an adjunct to education in the liberal arts. Local legend has attributed several buildings, all American Foursquare in style, to the hand of the Institute students. Subsequent archival investigation has shown that 4612, the residence of Robert Sugden, a manual arts instructor at Hampton Institute, was in fact built by Institute students ca. 1914–15. The annual report of the Institute for that year also makes reference to two other dwellings erected by Institute students. Stylistic similarities and Darling family connections to the Institute point to the strong possibility that 4404 and 4406, both constructed on Darling Property ca. 1915, were built by Hampton Institute students.
