= Hampton, Virginia =

- Independent city
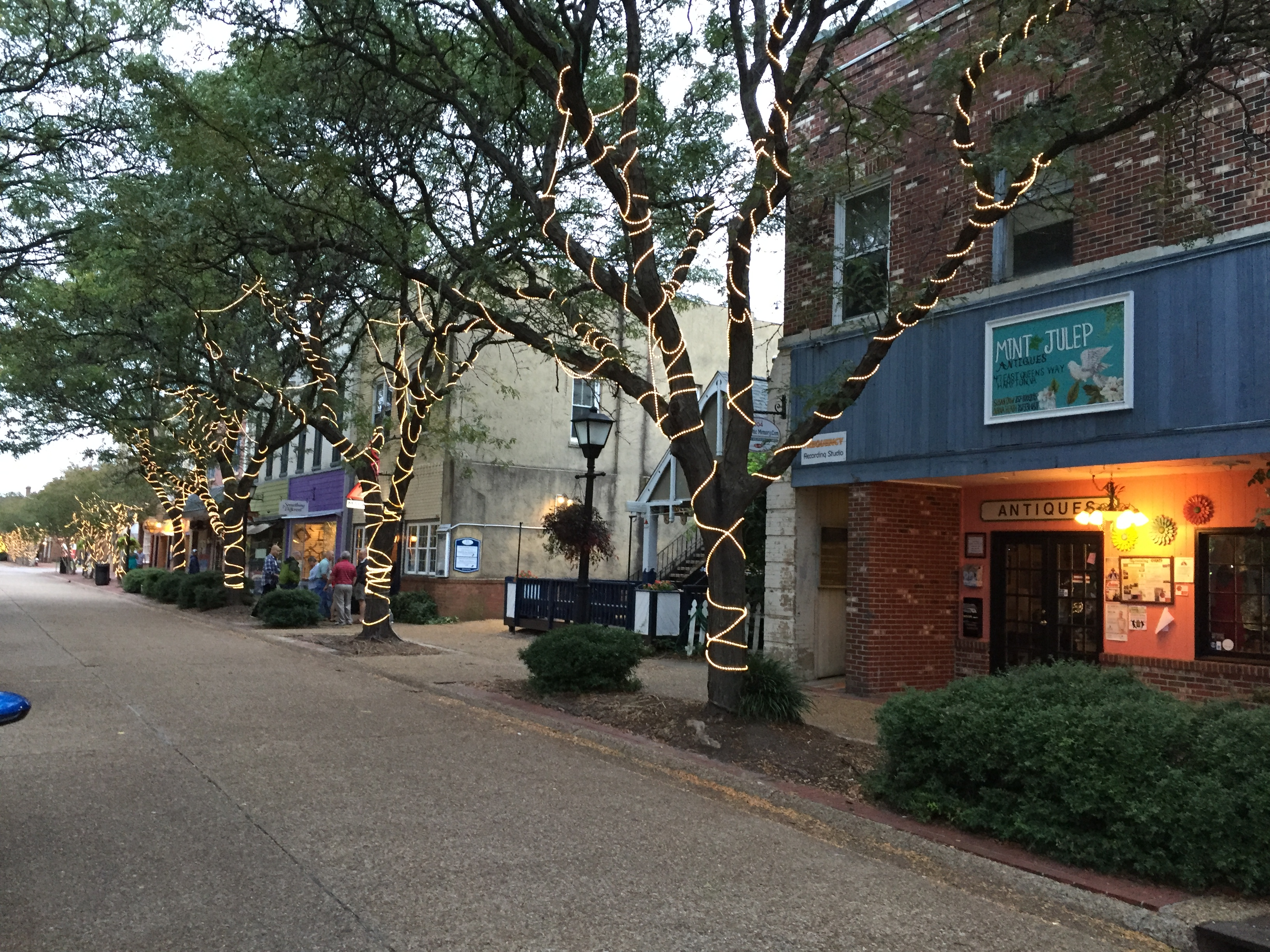
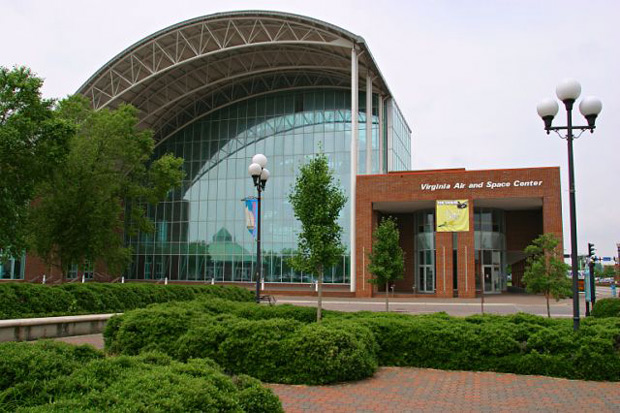
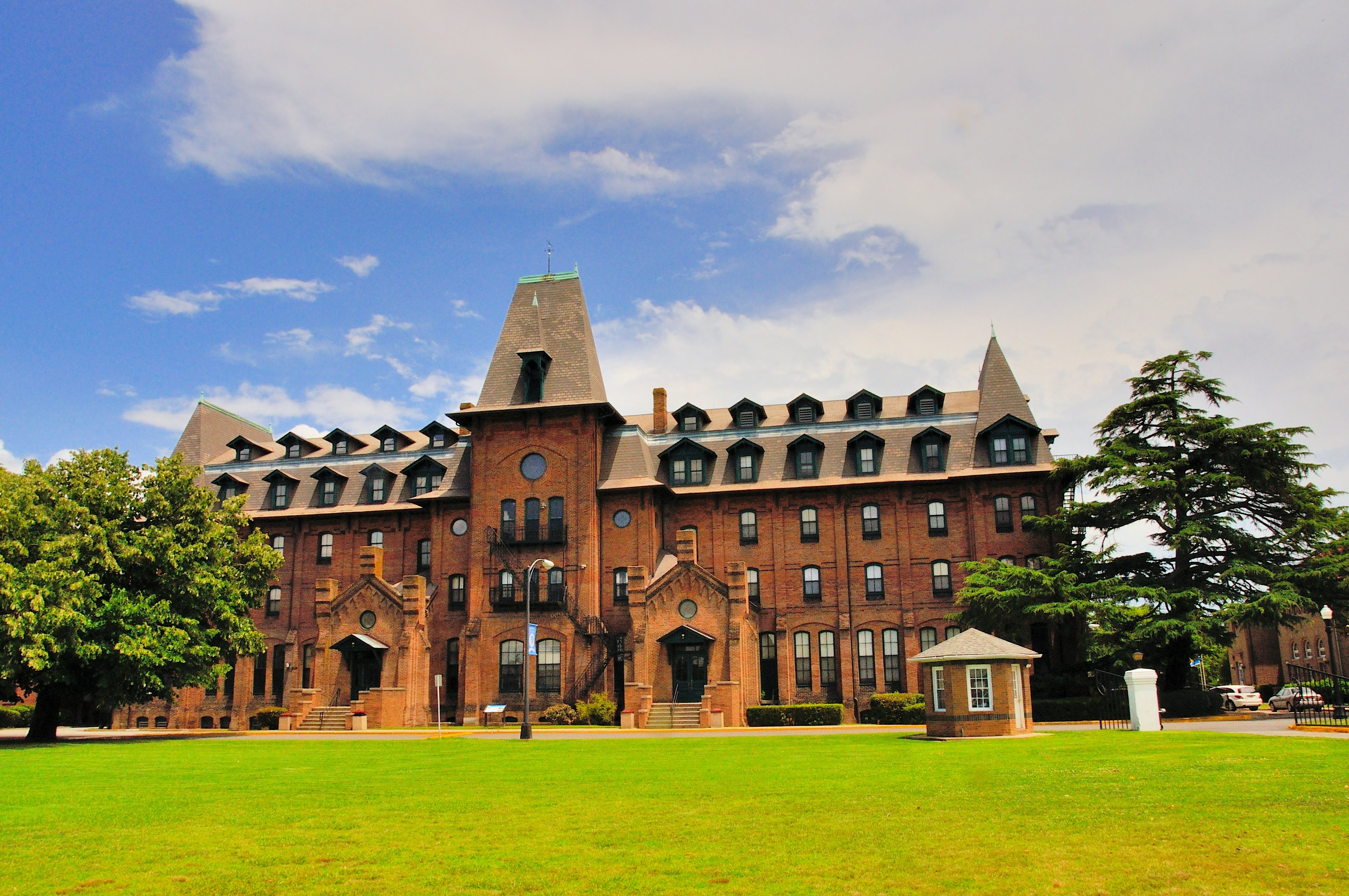
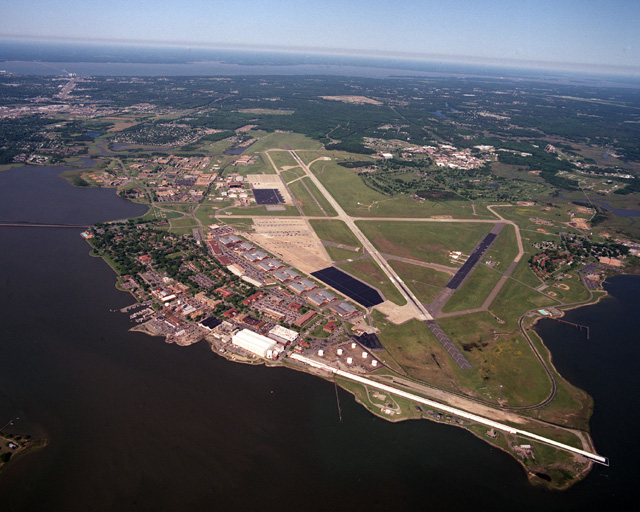
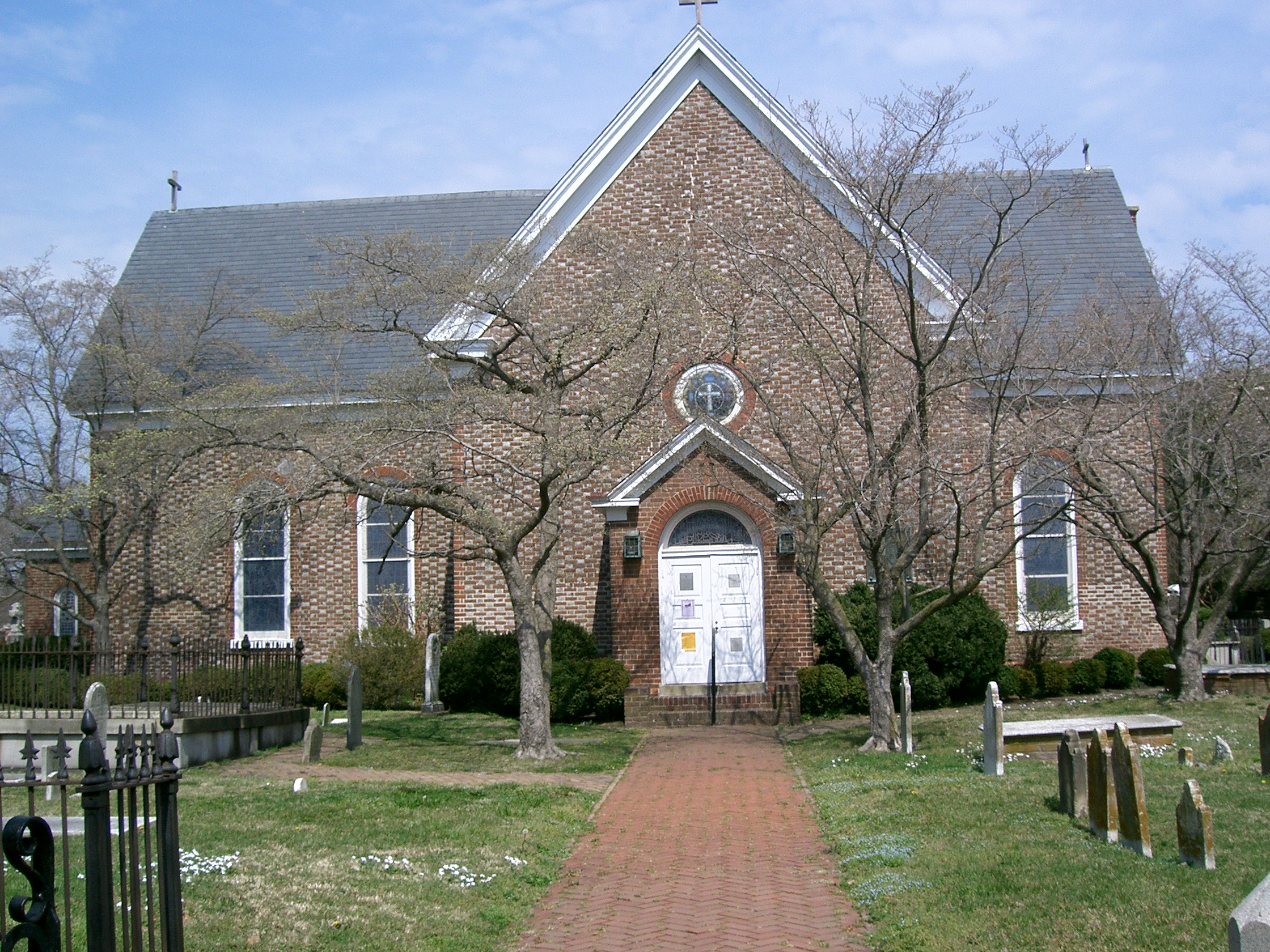
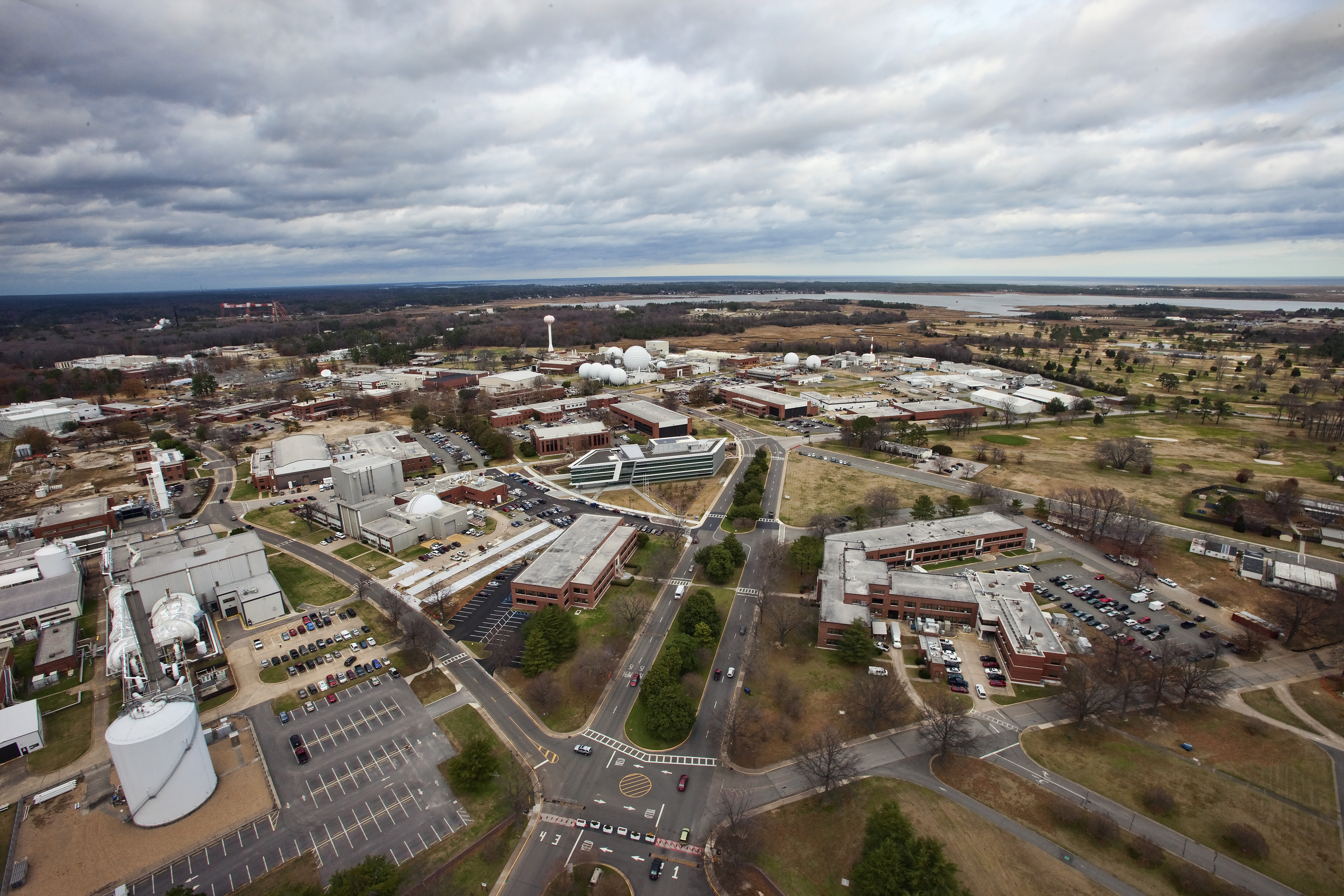
- Hampton Downtown Historic District Virginia Air and Space Science Center Hampton University Hampton Coliseum Langley Air Force Base St. John's Church Langley Research Center

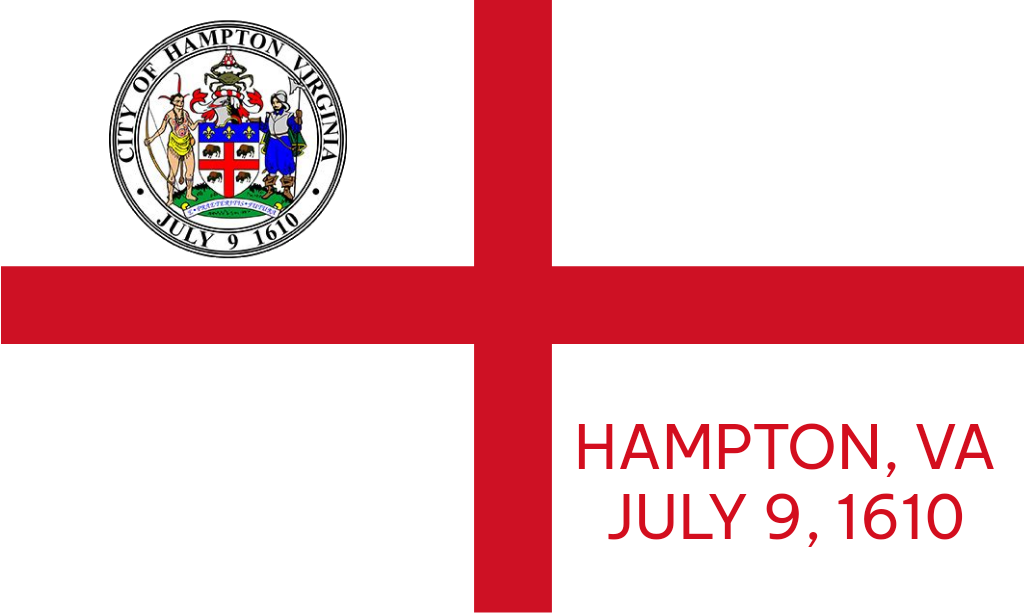
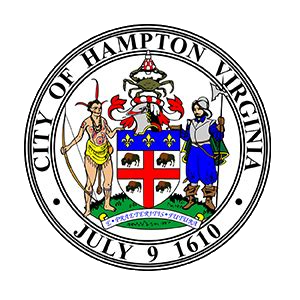
- Flag Seal
- Motto: From the Sea to the Stars
- Location of Hampton in Virginia

- Location within Virginia Location within the United States
- Coordinates: 37°01′35″N 76°20′40″W
- Country: United States
- State: Virginia
- County: None (Independent city)
- Settled: 1610
- Incorporated (town): 1705
- Incorporated (city): 1849

Government
  - Type: Mayor–council–manager
  - Mayor: Jimmy Gray (D)
  - Vice mayor: Steven L. Brown (D)

Area
  - Independent city: 136.27 sq mi (352.95 km^{2})
  - Land: 51.46 sq mi (133.29 km^{2})
  - Water: 84.81 sq mi (219.66 km^{2}) 62.2%
- Elevation: 10 ft (3.0 m)

Population (2020)
  - Independent city: 137,148
  - Estimate (2025): 137,315 ▲
  - Rank: 200th in the United States; 7th in Virginia
  - Density: 2,665.14/sq mi (1,029.02/km^{2})
  - Metro: 1,799,674
- Time zone: UTC−5 (EST)
  - Summer (DST): UTC−4 (EDT)
- ZIP Codes: 23661, 23663-23669
- Area codes: 757, 948
- FIPS code: 51-35000
- GNIS feature ID: 1495650
- Public transportation: Hampton Roads Transit
- Website: www.hampton.gov

Hampton (Note: /ˈhæmptən/) is an independent city in Virginia, United States. The population was 137,148 at the 2020 census, making it the seventh-most populous city in Virginia. Hampton is included in the Hampton Roads metropolitan area (sometimes called "Tidewater"), which has more than 1.8 million inhabitants and is the 37th-largest metropolitan area in the U.S.

Hampton traces its origins to Old Point Comfort, the site of Fort Monroe, named by English explorers led by Christopher Newport in 1607 during the founding of Jamestown. Following the American Civil War, Hampton University was established on the opposite bank of the Hampton River to educate newly freed African Americans and local Native Americans. In the 20th century, the city became home to Langley Air Force Base, NASA's Langley Research Center, and the Virginia Air and Space Science Center.

Since consolidation by a mutual agreement in 1952, Hampton has included the former Elizabeth City County and the incorporated town of Phoebus. The city features a wide array of business and industrial enterprises, retail and residential areas, historical sites, and other points of interest, such as a NASCAR short track, the oldest Anglican parish in the Americas (1610), and a moated, six-sided, historical bastion fort. Hampton is also known for its extensive waterfront and beaches.

== History ==
Indigenous people settled in present-day Hampton before 10,000 BCE. In the early 1600s, the Tidewater region was populated by the Algonquian peoples who called the lands Tsenacommacah. The Powhatan Confederacy was made up of over 30 tribes numbering an estimated 25,000 people before the arrival of English colonists.

=== Colonial history ===
In December 1606, three ships carrying men and boys left England on a mission sponsored by a proprietary company. Led by Captain Christopher Newport, they sailed across the Atlantic Ocean to North America. After a long voyage, they first landed at the entrance to the Chesapeake Bay on the south shore at a place they named Cape Henry (for Henry Frederick, Prince of Wales, the elder son of their king).

During the first few days of exploration, they identified the site of Old Point Comfort (which they originally named "Point Comfort") as a strategic defensive location at the entrance to the body of water that became known as Hampton Roads. This is formed by the confluence of the Elizabeth, Nansemond, and James rivers. The latter is the longest river in Virginia.

Weeks later, on May 14, 1607, they established the first permanent English settlement in the present-day United States at Jamestown, Virginia, about 25 miles (40 km) further inland from the Bay, which became the site of fortifications during the following 200 years.

Slightly south, near the entrance to Hampton River, the colonists seized the Native American community of Kecoughtan under Virginia's Governor, Sir Thomas Gates. The colonists established their own small town, with a small Anglican church (known now as St. John's Episcopal Church), on July 9, 1610. This came to be known as part of Hampton. (With Jamestown having been abandoned in 1699, Hampton claims to be the oldest continuously occupied English settlement in the United States.) Hampton was named for Henry Wriothesley, 3rd Earl of Southampton, an important leader of the Virginia Company of London, for whom the Hampton River, Hampton Roads and Southampton County were also named. The area became part of Elizabeth Cittie [sic] in 1619, Elizabeth River Shire in 1634, and was included in Elizabeth City County when it was formed in 1643. By 1680, the settlement was known as Hampton, and it was incorporated as a town in 1705 and became the seat of Elizabeth City County.

In the latter part of August 1619, the White Lion, a privateer captained by John Colyn Jope and sailing under a Dutch letter of marque, delivered approximately 20 enslaved Africans, from the present-day region of Angola to Point Comfort. They had been removed by its crew from a Portuguese slave ship, the "São João Bautista". These were the first recorded slaves from Africa in the Thirteen Colonies. John Rolfe, the widower of Pocahontas, wrote in a letter that he was at Point Comfort and witnessed the arrival of the first Africans. The Bantu from Angola were considered indentured servants, but in effect, were to be slaves. Two of the first Africans to arrive were Anthony and Isabella. Their child, the first of African descent born in North America, was born baptized January 1624.

=== Post-colonial history ===
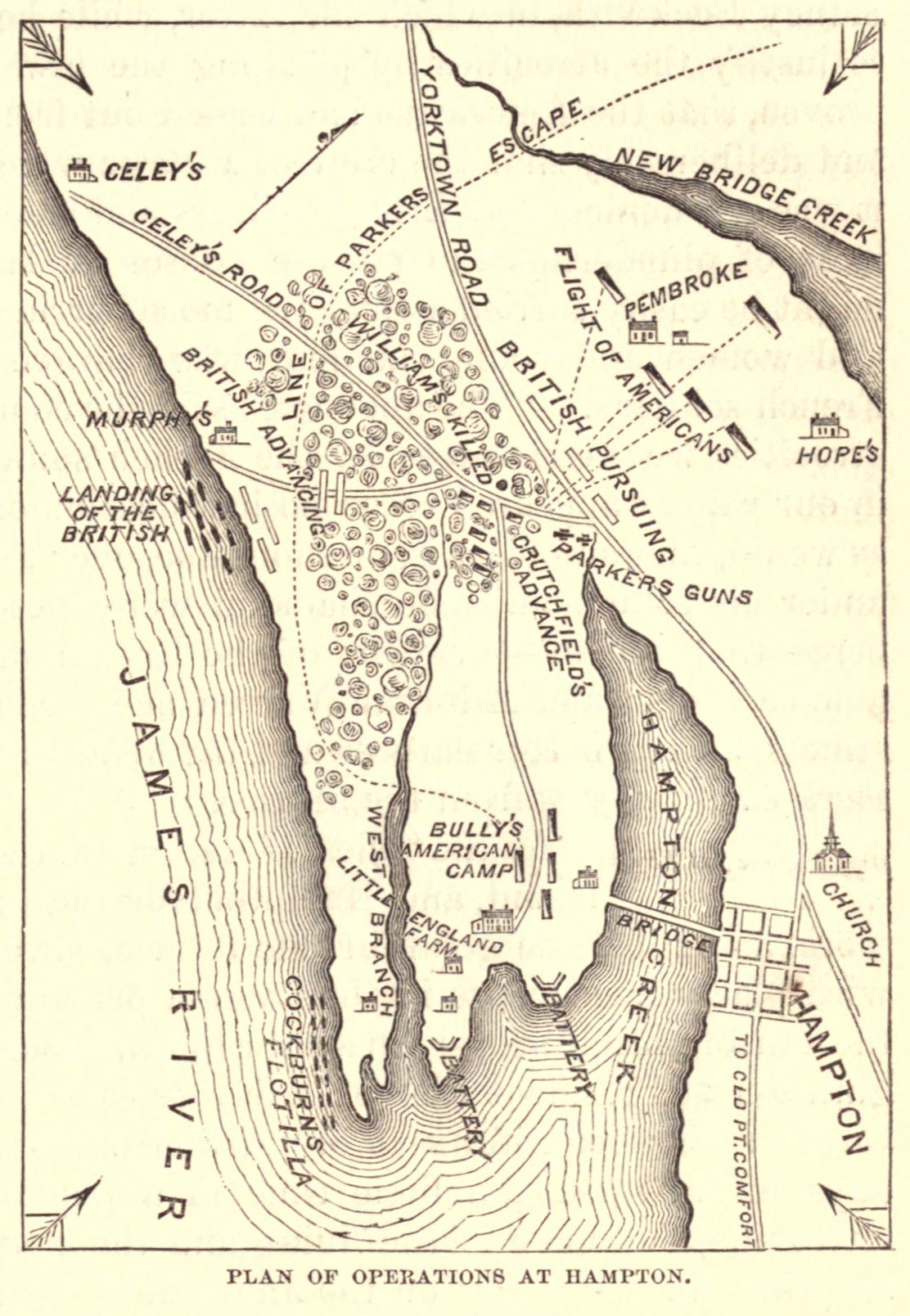
British invade Hampton during the War of 1812

In 1813, the fort was captured again by the British as part of the War of 1812. Shortly after the war ended, the US Army built a more substantial stone facility at Old Point Comfort. It was called Fort Monroe in honor of President James Monroe. The new installation and adjacent Fort Calhoun (on a man-made island across the channel) were completed in 1834. Fort Monroe is the largest stone fort ever built in the United States.

Fort Monroe, Hampton and the surrounding area played several important roles during the American Civil War (1861–1865). Although most of Virginia became part of the Confederate States of America, Fort Monroe remained in Union hands. It became notable as a historic and symbolic site of early freedom for former slaves under the provisions of contraband policies and later the Emancipation Proclamation. After the War, former Confederate President, Jefferson Davis was imprisoned in the area now known as the Casemate Museum on the base.

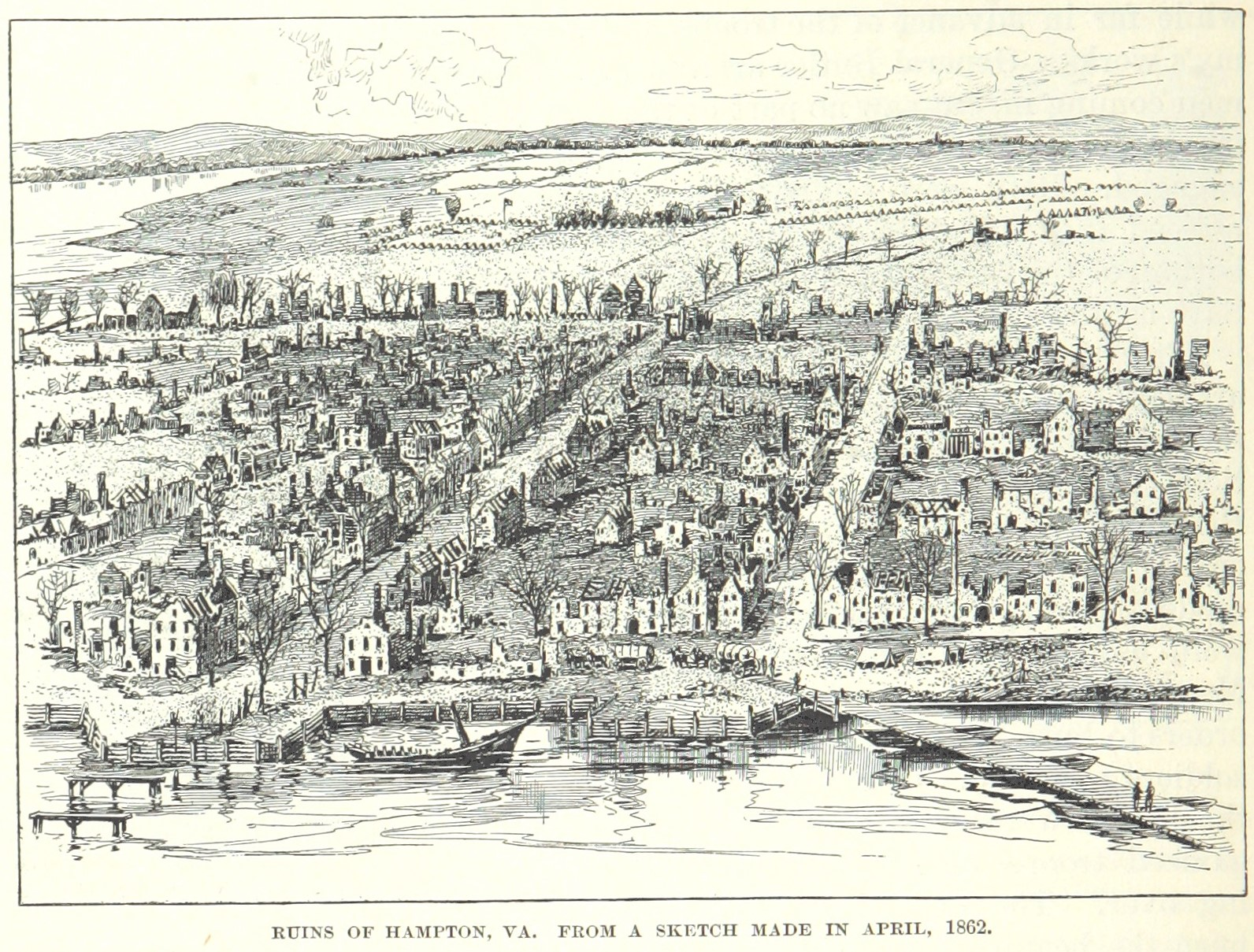
The ruins of Hampton in 1862

To the northwest of Fort Monroe, the Town of Hampton had the misfortune to be attacked during the American Revolutionary War and burned down during the British invasion of 1813 and the American Civil War. From the ruins of Hampton left by evacuating Confederates in 1861, "Contraband" slaves (formerly owned by Confederates and under a degree of Union protection) built the Grand Contraband Camp, the first self-contained African American community in the United States. A number of modern-day Hampton streets retain their names from that community. The large number of contraband slaves who sought the refuge of Fort Monroe and the Grand Contraband Camp led to educational efforts which eventually included establishment of Hampton University, site of the famous Emancipation Oak.

The original site of the Native American's Kecoughtan Settlement was near the present site of a Hampton Roads Transit facility. To the south of present-day Hampton, a small unrelated incorporated town also named Kecoughtan many years later and also located in Elizabeth City County was annexed by the city of Newport News in 1927. It is now part of that city's East End.

Hampton was incorporated as a city in 1849. On March 30, 1908, Hampton was separated from Elizabeth City County and became an independent city. However, it remained the county seat and continued to share many services with the county. On July 1, 1952, following approval of voters of each locality by referendum, the city of Hampton, the incorporated town of Phoebus and Elizabeth City County merged into the independent city of Hampton. It was the first of a series of political consolidations in the Hampton Roads region during the third quarter of the 20th century.

=== Modern military history ===
Hampton has a rich and extensive 20th-century military histor. The town is ome of Langley Air Force Base (the nation's first military installation dedicated solely to air power) and the home of the U.S. Air Force's 633rd Air Base Wing and 1st and 192nd Fighter Wings. Hampton has been a center of military aviation training, research and development for nearly a hundred years, from early prop planes and Zeppelins to rocket parts and advanced fighters. Its proximity to Norfolk means that Hampton has long been home to many Navy families. Together, many Air Force and Navy families in the Hampton area experienced significant losses in war and peacetime due to family members in combat and peacetime military accidents.

Fort Monroe was an active army base until its decommissioning on September 15, 2011. Shortly after, the fort was named a National Monument by President Barack Obama, on November 1.

==== Langley AFB during the Vietnam War ====
In particular, during the Vietnam War, Langley Air Force Base was a designated 'waiting base' and thousands of Air Force families were transferred to Hampton from all over the world to wait while their husbands and fathers served in Vietnam. Thousands of Navy families associated with Naval bases in Norfolk next door also waited in Hampton during this era. Vietnam was a very high casualty war for Air Force and Navy pilots (some types of planes experienced a 50% casualty rate), and Naval "river rats" who fought on the rivers of the Mekong Delta experienced high casualties as well. There accumulated over time, in the Hampton area, a high concentration of families of unaccounted for wartime casualties. In many cases Hampton-stationed military families of "Missing in Action" or "Prisoner of War" pilots and sailors spent many years in the area waiting to find out what had happened to their missing or captured airmen and sailors.

== Geography ==
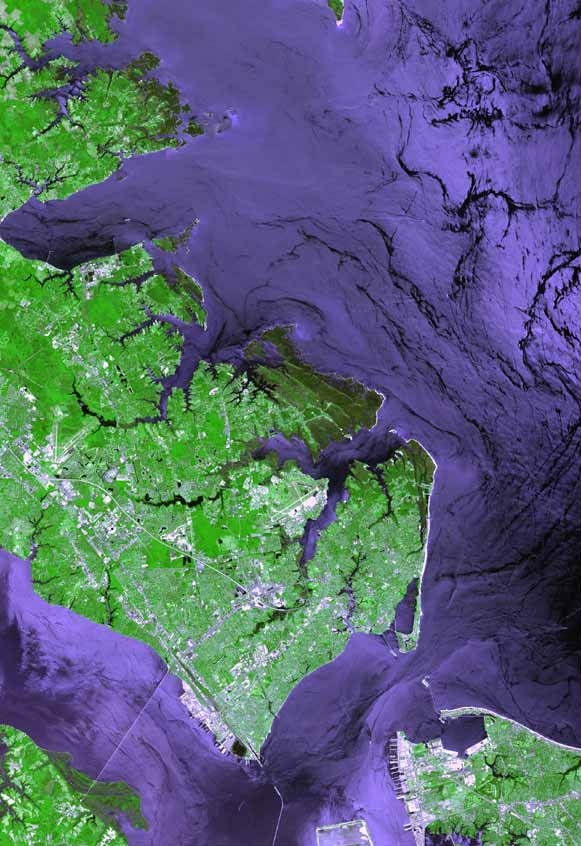
Satellite image of Hampton with Norfolk to its southeast across the Chesapeake Bay.

According to the United States Census Bureau, the city has a total area of 136.3 square miles (353 km^{2}), of which 51.46 square miles (133.3 km^{2}) is land and 84.84 square miles (219.7 km^{2}) (62.2%) is water.

=== Neighborhoods ===
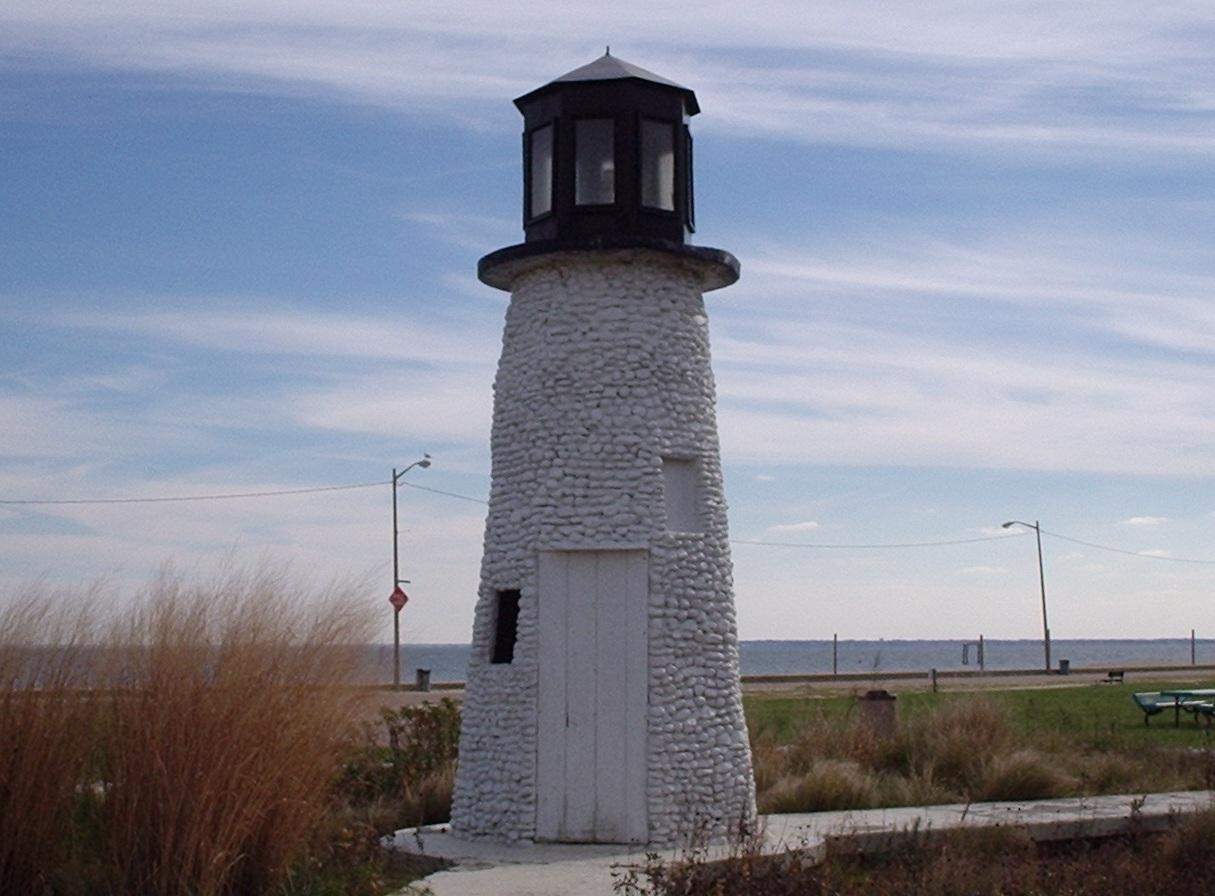
The old lighthouse at Buckroe Beach was built as a part of the amusement park

- Aberdeen Gardens
- Buckroe Beach
- Farmington
- Fox Hill
- Hampton Woods
- Northampton
- Newmarket
- Phoebus
- Victoria Boulevard Historic District
- Wythe, including the Olde Wythe Historic District

=== Climate ===
Hampton has a humid subtropical climate (Köppen: Cfa) characteristic of the Southeast United States. The weather in Hampton is temperate and seasonal with hot and humid summers and mild winters. The mean annual temperature is 60.2 °F (15.7 °C), with an average annual snowfall of 6 in (150 mm) and an average annual rainfall of 47 in (1,200 mm). The wettest month by average rainfall is August with an average of 2.4 inches of rain falling on 11–12 days, although in March it typically rains on more days with 2.3 inches of rain falling in 12 to 13 days. The hottest day on record was August 1, 1980, when the temperature hit 105.1 °F (40.6 °C). The lowest recorded temperature of −2.7 °F (−19.3 °C) was recorded on January 21, 1985.

Climate data for Norfolk International Airport, Virginia (1991–2020 normals, (Note: Mean monthly maxima and minima (i.e. the expected highest and lowest temperature readings at any point during the year or given month) calculated based on data at said location from 1991 to 2020.) extremes 1874–present (Note: Official records for Norfolk kept January 1874 to December 1945 at the Weather Bureau Office in downtown, and at Norfolk Int'l since January 1946. For more information, see Threadex.))
Month	Jan	Feb	Mar	Apr	May	Jun	Jul	Aug	Sep	Oct	Nov	Dec	Year
Record high °F (°C)	84 (29)	82 (28)	92 (33)	97 (36)	100 (38)	102 (39)	105 (41)	105 (41)	100 (38)	95 (35)	86 (30)	82 (28)	105 (41)
Mean maximum °F (°C)	72.4 (22.4)	74.3 (23.5)	80.7 (27.1)	86.9 (30.5)	91.5 (33.1)	95.7 (35.4)	98.4 (36.9)	95.3 (35.2)	92.0 (33.3)	86.0 (30.0)	78.9 (26.1)	73.4 (23.0)	99.3 (37.4)
Mean daily maximum °F (°C)	50.7 (10.4)	53.4 (11.9)	60.1 (15.6)	70.0 (21.1)	77.4 (25.2)	85.2 (29.6)	89.4 (31.9)	86.9 (30.5)	81.4 (27.4)	72.3 (22.4)	62.1 (16.7)	54.7 (12.6)	70.3 (21.3)
Daily mean °F (°C)	42.2 (5.7)	44.2 (6.8)	50.7 (10.4)	60.1 (15.6)	68.3 (20.2)	76.7 (24.8)	81.1 (27.3)	79.2 (26.2)	74.0 (23.3)	63.7 (17.6)	53.3 (11.8)	46.1 (7.8)	61.6 (16.4)
Mean daily minimum °F (°C)	33.6 (0.9)	35.1 (1.7)	41.3 (5.2)	50.1 (10.1)	59.1 (15.1)	68.1 (20.1)	72.8 (22.7)	71.6 (22.0)	66.6 (19.2)	55.1 (12.8)	44.4 (6.9)	37.6 (3.1)	52.9 (11.6)
Mean minimum °F (°C)	18.7 (−7.4)	21.6 (−5.8)	27.4 (−2.6)	37.0 (2.8)	46.9 (8.3)	56.0 (13.3)	64.7 (18.2)	63.7 (17.6)	55.5 (13.1)	40.4 (4.7)	29.8 (−1.2)	23.9 (−4.5)	16.8 (−8.4)
Record low °F (°C)	−3 (−19)	2 (−17)	14 (−10)	23 (−5)	36 (2)	45 (7)	54 (12)	49 (9)	40 (4)	27 (−3)	17 (−8)	5 (−15)	−3 (−19)
Average precipitation inches (mm)	3.41 (87)	2.90 (74)	3.69 (94)	3.37 (86)	3.78 (96)	4.43 (113)	6.08 (154)	5.88 (149)	5.40 (137)	3.86 (98)	3.10 (79)	3.28 (83)	49.18 (1,249)
Average snowfall inches (cm)	3.2 (8.1)	1.5 (3.8)	0.4 (1.0)	0.0 (0.0)	0.0 (0.0)	0.0 (0.0)	0.0 (0.0)	0.0 (0.0)	0.0 (0.0)	0.0 (0.0)	0.0 (0.0)	1.1 (2.8)	6.2 (16)
Average precipitation days (≥ 0.01 in)	10.7	9.2	10.9	10.0	11.2	9.7	10.6	10.2	9.4	7.7	8.9	9.9	118.4
Average snowy days (≥ 0.1 in)	1.7	1.3	0.5	0.0	0.0	0.0	0.0	0.0	0.0	0.0	0.0	0.5	4.0
Average relative humidity (%)	66.3	65.6	64.6	62.8	68.8	70.6	73.3	75.2	74.4	72.1	68.5	67.0	69.1
Average dew point °F (°C)	27.9 (−2.3)	28.9 (−1.7)	35.8 (2.1)	43.2 (6.2)	54.5 (12.5)	63.1 (17.3)	68.2 (20.1)	68.0 (20.0)	62.4 (16.9)	51.3 (10.7)	41.7 (5.4)	32.7 (0.4)	48.1 (9.0)
Mean monthly sunshine hours	171.5	175.2	229.3	252.8	271.7	280.1	278.3	260.4	231.4	208.3	175.7	160.4	2,695.1
Percentage possible sunshine	56	58	62	64	62	64	62	62	62	60	57	53	61
Average ultraviolet index	2	4	5	7	8	10	9	9	7	5	3	2	6
Source 1: NOAA (relative humidity and sun 1961–1990)
Source 2: Weather Atlas (UV)

== Demographics ==
Historical population
Census	Pop.	Note	%±
1850	787		—
1860	1,848		134.8%
1870	2,300		24.5%
1880	2,684		16.7%
1890	2,513		−6.4%
1900	2,764		10.0%
1910	5,505		99.2%
1920	6,138		11.5%
1930	6,382		4.0%
1940	5,898		−7.6%
1950	5,966		1.2%
1960	89,258		1,396.1%
1970	120,779		35.3%
1980	122,617		1.5%
1990	133,793		9.1%
2000	146,437		9.5%
2010	137,436		−6.1%
2020	137,148		−0.2%
2025 (est.)	137,315	▲	0.1%
U.S. Decennial Census; 1790-1960 1900-1990; 1990-2000 2010-2020

=== Racial and ethnic composition ===
Hampton city, Virginia – Racial and ethnic composition Note: the US Census treats Hispanic/Latino as an ethnic category. This table excludes Latinos from the racial categories and assigns them to a separate category. Hispanics/Latinos may be of any race.
Race / Ethnicity (NH = Non-Hispanic)	Pop 1980	Pop 1990	Pop 2000	Pop 2010	Pop 2020	% 1980	% 1990	% 2000	% 2010	% 2020
White alone (NH)	77,443	76,909	70,963	56,283	49,389	63.16%	57.48%	48.46%	40.95%	36.01%
Black or African American alone (NH)	41,710	51,519	64,795	66,878	66,632	34.02%	38.51%	44.25%	48.66%	48.58%
Native American or Alaska Native alone (NH)	241	376	574	498	485	0.20%	0.28%	0.39%	0.36%	0.35%
Asian alone (NH)	1,223	2,260	2,650	2,950	3,493	1.00%	1.69%	1.81%	2.15%	2.55%
Native Hawaiian or Pacific Islander alone (NH)	x	x	114	132	209	x	x	0.08%	0.10%	0.15%
Other race alone (NH)	297	93	248	266	895	0.24%	0.07%	0.17%	0.19%	0.65%
Mixed race or Multiracial (NH)	x	x	2,940	4,188	7,634	x	x	2.01%	3.05%	5.57%
Hispanic or Latino (any race)	1,703	2,636	4,153	6,241	8,411	1.39%	1.97%	2.84%	4.54%	6.13%
Total	122,617	133,793	146,437	137,436	137,148	100.00%	100.00%	100.00%	100.00%	100.00%

=== 2020 census ===
As of the 2020 census, Hampton had a population of 137,148 and a median age of 37.2 years. 20.4% of residents were under the age of 18 and 16.5% of residents were 65 years of age or older. For every 100 females there were 90.9 males, and for every 100 females age 18 and over there were 88.1 males age 18 and over.

99.7% of residents lived in urban areas, while 0.3% lived in rural areas.

There were 57,612 households in Hampton, of which 26.8% had children under the age of 18 living in them. Of all households, 36.4% were married-couple households, 22.0% were households with a male householder and no spouse or partner present, and 35.2% were households with a female householder and no spouse or partner present. About 32.9% of all households were made up of individuals and 11.6% had someone living alone who was 65 years of age or older.

There were 62,444 housing units, of which 7.7% were vacant. The homeowner vacancy rate was 2.3% and the rental vacancy rate was 6.6%.

Racial composition as of the 2020 census
Race	Number	Percent
White	51,202	37.3%
Black or African American	67,915	49.5%
American Indian and Alaska Native	647	0.5%
Asian	3,568	2.6%
Native Hawaiian and Other Pacific Islander	241	0.2%
Some other race	3,220	2.3%
Two or more races	10,355	7.6%
Hispanic or Latino (of any race)	8,411	6.1%

=== 2010 Census ===
Age distribution in Hampton

As of the census of 2010, there were 137,436 people, 53,887 households, and 35,888 families residing in the city. The population density was 2,828.0 inhabitants per square mile (1,091.9/km^{2}). There were 57,311 housing units at an average density of 1,106.8 units per square mile (427.3 units/km^{2}). The racial makeup of the city was 49.6% Black or African American, 42.7% White, 2.2% Asian, 0.4% Native American, 0.1% Pacific Islander, 1.3% from other races, and 3.7% from two or more races. 4.5% of the population were Hispanic or Latino of any race.

There were 53,887 households, out of which 32.5% had children under the age of 18 living with them, 46.2% were married couples living together, 16.4% had a female householder with no husband present, and 33.4% were non-families. 26.6% of all households were made up of individuals, and 7.9% had someone living alone who was 65 years of age or older. The average household size was 2.49 and the average family size was 3.02.

The age distribution is 24.2% under the age of 18, 12.6% from 18 to 24, 32.5% from 25 to 44, 20.4% from 45 to 64, and 10.3% who were 65 years of age or older. The median age was 34 years. For every 100 females, there were 98.3 males. For every 100 females age 18 and over, there were 96.6 males.

Population update: estimated population in July 2002: 145,921 (-0.4% change) Males: 72,579 (49.6%), Females: 73,858 (50.4%)

The Census estimate for 2005 shows that the city's population was down slightly to more, 145,579.

The median income for a household in the city was $39,532, and the median income for a family was $46,110. Males had a median income of $31,666 versus $24,578 for females. The per capita income for the city was $19,774. About 8.8% of families and 11.3% of the population were below the poverty line, including 15.9% of those under age 18 and 8.6% of those age 65 or over.

== Arts and culture ==
=== Arts and museums ===
Hampton is home to several arts venues and museums dedicated to Hampton's rich history. Notable venues in the city include The American Theatre, the Casemate Museum, the Charles Taylor Visual Arts Center, the Hampton History Museum, the Hampton University Museum, the Performing & Creative Arts Center, and the Virginia Air & Space Center.

The Hampton Coliseum, a multi-purpose arena built in 1968, serves as a major venue for entertainment acts such as Monster Jam and WWE wrestling, musical concerts from artists such as Bruce Springsteen, The Rolling Stones, The Grateful Dead and Phish and various regional sports games from the area. The arena has a seating capacity of 9,800 to 13,800 depending on configuration.

=== Libraries ===
The city is served by the Hampton Public Library. The system began in 1926 as the first free county library in Virginia. Today, the main library includes the main library and three branches.

=== Points of interest ===
- Air Power Park
- Bluebird Gap Farm
- Buckroe Beach
- Downtown Hampton Historic District
- Emancipation Oak
- Fort Monroe
- Chapel of the Centurion
- Fort Wool
- Hampton Coliseum
- Hampton National Cemetery
- Langley Air Force Base
- Langley Speedway
- NASA Langley Research Center
- National Institute of Aerospace
- Old Point Comfort
- Peninsula Town Center
- St. John's Church
- Veterans Affairs Medical Center
- Virginia Air and Space Center
- War Memorial Stadium

== Sports ==
The Peninsula Pilots of the Coastal Plain League are a collegiate summer baseball league based in Hampton. The Pilots have been playing at War Memorial Stadium since 2000. The Hampton University Pirates & Lady Pirates compete in the Big South Conference in the NCAA Division I Football Championship Subdivision.

High school sports (especially football & basketball) play a large role in the city's sports culture. Sporting stars such as Allen Iverson, Francena McCoroy, and T'erea Brown are from Hampton. The city's stadium, Darling Stadium, serves as the high school football stadium with games usually spread over Thursday, Friday, and Saturday nights. The stadium also hosts various track-and-field events.

Additional sports options can be found just outside Hampton. On the collegiate level, the College of William and Mary, Norfolk State University and Old Dominion University offer NCAA Division I athletics. Virginia Wesleyan College and Christopher Newport University also provide sports at the NCAA Division III level.

Professional sports can be found in the area as well. In Norfolk, the Norfolk Tides of the International League and the Norfolk Admirals of the American Hockey League field baseball and hockey teams respectively. In Virginia Beach, the Hampton Roads Piranhas field men's and women's professional soccer teams.

== Government ==
United States presidential election results for Hampton, Virginia
Year	Republican		Democratic		Third party(ies)	
Year	No.	%	No.	%	No.	%
1912	13	3.26%	353	88.47%	33	8.27%
1916	56	13.66%	350	85.37%	4	0.98%
1920	152	19.82%	601	78.36%	14	1.83%
1924	129	20.98%	471	76.59%	15	2.44%
1928	544	46.94%	615	53.06%	0	0.00%
1932	294	27.12%	772	71.22%	18	1.66%
1936	190	16.35%	971	83.56%	1	0.09%
1940	215	18.01%	975	81.66%	4	0.34%
1944	297	23.08%	987	76.69%	3	0.23%
1948	371	30.04%	727	58.87%	137	11.09%
1952	5,505	52.52%	4,946	47.19%	30	0.29%
1956	7,432	57.24%	5,108	39.34%	443	3.41%
1960	7,623	51.48%	7,133	48.17%	52	0.35%
1964	8,731	39.17%	13,542	60.76%	15	0.07%
1968	10,532	32.30%	11,308	34.68%	10,766	33.02%
1972	21,897	65.49%	10,648	31.85%	890	2.66%
1976	15,021	41.67%	19,202	53.27%	1,825	5.06%
1980	17,023	45.08%	18,517	49.03%	2,225	5.89%
1984	25,537	57.95%	18,180	41.25%	351	0.80%
1988	24,034	54.85%	19,106	43.60%	678	1.55%
1992	19,219	38.53%	23,395	46.90%	7,264	14.56%
1996	16,596	37.29%	24,493	55.03%	3,418	7.68%
2000	19,561	40.85%	27,490	57.41%	836	1.75%
2004	23,399	41.98%	32,016	57.44%	326	0.58%
2008	20,476	30.14%	46,917	69.05%	550	0.81%
2012	18,640	28.03%	46,966	70.64%	884	1.33%
2016	17,902	28.71%	41,312	66.25%	3,142	5.04%
2020	18,430	27.97%	46,220	70.14%	1,251	1.90%
2024	18,383	29.26%	43,357	69.01%	1,083	1.72%

=== Local ===
The city uses a council-manager government, with Jimmy Gray serving as mayor, Mary Bunting serving as the city manager, and six council members serving as representatives to the districts in the city.

As of 2025, the Hampton City Council consisted of:

- Jimmy Gray, Mayor
- Steven L. Brown, Vice Mayor
- Randy Bowman, Councilman
- Carolyn Campbell, Councilwoman
- Michelle Ferebee, Councilwoman
- Hope Harper, Councilwoman
- Martha Mugler, Councilwoman

=== Federal ===
Hampton is located in Virginia's 3rd congressional district, represented by Bobby Scott.(Democrat).

== Education ==
The main provider of public primary and secondary education is Hampton City Public Schools. There are four high schools – Kecoughtan, Bethel, Phoebus, and Hampton – eighteen K-5 elementary schools, two PK-8 schools, five middle schools, one early childhood center, and one gifted center in the city.

Several private schools are located in the area, including Denbigh Baptist Christian School, Hampton Roads Academy, and Peninsula Catholic High School.

Virginia School for the Deaf, Blind and Multi-Disabled at Hampton, operated by the State of Virginia, was formerly in Hampton.

=== Colleges and universities ===
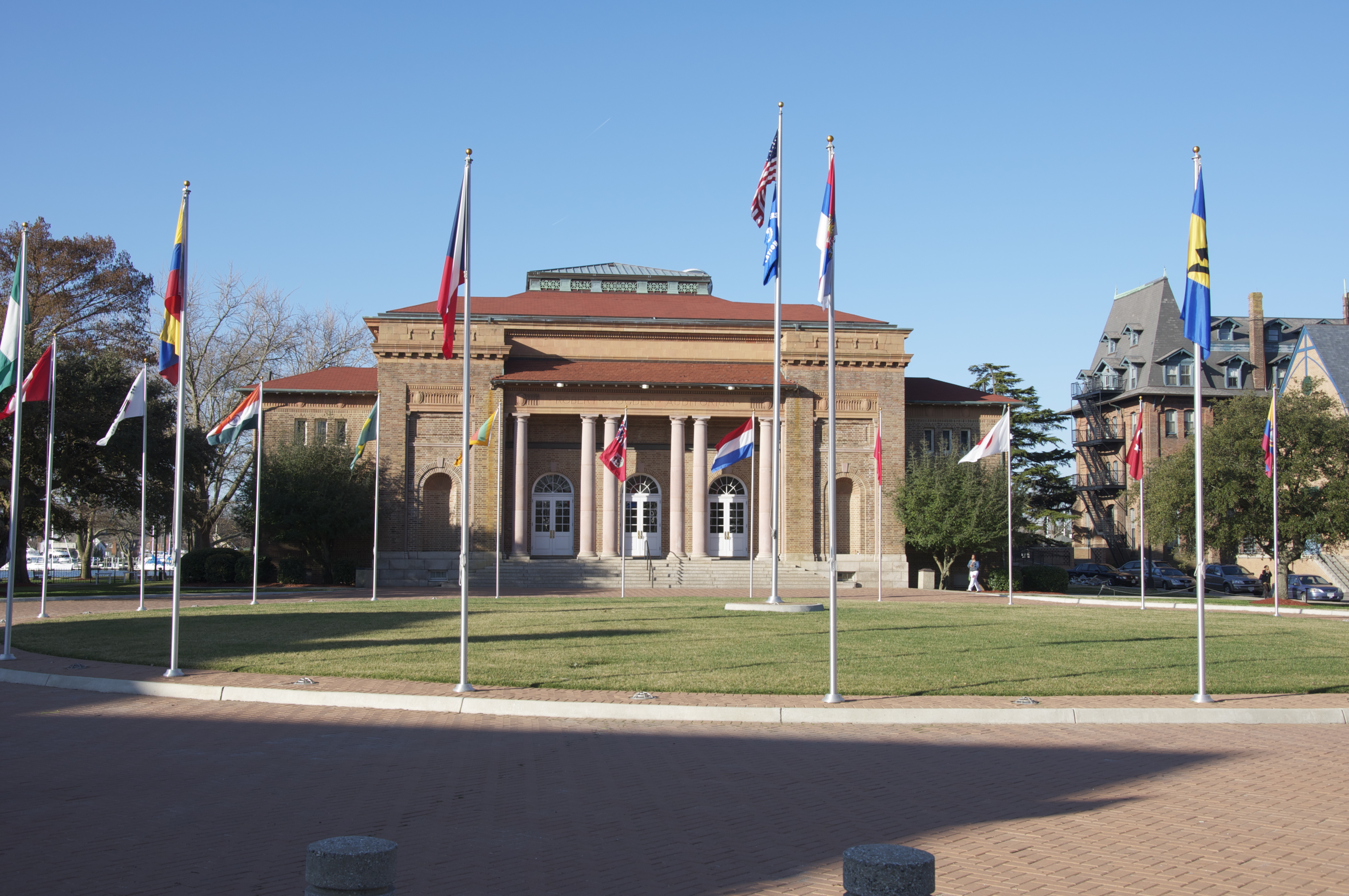
Ogden Hall at Hampton University

The city contains Hampton University and Virginia Peninsula Community College. Other nearby universities in the Hampton Roads region include Christopher Newport University, Old Dominion University, Norfolk State University, and The College of William and Mary.

== Media ==
Hampton's daily newspaper is the Newport News–based Daily Press. Other papers include Norfolk's The Virginian-Pilot, Port Folio Weekly, the New Journal and Guide, and the Hampton Roads Business Journal. Coastal Virginia Magazine serves as a bi-monthly regional magazine for Hampton and the Hampton Roads area. Hampton Roads Times serves as an online magazine for all the Hampton Roads cities and counties. Hampton is served by a variety of radio stations on the AM and FM dials, with towers located around the Hampton Roads area.

Hampton is also served by several television stations. The Hampton Roads designated market area (DMA) is the 42nd largest in the U.S. with 712,790 homes (0.64% of the total U.S.). The major network television affiliates are WTKR-TV 3 (CBS), WAVY-TV 10 (NBC), WVEC-TV 13 (ABC), WGNT 27 (Independent), WTVZ 33 (MyNetworkTV), WVBT 43 (Fox, with CW on DT2), and WPXV 49 (ION Television). The Public Broadcasting Service member station is WHRO-TV 15. Hampton residents also can receive independent stations, such as WSKY broadcasting on channel 4 from the Outer Banks of North Carolina and WGBS-LD broadcasting on channel 11. Hampton is served by Verizon FiOS and Cox Cable.

== Infrastructure ==
=== Transportation ===
==== Roads and highways ====
In the Hampton Roads region, water crossings are a major issue for land-based transportation. The city is fortunate to have a good network of local streets and bridges to cross the various rivers and creeks. Many smaller bridges, especially those along Mercury Boulevard, were named to honor the original NASA astronauts, who had trained extensively at NASA's Langley facilities.

The city is located contiguously to the neighboring independent cities of both Newport News and Poquoson. Many roads and streets are available to travel between them. Likewise, Williamsburg, Yorktown and the counties of James City and York are also located nearby in the Peninsula sub-region, and many roads lead to them.

To reach most of its other neighbors in the South Hampton Roads sub-region, it is necessary to cross the harbor and/or the mouth of the James River. There are 3 major motor vehicle crossings. Among these are the Hampton Roads Bridge–Tunnel (HRBT) and the Monitor–Merrimac Memorial Bridge–Tunnel (MMMBT), each forming part of the Hampton Roads Beltway. The HRBT is located on Interstate 64 near downtown Hampton and the MMMBT is a few miles away on Interstate 664 near downtown Newport News. (These two major interstates converge in Hampton near the Hampton Coliseum.) The third crossing option is the James River Bridge, also in Newport News, which connects to Isle of Wight County and the town of Smithfield.

Hampton is also served by several major primary and secondary highways. These notably include U.S. Routes 17, 60 and 258, and Virginia State Routes 134 and 143.

==== Local and regional public transportation ====
The Hampton Transit Center, located close to the downtown area at the intersection of West Pembroke Avenue and King Street, offers a hub for local and intercity public transportation. It hosts HRT buses, Greyhound/Trailways services and taxicabs.

Hampton Roads Transit (HRT) is the local provider of transit service within the city, as well offering a regional bus system with routes to and from seven other cities in Hampton Roads.

==== Intercity bus service ====
Intercity bus service is provided by Greyhound Lines and its Carolina Trailways affiliate. The buses serve the Hampton Transit Center. Low cost curbside intercity bus service is also provided by Megabus, with service to Richmond, Washington, D.C., Baltimore, and Philadelphia.

==== Amtrak ====
Hampton is served by several Amtrak trains a day, with direct service from Newport News station in nearby Newport News (on Warwick Boulevard just west of Mercury Boulevard) through Williamsburg and Richmond to points along the Northeast Corridor from Washington DC through Baltimore, Philadelphia, and New York City all the way to Boston. At Richmond, connections can be made for other Amtrak destinations nationwide.

==== Air ====
Hampton is served by two commercial airports. Newport News/Williamsburg International Airport (IATA: PHF) is in Newport News, and Norfolk International Airport (IATA: ORF, ICAO: KORF, FAA LID: ORF) is across the harbor in Norfolk. Both are along portions of Interstate 64.

The primary airport for the Virginia Peninsula is the Newport News/Williamsburg International Airport in Newport News. Originally known as Patrick Henry Field (hence its airline code letters "PHF"), it was built on the site of Camp Patrick Henry, formerly a World War II facility. It is one of the fastest growing airports in the country, and it reported having served 1,058,839 passengers in 2005. The airport recently added a fourth airline carrier, Frontier Airlines, becoming the first new airline to come to the region in over eight years, despite the economic recession conditions. 2010 was to be the busiest year by passenger count in the airport's history.

The larger Norfolk International Airport (often known locally by its code letters "ORF") also serves the region. The airport is near the Chesapeake Bay, along the city limits between Norfolk and Virginia Beach. Seven airlines provide nonstop services to 25 destinations. During 2006, ORF had 3,703,664 passengers take off or land at its facility and 68,778,934 pounds of cargo were processed through its facilities.

The Chesapeake Regional Airport provides general aviation services. It is in South Hampton Roads in the independent city of Chesapeake.

== Notable people ==
American history

- James Armistead, America's first African American spy, provided the information to the Continental Army that Cornwallis was headed to Yorktown in 1781. This led to the forced surrender of Cornwallis.
- Samuel Chapman Armstrong, Union general in American Civil War; founder of Hampton Normal and Agricultural Institute, later Hampton University
- James Barron, U.S. Navy commodore, captain of frigate USS Chesapeake.
- Jefferson Davis, president of the Confederate States of America, imprisoned in a casemate at Fort Monroe after the American Civil War
- Evelyn Grubb, POW wife, author, co-founder and National President of the National League of Families
- Mary S. Peake, African American humanitarian; progenitor of Hampton Institute; the first Black teacher in the American Missionary Association
- Booker Taliaferro Washington (commonly known as Booker T Washington), founder of Tuskegee Institute, educator, author, African American statesman
- George Robert Watkins, politician, member of Pennsylvania State Senate and United States Congress
- George Wythe, classical scholar, first law professor in U.S., mayor of Williamsburg, attorney general of Virginia Colony, Continental Congress member, speaker of the state assembly, a framer of the federal Constitution

Music

- Robert Nathaniel Dett, notable composer, pianist, choir director, educator, administrator at Hampton Institute; a founder of United Service Organization
- Steve Earle, popular country-rock musician and songwriter
- Jeff Parker, experimental jazz and rock guitarist in the Chicago-based post-rock group Tortoise
- Jerry Roush, vocalist known for his time in Sky Eats Airplane, Of Mice and Men, and Glass Cloud
- DeVante Swing and Mr. Dalvin, of the R&B group Jodeci
- Victor Wooten, bassist for the Grammy Award winning "Blu-Bop" group Béla Fleck and the Flecktones
- Weldon Irvine, composer, pianist
- DRAM, rapper, artist

Science

- Roy F. Brissenden, World War II pilot, physicist, aeronautical engineer, mechanical engineer, teacher, inventor, project leader at Hampton, Langley Research Center NACA/NASA
- Mary Jackson, engineer and mathematician who contributed to America's aeronautics and space programs
- Katherine Johnson (1918–2020), physicist, space scientist, and mathematician who contributed to America's aeronautics and space programs
- Christopher C. Kraft, Jr., aeronautical engineer; administrator at Hampton, Langley Research Center NACA / NASA; flight director of the space program
- H. Allen Orr (born 1960), evolutionary biologist
- Anne Rudloe (1947–2012), marine biologist

Sports

- Robert Banks, Linebacker/defensive end; national high school player of the year by the Columbus, Ohio Touchdown Club in 1982
- Tajh Boyd, professional football player
- Elton Brown, offensive lineman of the Arizona Cardinals
- Jim Burrow, defensive back for the Green Bay Packers
- Steve Cardenas, Brazilian jiu-jitsu martial artist & actor who starred as Rocky DeSantos; Red Ape Ninja Ranger and Zeo Ranger III Blue.
- Jake Cave, outfielder for the Minnesota Twins
- Ronald Curry, professional football player for the Oakland Raiders, former Hampton High School star football quarterback
- Chris Durkin, soccer player
- La'Keshia Frett, former WNBA basketball player; led Phoebus High School to state championship in 1992
- Shaun Gayle, special teams captain of the 1985 Super Bowl champion Chicago Bears football team, and played with the San Diego Chargers
- Marques Hagans, quarterback/wide receiver with the St. Louis Rams
- Chris Hanburger, popular Washington Redskins player in the 1970s and member of the Pro Football Hall of Fame
- Michael Husted, former professional football player for the Tampa Bay Buccaneers, former Hampton High School placekicker
- Allen Iverson, former all-star and MVP basketball player for the Philadelphia 76ers, member of Naismith Memorial Basketball Hall of Fame
- Jerod Mayo, former NFL linebacker and former head coach, for the New England Patriots
- Art Price, professional football player for the Atlanta Falcons
- Dwight Stephenson, professional football player for the Miami Dolphins and member of the Pro Football Hall of Fame
- John Sturdivant, professional football player
- Tyrod Taylor, professional football quarterback for the Los Angeles Chargers
- Mike Tomlin, former head coach for the Pittsburgh Steelers
- Jimmy F. Williams, professional football player for the Atlanta Falcons
- Xavier Adibi, former professional football linebacker
- Jeremiah Owusu-Koramoah, current NFL linebacker for the Cleveland Browns

Other

- David Funderburk, U.S. Ambassador to Romania, U.S. Congressman
- Trent Garrett, actor
- Oz Scott, director
- Margot Lee Shetterly, author of Hidden Figures
- Archibald H. Sunderland, U.S. Army major general
- Jean Yokum, president of Langley Federal Credit Union
- Kelvin Taylor, actor from Hampton.
- William Devin Howell, serial killer
- Patricia Tolliver Giles, United States district judge for the Eastern District of Virginia

== Sister cities ==
Hampton has four sister cities:

- Southampton, England, United Kingdom
- Vendôme, Loir-et-Cher, France
- Pietermaritzburg, South Africa
- Anyang, Gyeonggi, South Korea

== See also ==
- Bay Shore Beach
- Bluebird Gap Farm
- Buckroe Beach
- Hampton Roads (many regional aspects covered)
- List of athletes from Hampton Roads
- List of famous people from Hampton Roads
- List of Mayors of Hampton, Virginia
- National Register of Historic Places listings in Hampton, Virginia
- Old Point Comfort
- Virginia Peninsula
