= Kecoughtan, Virginia =

Seventeenth century Virginia Colony city

Coordinates: 37°00′52″N 76°20′47″W

In the seventeenth century, Kecoughtan was the name of the settlement now known as Hampton, Virginia. In the early twentieth century, it was also the name of a town nearby in Elizabeth City County. It was annexed into the City of Newport News in 1927.

== Colonial and Native American Kecoughtan ==
Kecoughtan in Virginia was originally named Kikotan (also spelled Kiccowtan, Kikowtan), the name of the Algonquian people living there when colonists led by Captain John Smith arrived in the Hampton Roads area in 1607.

According to William Strachey, Powhatan had slain the weroance at Kecoughtan in 1597, appointing his own young son Pochins as successor there, while resettling some of the tribe at the Piankatank River. Powhatan annihilated the inhabitants at Piankatank in 1608.

The Kecoughtan village was where Captain John Smith and his group of settlers received their first welcome in 1607. The tribe remained generally friendly to them until the summer of 1609, when president John Smith sent Captain Martin to forcibly take over the island inhabited by the Nansemonds, across the mouth of the James. A company of 17 men mutinied from Martin and absconded to Kecoughtan to buy corn, where they were all killed. Martin abandoned the Nansemonds' island and returned to Jamestown.

The colonists then built Fort Algernon at Old Point Comfort beside their main village in October 1609. After the arrival of Lord De La Warr, the colonists seized the native village on July 9, 1610, by luring them out with a tambourine player, then attacking them. The surviving Kecoughtans fled to merge with other groups in the Powhatan Confederacy.

On the same date in 1610, the Elizabeth City Parish was founded. The area and the parish has since been continuously occupied. Renamed St. John's Episcopal Church in 1830, the parish is the oldest English-speaking parish in the US today. The current church, constructed in 1728, is the fourth built for the parish.

Kecoughtan became part of Elizabeth River Shire in 1634, and Elizabeth City County in 1637. In the 1690s, Kecoughtan became part of the newly incorporated Town of Hampton, which later became an independent city. Elizabeth City County and its only incorporated town, Phoebus, both agreed to a consolidation with Hampton in 1952, forming the current City of Hampton.

Through Fort Algernon and the Kecoughtan settlement, Hampton can claim to be the oldest continually occupied English-speaking settlement in the United States, by virtue of Jamestown (which usually claims this distinction) having been abandoned for two days in June 1610, and also because after 1698, when the capital of the Virginia colony and the parish seat moved from James town to Williamsburg, the buildings at Jamestown, including the church, were abandoned.

== Town of Kecoughtan (20th century) ==
In an area immediately to the southwest of the original settlement, the incorporated town of Kecoughtan was formed on January 1, 1916, within Elizabeth City County. It was located between Salters Creek and Hampton Roads and was developed by the Newport News, Hampton, and Old Point Development Company. The major business located in the town was Elizabeth Buxton Hospital. It was served by Woodrow Wilson School and a town hall and firestation.

Eleven years later it was annexed by the independent city of Newport News on January 1, 1927. At that time the town's population was 1,198 and the total length of its streets five miles. The hard surface roadway connecting the area to the city of Hampton opened in 1910 and was named Kecoughtan Road for the town. It was incorporated into US Route 60.

== See also ==
- Former counties, cities, and towns of Virginia
