= Hampton River =

River in Virginia, United States

Coordinates: 37°2′0″N 76°20′15″W

The Hampton River is a 3.2-mile-long (5.1 km) tidal estuary which empties into Hampton Roads near its mouth. Hampton Roads in turn empties into the southern end of the Chesapeake Bay, in southeast Virginia, United States. The Hampton River is located entirely within the city of Hampton.

Much like several other minor rivers of the area, the Hampton River has also been referred to as Hampton Creek. The Hampton River was named for Henry Wriothesley, 3rd Earl of Southampton, an important leader of the Virginia Company of London.

During the late 17th and early 18th centuries, the Hampton River was well-traveled by sloops, bringing goods to and from the Colony of Virginia.

In 1719, a victorious Lt. Robert Maynard of the British Navy returned to Hampton with the head of the pirate Blackbeard hanging from his ship. Having killed Blackbeard in battle during November 1718, he brought back the head as proof. The head was then placed at the mouth of the river, also known as Teach's Point, on a stake, as a warning to other pirates.

Hampton Institute, now University, was established on the Hampton River in 1868. The university's seal depicts the Hampton River, with a sunrise over the water interpreted as the rise of educational opportunities, and a boat symbolizing the primary mode of transportation to Hampton in its early years.

== See also ==
- List of Virginia rivers
