= John Farrar (burgess) =

Virginia planter and politician (born c.1632)

John Ferrar

Member Virginia House of Burgesses for Henrico County
- In office 1680–1684 Serving with William Byrd, William Randolph
- Preceded by: Abel Gower
- Succeeded by: Richard Kennon

Personal details
- Born: circa 1632 Jordan Point, Virginia
- Died: March 1685 Farrar's Island, Henrico County, Colonial Virginia
- Relations: William Farrar(father), Cecily Jordan Farrar (mother), William Farrar Jr. (brother), William Farrar III (nephew)
- Occupation: Planter, militia officer, politician

Military service
- Branch/service: Henrico County, Virginia militia
- Rank: Lt.Col.

John Farrar (circa 1632 - March 1685) was a Virginia planter and politician.

== Early life ==
The youngest and last surviving son of William Farrar, who had married the widowed Cecily (a/k/a Cisley) Jordan. His father had emigrated from England and became a lawyer, planter and member of the Virginia Governor's Council, but died in 1637 when both his sons were boys. John may have been named to honor his grandfather (died 1628), or his great-uncle John Ferrar (1588–1657) who was the deputy governor and treasurer of the Virginia Company of London. He had a brother (William Farrar Jr.) and sister (Cicely Jr.) who survived infancy. He may have had elder half-sisters who were his mother's children by previous husbands;

== Career ==
Despite primogeniture, John Farrar received a tenth of his father's estate from his elder brother William Farrar Jr. in 1647 and later inherited additional land from the same man, who named him executor alongside his eldest son William Farrar III. In February 1678 he deeded some land to William's heirs, including William Farrar III who would also sit in the House of Burgesses at century's end.

John Farrar twice won election to the House of Burgesses as one of the men representing Henrico County, serving (part-time) in the assembly sessions held in 1680–1682 (after the suppression of Bacon's Rebellion), as well as that in 1684. He also rose to become Lieutenant Colonel in the local militia (militia service being mandatory for all white men in the era) and served as justice of the peace for Henrico County from 1677–1684, as well as the county sheriff in 1683.

== Death and legacy ==
John Farrar died around March 1685, never having married. His will bequeathed 200 acres of land on the Appomattox River (presumably his father's original homestead) and livestock to his former neighbor Thomas Batte and his three daughters, with the remainder to his "cousins"—William Farrar, Thomas Farrar and John Farrar, as well as Mary Worsham (wife of George Worsham) and Martha Shipley (wife of Walter Shipley of nearby Charles City County). While Farrar refers to "negroes & servants" in his will, he explicitly freed his "Negro Jack" the following Christmas day. He was probably buried on Farrar's Island, or on the mainland from which the peninsula jutted, but subsequent floods have obliterated the gravesite.

Farrar's Island would remain in the family for about a century; William Farrar IV and his uncle Thomas both sold their parcels to Thomas Randolph in 1727. In modern times, Farrar's Island is part of the Dutch Gap Conservation Area and Henricus Historical Park, both administered by Chesterfield County, Virginia.
