= William Farrar III =

Virginia planter and politician (born c.1632)

John Ferrar

Member Virginia House of Burgesses for Henrico County
- In office 1700–1702 Serving with Thomas Cocke
- Preceded by: James Cocke
- Succeeded by: Francis Epps

Personal details
- Born: c. 1658 Farrar's Island, Henrico County, Colonial Virginia
- Died: 1721 Farrar's Island, Henrico County, Colonial Virginia
- Spouse(s): Priscilla Baugh; MaryTanner Ligon
- Relations: William Farrar(father), Cecily Jordan Farrar (mother), John (brother)
- Children: at least 3 sons (William Farrar IV, Abell and George) and a daughter Priscilla
- Occupation: Planter, militia officer, politician

Military service
- Branch/service: Henrico County, Virginia militia
- Rank: Captain

William Farrar III (c.1658 - 1721) was a Virginia planter and politician who represented Henrico County in the House of Burgesses during the 1700-1702 term.

== Early life ==
The eldest son of William Farrar Jr. and his wife Mary, was under legal age, when his father died in 1676, and his uncle John appears to have operated plantations which his father had bequeathed to his sons, particularly on Farrar's Island in Henrico County, which he bequeathed to this man and his brothers when he died in 1685. Their grandfather, also William Farrar had emigrated from England and became a lawyer, planter and member of the Virginia Governor's Council, but died in 1637 when both his sons were boys, as would his son (this man's father). His parents also had two other sons (Thomas and John) and daughter (Cicely III) who survived infancy.

== Career ==
William Farrar owned 700 acres in Henrico County in 1704, probably including Farrar's Island, but in that year his brother Thomas owned 1444 acres in the same county, probably including 550 acres on Farrar's Island that he sold to Thomas Randolph of Tuckahoe in 1627, about the time that this man's eldest son and heir, William Farrar IV sold 686 acres to the same man, and moved to what in that year became Goochland County.

Meanwhile, in 1685 this man had followed his father's, uncle's and grandfather's public careers by becoming a justice of the peace for Henrico County, and in 1698 he became captain of the militia, as well as served as county sheriff in 1690-92 and 1712–1713. This William Farrar won election to the House of Burgesses in 1700, and served alongside Thomas Cocke, but two years later voters elected two different burgesses, William Randolph and Francis Epps, both likewise of the First Families of Virginia.

== Personal life, death and legacy ==
This William Farrar married twice. His first wife was Priscilla Baugh, daughter of William Baugh Jr. (whose widow Jane would remarry and made bequests to the three eldest as her grandchildren). They had sons (William IV, Abell and George) and daughter (Priscilla Jr.). By 1707 Farrar remarried to the widow Mary Tanner Ligon (widow of William Ligon), who on April 3, 1721, was named administrator of his estate.

== Death and legacy ==
He died in early 1721, with his widow Mary named to administer his estate, and his second son Abell sued later that year for debts owed to Henry Woodcokce. He was probably buried on Farrar's Island, but subsequent floods have obliterated the gravesite. In 1727, his brother Thomas Farrar as well as this man's eldest son (William Farrar IV) would sell Farrar's island to Thomas Randolph of Tuckahoe. William Farrar IV moved to Goochland County, which was officially formed that year in the area where his uncle Thomas was already living.

In modern times, Farrar's Island is part of the Dutch Gap Conservation Area and Henricus Historical Park, both administered by Chesterfield County, Virginia.
