= William Farrar Jr. =

Virginia planter and politician (born c. 1627)

William Ferrar II

Member Virginia House of Burgesses for Henrico County
- In office 1660–1676 Serving with Theodorick Bland, Francis Eppes
- Preceded by: William Hatcher
- Succeeded by: James Crewes

Personal details
- Born: c. 1627 Jordan Point, Colonial Virginia
- Died: January 1678 Farrar's Island, Henrico County, Colonial Virginia
- Spouse: Mary
- Relations: William Farrar(father), Cecily Jordan Farrar (mother), John (brother)
- Children: at least 3 sons, including William Farrar III and two daughters
- Occupation: Planter, militia officer, politician

Military service
- Branch/service: Henrico County, Virginia militia
- Rank: Captain

William Farrar Jr. (c. 1627 – January 1678) was a Virginia planter and politician who represented Henrico County in the House of Burgesses (1660–1676).

== Early life ==
The eldest son of William Farrar, who had married the widow Cecily (a/k/a Cisley) Jordan. His father had emigrated from England and became a planter and member of the Virginia Governor's Council, but died in 1637 when both his sons were boys. His parents also had another son (John) and daughter (Cicely Jr.) who survived infancy.

== Career ==
Because of primogeniture, William inherited his father's estate, including Farrar's Island. About 2000 acres was repatented in his name in June 1637, although he gave a parcel (about 200 acres) to his younger brother around 1649, and later in his will suggested John trade that parcel to benefit one of this man's three sons, which was accomplished in 1678. He and Thomas Ligon also purchased about 335 acres in 1664, but it appeared deserted in 1671 and was regranted to Henry Randolph.

By 1655, Farrar was captain of the local militia troop (all white men of that era being required to serve in the local militia), and in 1661 was captain of the company from Turkey Island Creek to the falls of the James River. By 1657 he was a justice of the peace for Henrico County, the justices jointly administering counties in that era. Tyler states that his final rank was "colonel".

William Farrar won election to the House of Burgesses at least twice: in 1660 as the only man representing rapidly growing (and then-vast) Henrico County, then the following year as one of the three men representing that county in 1661. The latter session became known as the "Long Assembly", because economic discontent due to very low tobacco prices after the English Civil War, as well as increased taxation and conflicts with displaced Native Americans led governors to not call for new elections colony-wide elections for fifteen years, which ended with elections in 1676 during Bacon's Rebellion).

== Personal life ==
William Farrar married a woman named Mary, who bore three sons (William Farrar III, Thomas Farrar and John Farrar, all of whom would reach adulthood, marry and have children) and daughters Martha (who would marry sometime sub-sheriff of Charles City County Walter Shipley) and Cicely.

== Death and legacy ==
He died around January 1678, with his widow Mary mentioned as administering his estate in 1682. The inventory of his estate appraises many household furnishings and livestock, as well as the remaining terms of one named female and three named male indentured servants, and two "Indian" boys named Will and Jacke (whose terms of service are never named and who are jointly appraised at £5600, whereas the two Englishmen with 5 years left apiece are appraised at £1800 apiece and 11 cows at £4400).

Farrar was probably buried on his land, which included a mainland section as well as Farrar's Island, but subsequent floods would have obliterated the gravesite. His younger brother John would be elected a burgess after suppression of Bacon's Rebellion, and may have supervised the education of his three nephews alongside the widow (who did not remarry), since John never married and bequeathed most of his property to this man's sons. Thomas, the middle son, may have been the most economically successful, owning 1444 acres in Henrico County in 1704, although his brother, the eldest son William Farrar III followed his father's and grandfather's career path into public service and politics. The youngest son, another John Farrar, married Temperance Brown Batte, widow of Thomas Batte and daughter of John Brown and his widow (the remarried) Sarah Woodson, who bequeathed land to her grandchildren. That John Farrar owned 600 acres in Henrico County in 1704 and was named administrator for his late wife Temperance in February 1721. This man's heir William Farrar IV would sell 686 acres of Farrar's Island to Thomas Randolph of Tuckahoe in 1727, within months of his uncle (this man's brother Thomas) selling another 550 acres of the island to the same man. Thomas Farrar had married Mary Ligon and was already living in the part of Henrico County known as St. James Parish which become Goochland County that year, and would later split into further counties).

In modern times, Farrar's Island is part of the Dutch Gap Conservation Area and Henricus Historical Park, both administered by Chesterfield County, Virginia.
