= Samuel Jordan =

Early settler, member of the Virginia Council, and Commissioner in the Virginia colony

Member Virginia House of Burgesses for Charles City County
- In office 1619–1619

Personal details
- Born: England
- Died: 1623 Jordan's Journey, Charles City County, Colonial Virginia
- Spouse: Cecily Jordan
- Occupation: Planter, militia officer, politician

Military service
- Branch/service: James City County, Virginia militia
- Years of service: About 1611 to 1622
- Rank: Captain
- Battles/wars: Second Anglo-Powhatan War

Samuel Jordan (died 1623) was an early settler and Ancient Planter of colonial Jamestown. He arrived in Virginia around 1610, and served as a Burgess in the first representative legislative session in North America. Jordan patented a plantation which he called "Beggar's Bush", which later became known as Jordan's Journey. It became a safe haven and stronghold for settlers during the Second Anglo-Powhatan War that ensued after the Powhatan surprise attack of 1622.

== Early life and arrival in New World ==
Samuel Jordan came to Virginia sometime around 1610, as his 1620 patent mentions him as having lived ten years in the colony.

Samuel Jordan's early life is uncertain. Alexander Brown suggests "he was probably married more than once". Some authors state that he had three sons from a first wife who were born in England: Robert, Samuel, and Thomas. Though the genealogist John Dorman does not mention either Robert or Samuel, he does acknowledge the possibility that Thomas Jordan, who arrived in Virginia at age 18 aboard Diana in 1619, could be Samuel's son from an earlier marriage in England; however, he points out there is no conclusive evidence to establish this relation.

== Role in Virginia government ==
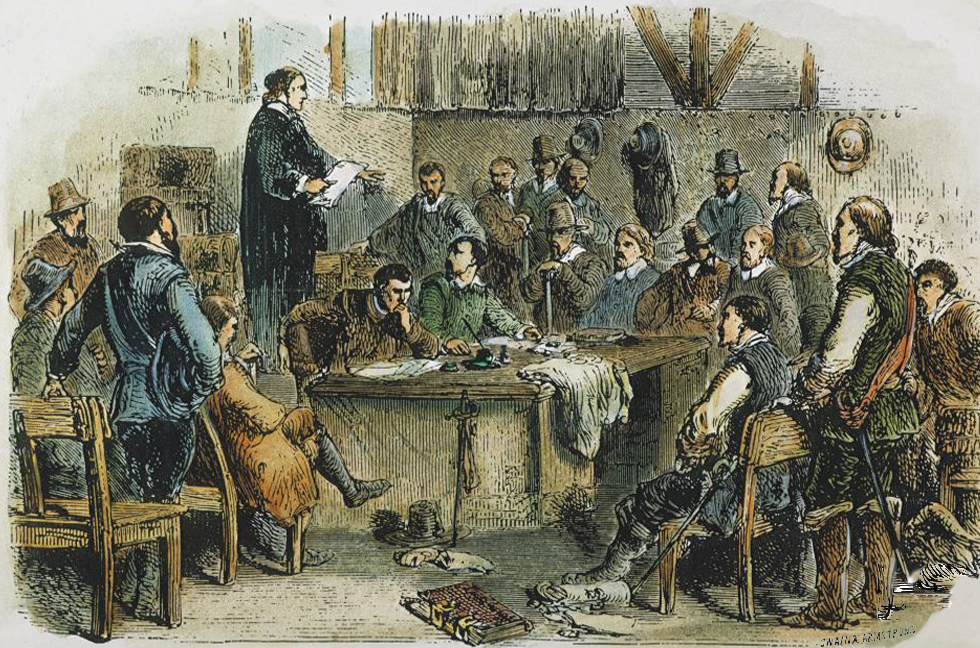
Thomas Armstrong's illustration of the First Assembly in Virginia, which Samuel Jordan attended.

When Deputy-Governor George Yeardley called the first representative legislative assembly in Virginia in 1619, Jordan served as a Burgess on behalf of Charles City. During this first meeting, Jordan also served on the committee of readers for the Great Charter, which been recently received from the Virginia Company and had authorized the assembly. As a privilege granted by the Great Charter, Jordan also became an ancient planter, which entitled him to 100 acres of land.

== Marriage to Cecily ==
Sometime before 1620, Jordan married Cecily, who had arrived in Virginia around 1611 and was around 18 when they married. (Note: Based on Jamestown muster of 1625, which gives Cecily's age as 24 at the time.) By 1621, their first daughter Mary had been born, and when Jordan died in 1623, Cecily was pregnant with her second daughter, Margaret.

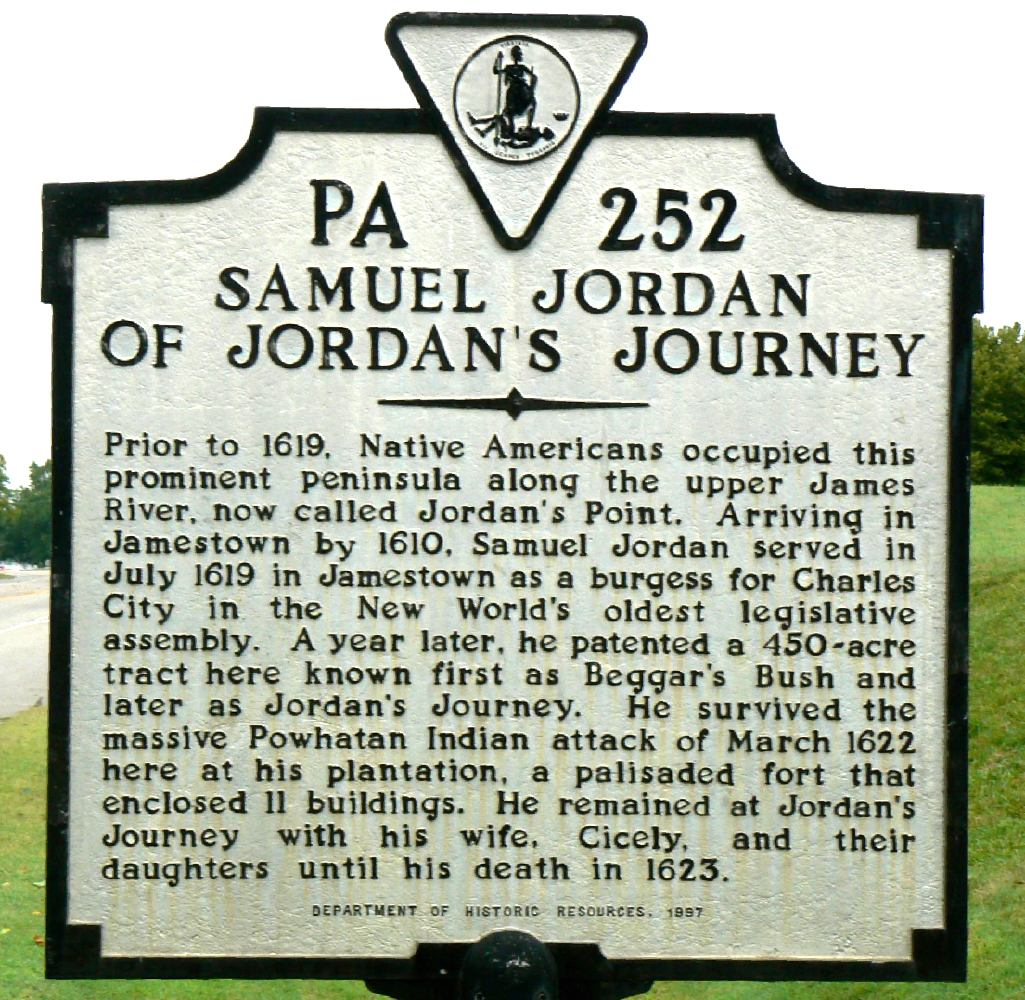
Virginia Historical Highway Marker of Jordan's Journey

In 1620, Samuel Jordan officially received his patent for 450 acres of land. (Note: The patent was not entered into the record until 1690 when Richard Bland had acquired the property.) This patent included 200 acres for both his and Cecily's claim as ancient planters, as well as an additional 250 acres as headright for paying the transportation costs to Virginia for five indentured servants. Jordan's patent, located at today's Jordan Point, Virginia, was originally known as Beggars Bush and later as Jordan's Journey.

When the Mamanatowick, Opechancanough of the Powhatan Confederacy launched the surprise attack of 1622 that killed nearly a third of the English colonists and triggered the Second Anglo-Powhatan War, nobody from Jordan's Journey was listed as killed. Jordan's Journey withstood the attack and became a fortified refuge. After the initial assault, many of the outlying settlements were temporarily abandoned, and most of the colonists were ordered to move to a small number of relatively safer settlements, one of which was Jordan's Journey. As a result, Jordan's Journey grew. In February 1624, 42 people were living at Jordan's Journey; a year later, 56 people were living there.

== Death and legacy ==
Samuel Jordan died sometime before mid-February 1623, (Note: Archaeologists who excavated Jordan's Journey have speculated that one of the more elaborate graves adjacent to the main residence containing the remains of a man between 35 and 39 may be Samuel Jordan's. If this is the case, Jordan was most likely born c. 1584-1588.) as his name does not appear among living at Jordan's Journey in a list submitted to the Virginia Company that month.

Soon after his burial, his widow Cecily Jordan became involved in the first breach-of-promise dispute in North America. The lawsuit was filed by Rev. Greville Pooley, who had proposed marriage to the widow three days after the funeral. Cecily Jordan ultimately won the case, then in 1625 married William Farrar, who was bonded to execute Samuel Jordan's will. Rev. Pooley took the case to the Virginia Council, claiming his proposal had initially been accepted but in 1625 formally forswore any claim against her. The outcome of this dispute not only determined who would marry Cecily, but also who would ultimately have say over the management of Jordan's property. Even though William Farrar had married Cecily, the lists of patents sent back to England still listed Jordan's Journey as owned by the Jordan family. Farrar eventually acquired his own rights to a 2000-acre patent on Farrar's Island at the site of what had previously been Henricus. Historian Martha McCartney suggests Jordan's Journey may have remained with one or both of Jordan's daughters, but their fates are not recorded.
