= Nathaniel Courthope =

Nathaniel Courthope (born 1585;– died c. October 20, 1620) (sometimes written Courthopp) was an English East India Company officer involved in the wars with the Dutch over the spice trade.

== Life ==
He was of the wealthy cloth-maker Courthope family of Goddard's Green in Cranbrook, Kent, the son of Alexander Courthope and brother of the Peter Courthope who bought Danny House in Hurstpierpoint, Sussex, and who was painted by Cornelius Johnson. He was left £200 in his father's will.

On 13 November 1609, Courthope was hired by the East India Company to go to the Spice Islands. He left England with great fanfare and by 1616 was a factor at Sukadana in Borneo.

In 1614 he was accused of purloining company resources and other offences by one dying man named, Edward Langley.

On 25 December 1616, he landed his ships, Swan and Defence, on the island known as Run, the smallest (about 2 by 2.5 miles (3.2 km × 4.0 km)) of the Banda Islands, in a quest to break the Dutch hold on the nutmeg supply. He persuaded the islanders to enter an alliance with the British for nutmeg. After losing his two ships to mutiny and sinking by the Dutch, he fortified the island by erecting forts to overlook approaches from the east. With 39 men and the natives, with scarce food and water (springs of which the island is devoid of) supply, he proceeded to hold off a siege of the Dutch - who outnumbered them considerably - for over 1,540 days.

Despite numerous letters from the Company's directors allowing Courthope to leave his post, and even awarding him repeatedly for his efforts, he never gave in. Even after the fleet of Sir Thomas Dale sent from England to Run had been defeated by the Dutch governor of the archipelago, Jan Pieterszoon Coen, the decision never changed.

He was shot by the Dutch, who awaited him at night having received their spy's message, while rowing towards a nearby island in a small boat with several of his men in order to support resistance of the natives and to prepare them for a rebellion. Noticing the trap, he leapt into the sea and swam for it, dying en route.

The English departed without a struggle shortly after Courthope's death and their local allies - who considered themselves to be under His Majesty's reign - were being oppressed.

Thanks to Courthope's defence of the island however, Britain was able to barter its legal title to the island of Run with the Dutch, for another island by the name of Manhattan.
