= Dutch Gap Canal =

Canal in Virginia, United States

- canal
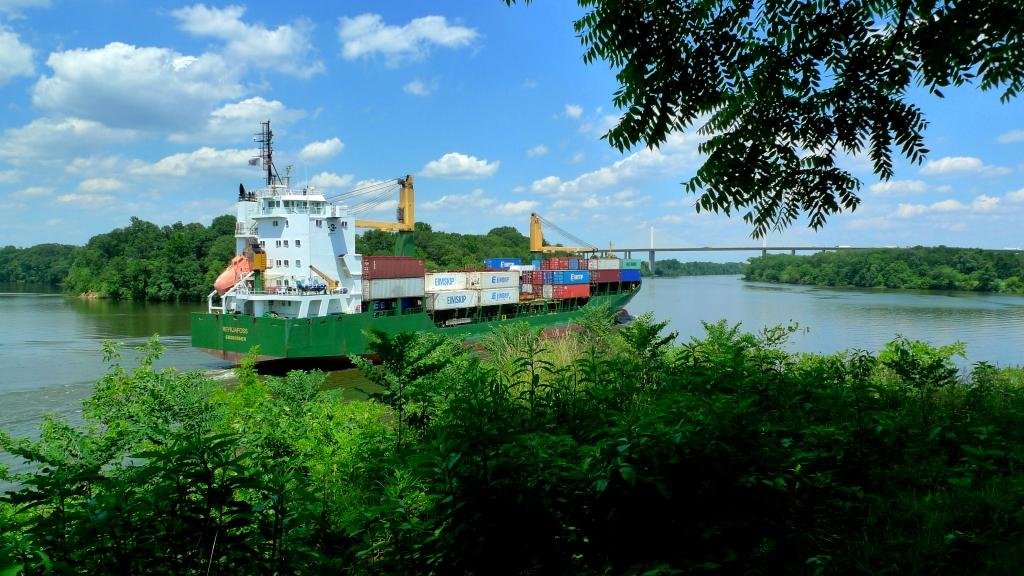
- The container ship Reykjafoss on the Dutch Gap Canal heading downstream from Richmond towards Hampton Roads.

- Location in Virginia Dutch Gap Canal (the United States)
- Coordinates: 37.377230°N 77.358698°W
- Location: Chesterfield County, Virginia

Dutch Gap Canal is located on the James River in Chesterfield County, Virginia just north of the lost 17th-century town of Henricus. The canal's construction was initiated by Union forces during the American Civil War to bypass a meander loop of the river around a peninsula known as Farrar's Island that was controlled by Confederate artillery. The canal was completed after the war and is now the main channel of the James River in this area. Today, the area south of the canal is the location of the Dutch Gap Conservation Area and Henricus Historical Park.

== Origin of Name ==
The Dutch Gap Canal was named for its location at Dutch Gap, which was formerly a neck of land that joined Farrar's Island to the mainland. The James River around Farrar's Island, from Drewry's Bluff to the confluence of the Appomattox River below Bermuda Hundred, originally had a number of meandering loops. The Dutch Gap was the isthmus between the narrowest of these loops. Here, the James River on the west bank of the isthmus created what was called the "Seven Mile Loop" (Note: General Peter Smith Michie, the engineer in charge of building the Dutch Gap Canal states the portion of the James River loop actually bypassed by the canal was 4.75 miles) that formed Farrar's Island before returning to the east bank. However, the distance between the east and west banks at this point was less than 200 yards wide. and the elevation ranged from 3 feet to 39 feet above the level of the river.

The name "Dutch Gap" has been historically associated with the founding of Henricus by the Virginia Company of London in 1611 by Sir Thomas Dale, and it was also known as "Dale's Dutch Gap". The name is attributed to a palisaded fosse that Dale is thought to have built across the neck to protect the town from attack on the north side of the river. It is claimed to have been named the "Dutch Gap" because Dale is thought to have learned the fortification technique when he served as a mercenary for the Dutch Republic prior to his employment with the Virginia Company. (Note: Some sources have given an alternative account for Dutch Gap's name, stating that it came from early Dutch or German settlers starting an unfinished canal. However, there is no evidence of non-English settlers forming a community near Henrico.) Between 1619 and 1624, Dutch Gap was part of the City of Henrico. In 1637, it became part of a patent claimed as an inheritance by the son of councillor and commissioner, William Farrar. As a result of this patent, the land enclosed by the loop of the James just below Dutch Gap eventually got its name, Farrar's Island.

== Civil War History ==
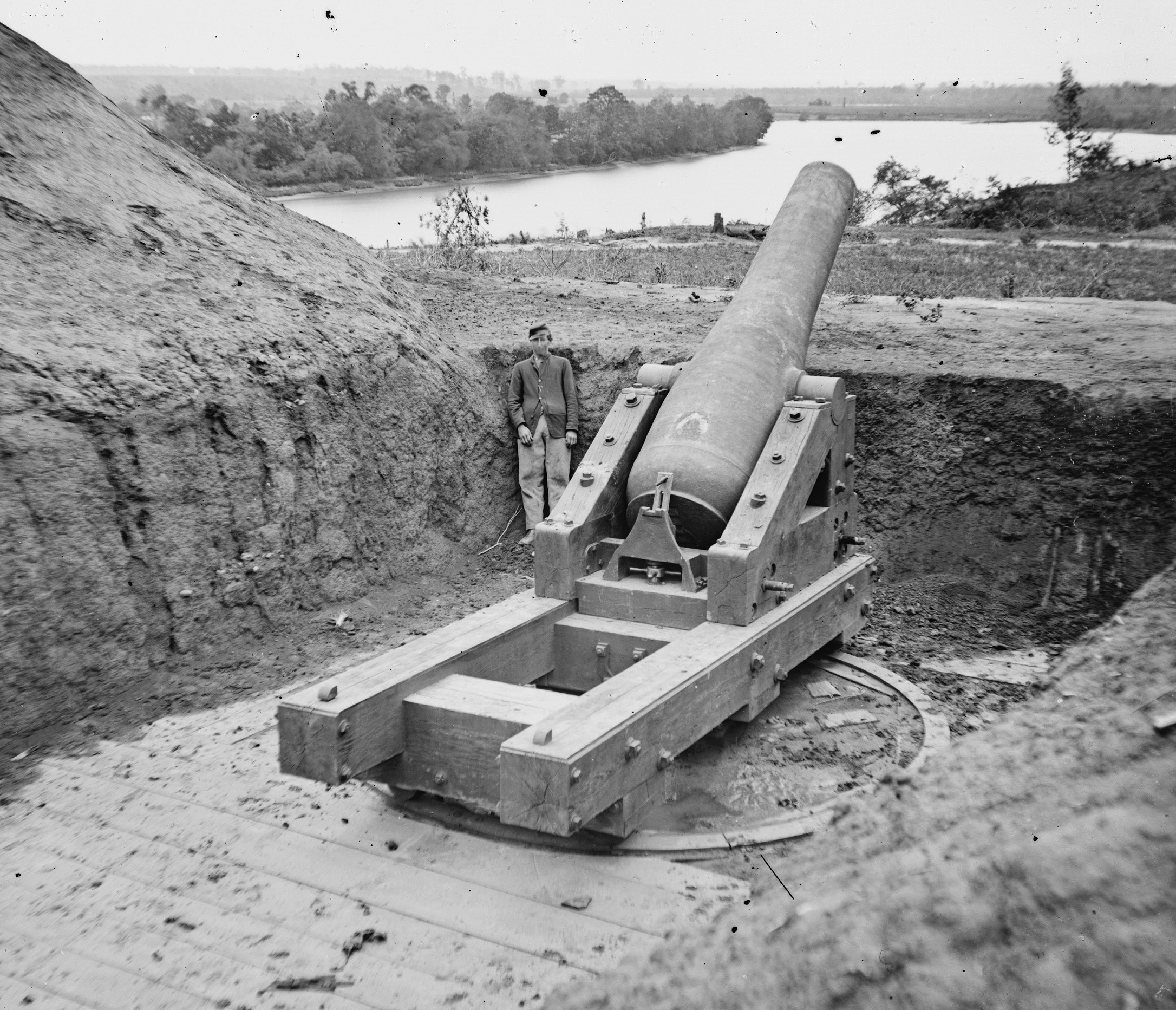
Confederate Columbiad overlooking Farrar's Island

During the American Civil War in late August, 1864, Major General Benjamin Butler, commander of the Union Army of the James, ordered the construction of a canal at Dutch Gap. One purpose of the canal was to allow ships to bypass the loop of the James river around Farrar's Island, which was controlled by Confederate batteries. Of particular threat was Battery Dantzler at the northern end of the Howlett Line where Confederate forces had installed two seven-inch Brooke rifles, two ten-inch Columbiad guns, and two siege mortars that had a half mile field of fire on the James River that lay on the east side of Farrar's Island. Another purpose was to continue military activity as part of the larger Petersburg Campaign to ensure that Confederate manpower resources remained strained in Eastern Virginia and unable to redeploy to other sectors.

Due to the geography of the area, the canal was dug just south of the narrowest point of Dutch Gap, and was about 175 yards long when completed. The construction was often performed under fire, as batteries from both sides engaged in daily duels. At times, the Confederate artillery was effective in slowing down the rate of construction with indirect fire, as when it sank the Union dredge being used to deepen the canal. In January 1865, the cut across the isthmus was complete, but the explosion used to remove the bulkhead to open the canal threw much of the bulkhead's earth back into the canal. Dredging had to continue to the end of the war and the canal remained unusable for armed ships.

=== Role of African-Americans at the Dutch Gap Canal ===
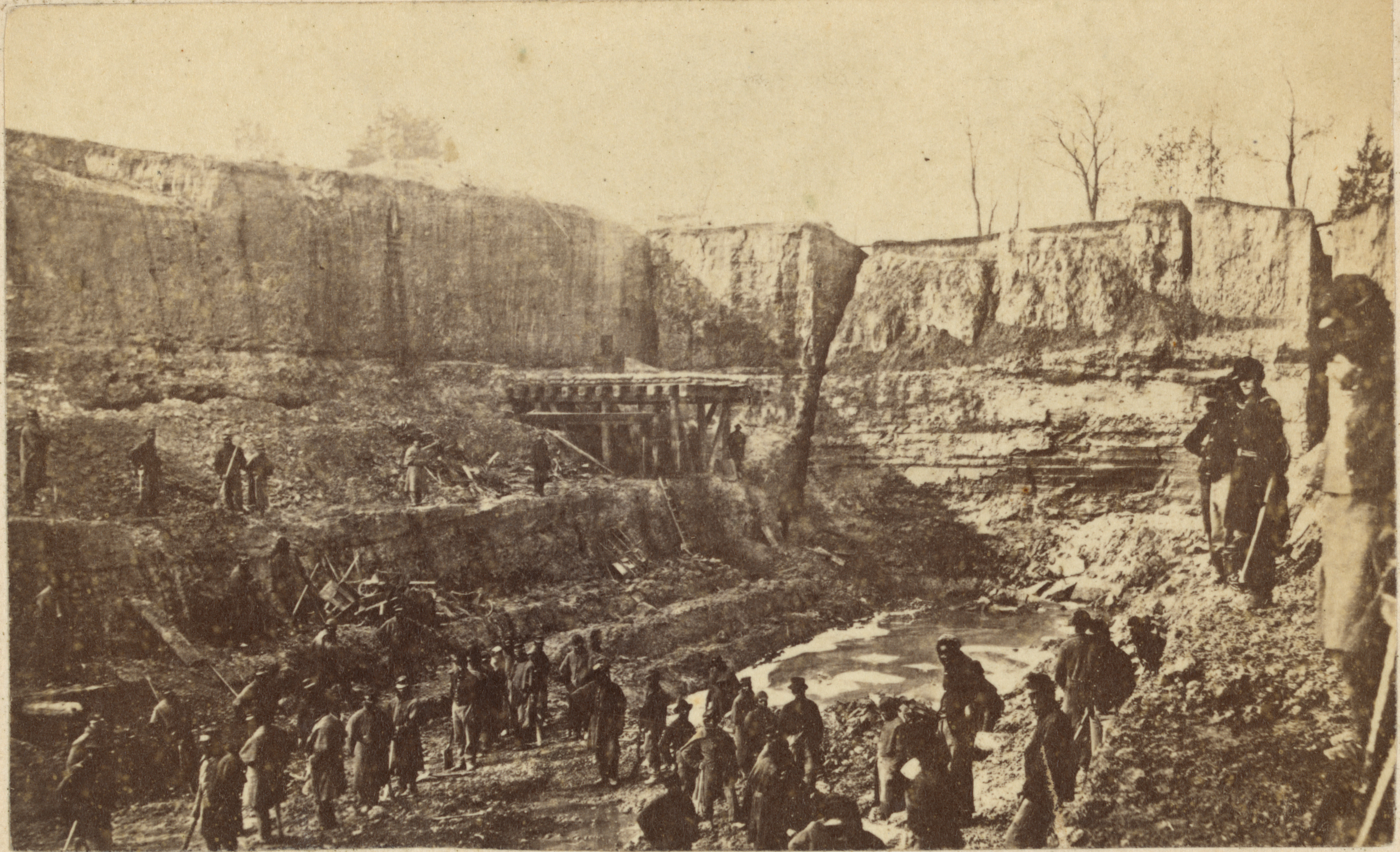
Soldiers from the United States Colored Troops excavating the Dutch Gap Canal

The greater part of the construction of the Dutch Gap Canal was done by United States Colored Troops (USCT), many of whom were freedmen. Up to 40% of the personnel in the Army of the James were in USCT units, which was the highest percent of any command military in the Civil War. At least seven USCT infantry regiments were engaged in military, excavation and fatigue duties specifically related to action at Dutch Gap. In general, the Union army often treated the men of USCT units as second-class citizens relegating them primarily to fatigue duty, and this was also a concern during the building of the Dutch Gap Canal. However, the Army of the James was noteworthy in striving to ensure that soldiers in USCT units were treated similarly to other soldiers in the army. Initially, General Butler recruited both African-American and white soldiers for excavation duty for the canal, which required 7 and a half hours of hard labor daily; but all volunteers were compensated by pay that nearly doubled their salary and a daily ration of whiskey or its cash equivalent.

However, Butler underestimated the time and resources needed to complete the canal, and he had abandoned the volunteer system and sought labor from other sources. This additional need often led to inequities in the treatment of men USCT units, who were frequently assigned more fatigue duties than white soldiers. The need to acquire labor for the canal created other inequities, including the treatment of African-American laborers from the Freedmen's Colony of Roanoke Island. Initially, these men had been freed by Union forces, but then they unwillingly taken from North Carolina and impressed into service excavating the canal. They wrote a letter protesting their impressment and their not receiving promised pay. Due to their protest, the freedmen did eventually get paid; however, their compensation as civilian laborers was small and less regular than men doing similar work in the USCT units

=== Dutch Gap Canal Affair ===
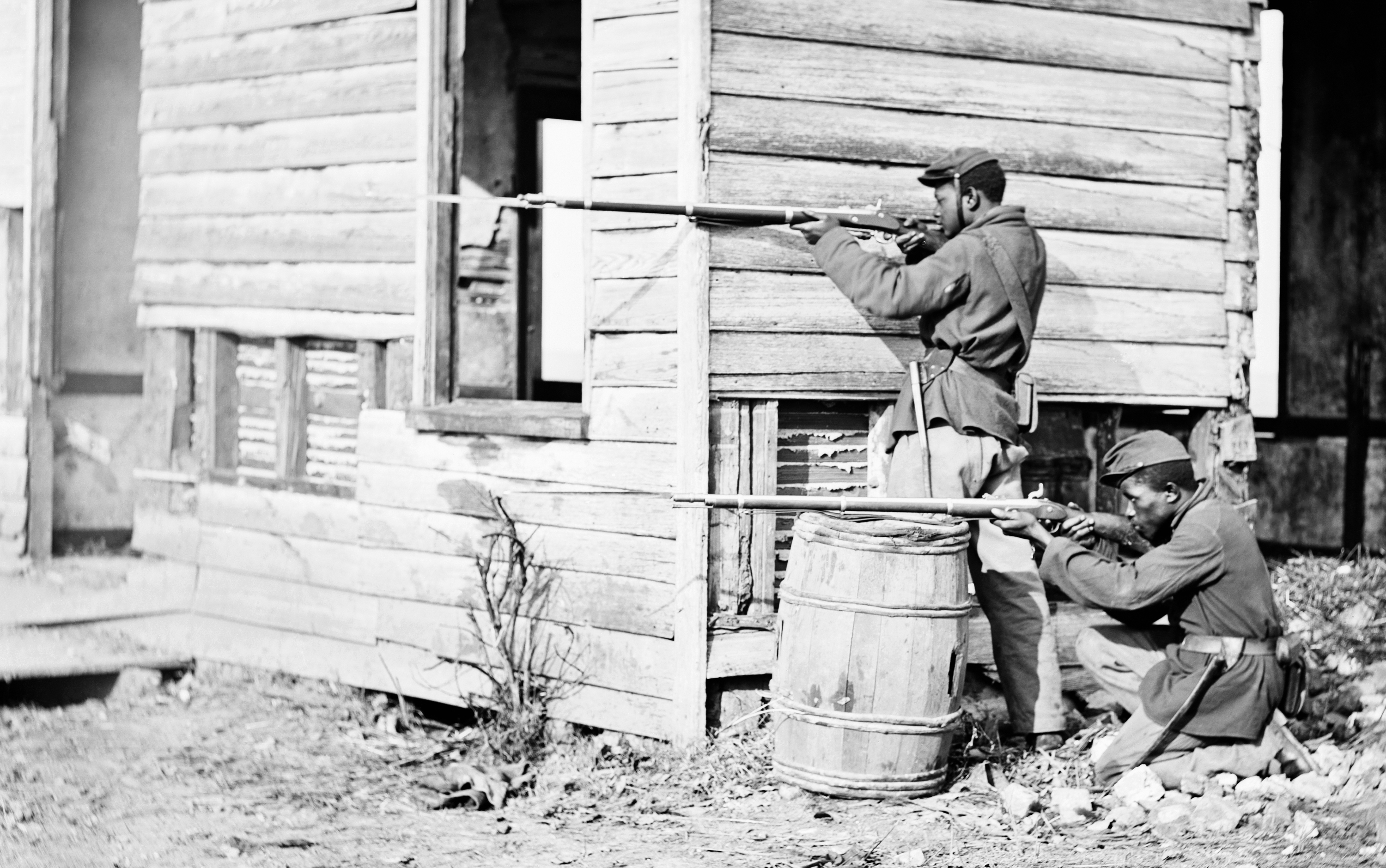
Soldiers from a United States Colored Troops unit on picket duty at Dutch Gap

The Dutch Gap Canal also became a focal point for negotiating the treatment of black soldiers captured by the Confederates during the Petersburg Campaign. In 1863, A joint resolution by the Confederate Congress declared captured black soldiers agents of servile insurrection who were subject to execution or enslavement. (Note: The joint resolution also declared captured white officers of USCT units subject to execution.) In response, the Lincoln administration ordered that an equal number of Confederate soldiers be put to death for each black soldier executed and that for every black soldier enslaved, a Confederate soldier forced into menial labor. In October 1864, When Benjamin Butler found out that captured black Union soldiers were being enslaved to build Confederate emplacements that were under Union artillery bombardment, he ordered Confederate prisoners to be forced to work on the Dutch Gap Canal even as it was being bombarded by Confederate artillery. In response to Butler's action, General Robert E. Lee informed General Ulysses S. Grant a week later that captured African-American soldiers who were not originally freedmen would be treated as regular prisoners of war. Lee also informed Grant that captured African-American soldiers were no longer working on the fortifications; in turn, Grant ordered Butler to release the Confederates from digging the canal.

== Post-Civil War Development ==
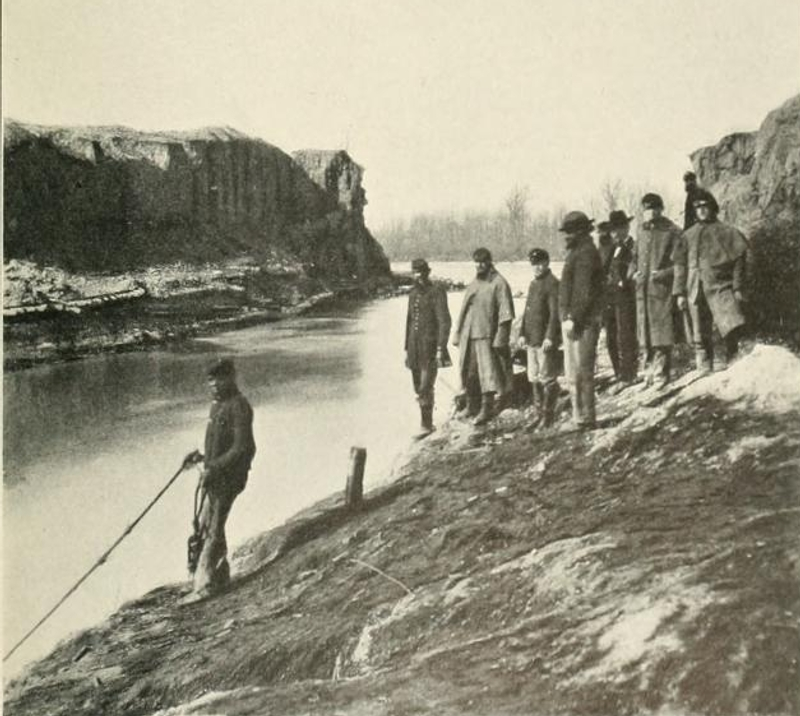
Completed canal as it looked in April 1865

Even during the Civil War, the positive economic impact of the canal on water transportation to Richmond was foreseen. However, immediately after the war, the canal was so undeveloped that it was called a "One Horse Ditch" by one traveler. Even so, the commercial potential of the Dutch Gap Canal was demonstrated when the steamer Clyde passed through it on a journey from Fort Monroe to Richmond in May 1865. Nevertheless, the canal remained undeveloped for the next five years because the owner of Farrar's Island filled in the canal's northern end to create a causeway; however, a flood in 1870 washed out the causeway, allowing the canal to be further developed and converted into the main channel of the James River. After 1871, improvements to the canal, such as deepening and widening, began under the oversight of the Army Corps of Engineers, and continued at least through to the end of the 1870s. The challenges with improving the canal and the rest of the James River to accommodate larger ships may have played a role in hindering Richmond's post-Civil War development as an inland port.

In the twentieth century, the canal was further improved. By 1916, the channel of the James, including the Dutch Gap Canal, was 22 feet deep; since 1940, it had obtained its current depth of 25 feet. Currently, the canal's commercial traffic consists of primarily of container barges and feeder ships transporting goods between Hampton Roads and Richmond.

== Dutch Gap Canal and Paleobotany ==
The excavation of the Dutch Gap Canal exposed an accessible area of Potomac Formation, which contains many fossils dating to the Cretaceous period has made it a site for the study of paleobotany In 2013, the fossil of a previously unknown flowering plant, Potomacapnos apeleutheron from the Early Cretaceous age was discovered. This fossil may be one of the earliest eudicots found in North America, as the geological deposits it was embedded in were about 120 million years old. The ancient flowering plant was named, Potomacapnos apeleutheron, in honor of the freedmen who dug the canal: Potomacapnos defines the area where the fossil was found apeleutheron is the Greek for freedmen.

== Dutch Gap Canal Area Today ==
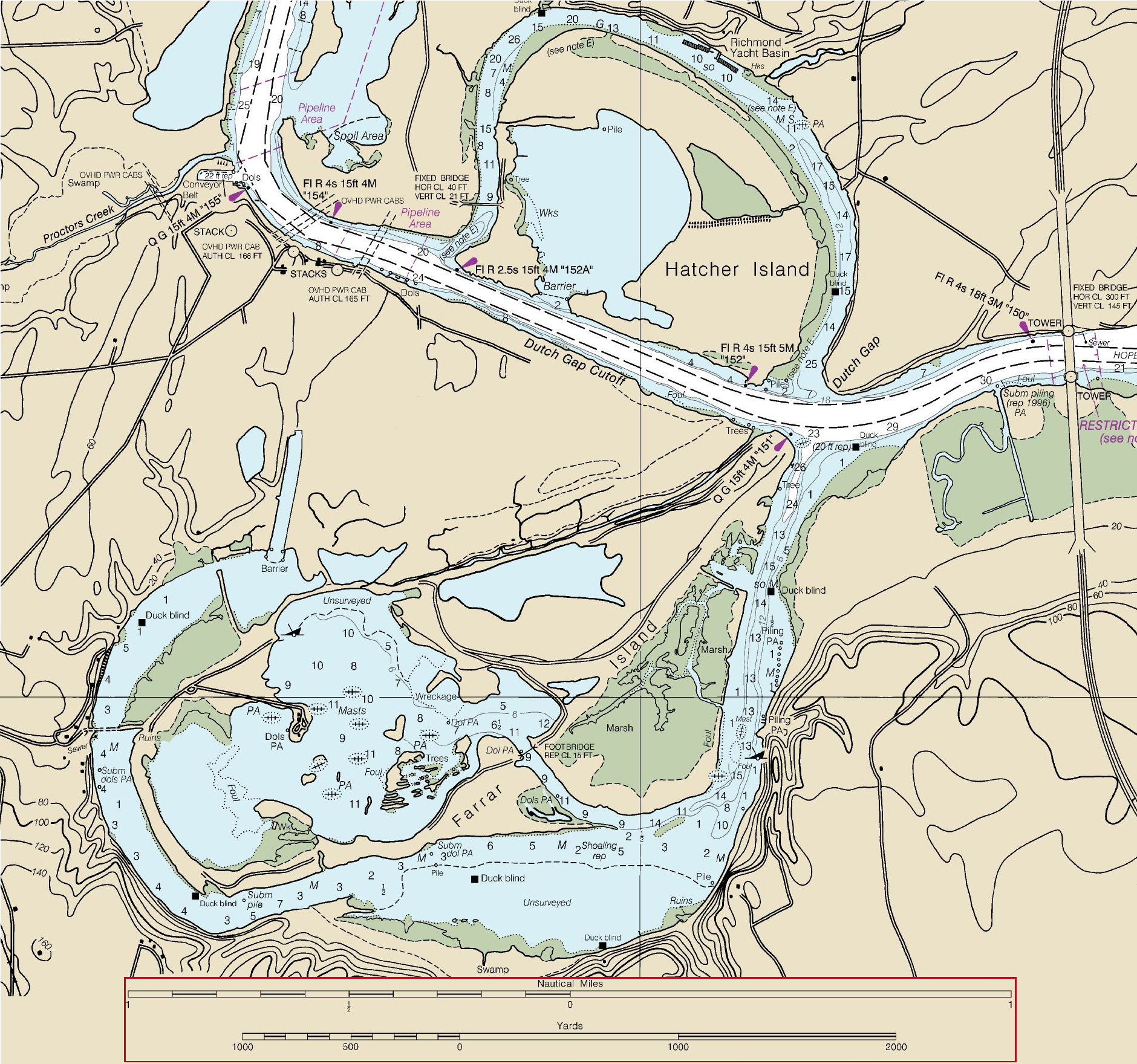
Contemporary map of Dutch Gap Canal and surrounding waterways

Farrar's Island, which is just south of the Dutch Gap Canal, is now the site of the Dutch Gap Conservation Area and Boat Landing and the Henricus Historical Park. An electricity-generating facility owned by Dominion Energy is located nearby on the south shore of the James River near an extension of the canal, the Dutch Gap Cutoff, that created Hatcher Island out of another, wider bend.
