= Dale's Pale Archeological District =

Archaeological site in Virginia, United States

- U.S. National Register of Historic Places
- U.S. Historic district
- Virginia Landmarks Register
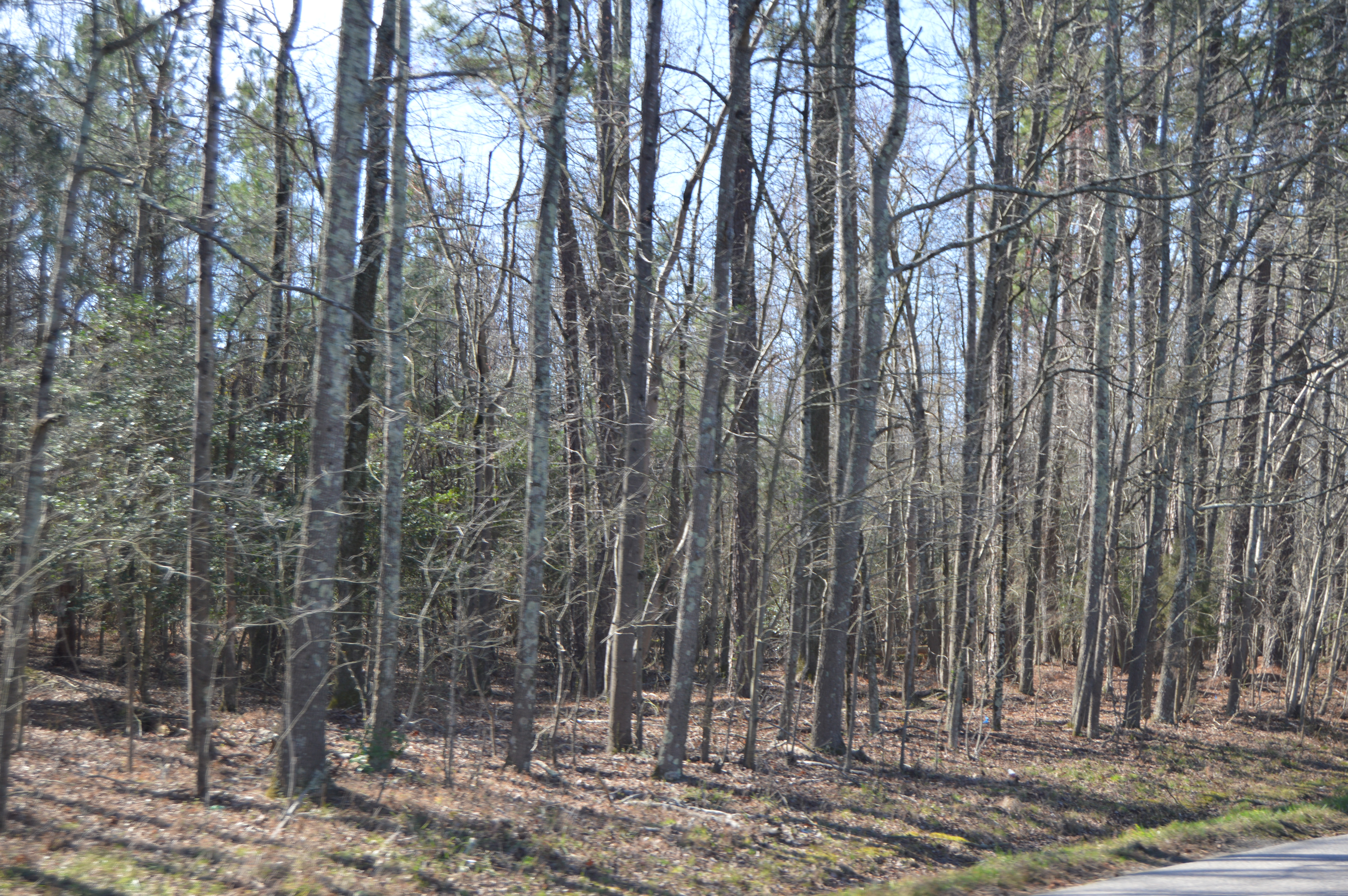
- Part of the site, along Bermuda Hundred Road
- Location: South shore of James R., Chesterfield County Park, Chester, Virginia
- Area: 158 acres (64 ha)
- MPS: Prehistoric through Historic Archeological and Architectural Resources at Bermuda Hundred MPS
- NRHP reference No.: 06001012
- VLR No.: 020-5371

Significant dates
- Added to NRHP: January 19, 2007
- Designated VLR: September 6, 2006

Dale's Pale Archeological District is a set of historic archaeological sites and national historic district located near Chester, Chesterfield County, Virginia. The district consists of a collection of four county owned archaeological sites. They are the location of a defensive palisade built by Sir Thomas Dale in 1613 around the original settlement at Bermuda Hundred, which he founded. It is a two mile long, berm-and-ditch feature, running between the high banks overlooking the James and Appomattox Rivers. The other sites within the district include a Middle Woodland Period (500 BC– AD 200) settlement, and a late 17th- or early 18th-century house with its associated dump.

It was listed on the National Register of Historic Places in 2007.
