= William Farrar (councillor) =

Early settler, member of the Virginia Council, and Commissioner in the Virginia colony

Member of the Council of Virginia
- In office 1626–1632

Personal details
- Born: April 1583 Croxton, Lincolnshire, England
- Died: c. 1637 (aged c. 54) Virginia
- Spouse: Cecily Jordan
- Occupation: planter and politician

William Farrar (April 1583 – c. 1637) was a planter, politician, and real estate investor in colonial Virginia who served on the Virginia Governor's Council. A subscriber to the third charter of the Virginia Company, Farrar immigrated to the colony from England in 1618. After surviving the Jamestown massacre of 1622, Farrar moved to Jordan's Journey. In the following year, Farrar became involved in North America's first breach of promise case when he proposed to Samuel Jordan's widow, Cecily, who was allegedly engaged to another man. In 1624, the case was dropped, and Farrar and Cecily married.

In March 1626, Farrar was appointed to the Council of Virginia where he advised the royal governor of Colonial Jamestown. Later that year he was named a commissioner (i.e., magistrate) for the monthly courts of the colony's "upper parts", with jurisdiction over Charles City and the City of Henrico. In these roles, Farrar voiced the early planters' interest as the colony transitioned from being managed by the Virginia Company and became a royal colony under Charles I of England.

Farrar was also on the council when it arrested Governor John Harvey for misgovernance and forced his temporary return to England. By the time of his death around 1637, Farrar had sold off his remaining assets in England and established rights to a 2000-acre patent on Farrar's Island, located on a curl of the James River, which was claimed by his son William Farrar Jr.

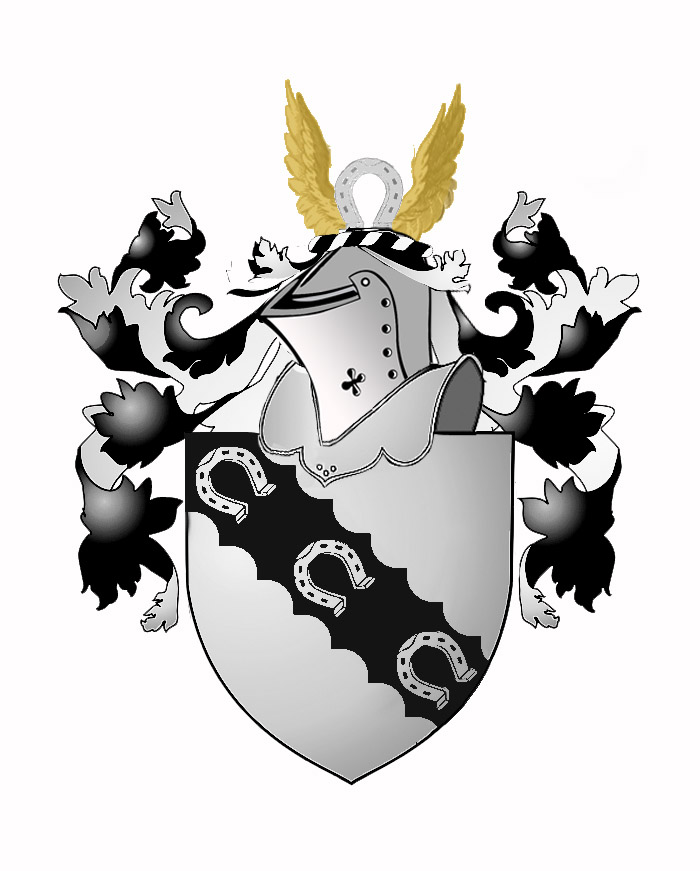
The arms of William Farrar's father, John Farrar of Croxton and London, Esquire

== Background ==
William Farrar was born before April 28, 1583, the date of his christening, in Croxton, Lincolnshire, England. He was the 3rd son of John Farrar of Croxton and London, Esquire, a wealthy merchant and landowner with various holdings in West Yorkshire, Lincolnshire, and Hertfordshire, and Cecily Kelke, an heiress and direct descendant of Edward III of England. The nineteenth-century historian of Virginia, Alexander Brown, states that while in England, William Farrar received an education in law. (Note: Brown may be referring to William Ferrar, a younger brother of John and Nicholas Ferrar. Farrar was mistakenly identified as William Ferrar until the twentieth century. The brother of Nicholas and John was born around 1590, went to Cambridge, studied law at Middle Temple in London and became a barrister in 1618.)

== Relation to the Virginia Company and immigration to the New World ==
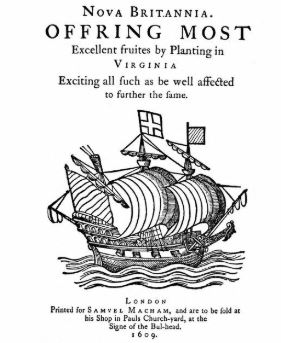
Facsimile cover of "Nova Britannia", a tract from Farrar's time used to recruit people to Virginia.

When Farrar went to Virginia, it was still part of the Virginia Company of London, a joint-stock company, sanctioned by Royal Charter. Farrar was a subscriber to the Third Charter of the Virginia Company, where his name appears as "William Ferrers". His subscription consisted of three shares that were bought for a total of £37 10s (equivalent to about $12,600 today). (Note: For another comparison of the share's value, the entire annual wages of a skilled journeyman in London around 1588 was authorized to be between £4 and £10.) Farrar also had family interests in the Virginia Company as two of his second cousins, the brothers John Ferrar and Nicholas Ferrar, played key roles in the managing the company's interests.

Farrar left London on Neptune on March 16, 1617/18 (Note: Dual dating is given because the English new year did not begin until March 25 during Farrar's lifetime. See article on Old Style and New Style Dates for details.) along with Virginia's governor, Thomas West, Baron De La Warr. De La Warr had been commissioned by the Virginia Company to return to the colony with fresh people and supplies to help it achieve political and economic stability, but he died en route. When Farrar arrived in August 1618, news of the governor's death threw Jamestown into turmoil, Deputy Governor Samuel Argall, who was already unpopular with many colonists, was accused of mismanagement and the unauthorized misappropriation of Neptune's passengers and cargo. After a prolonged series of accusations from both the Virginia Company and colonists against Argall's governing, he finally stepped down in April 1619.

In June 1619, the Virginia Company instructed that 40 indentured servants be put at the disposal of Farrar when they arrived in Virginia. (Note: It's unclear that Farrar was the intended recipient. William Ferrar, brother of John and Nicholas Ferrar, also went to Virginia in 1619, but died at sea or shortly after his arrival.) The payment for the cost of transporting these colonists would have resulted in a 2000-acre headright at 50 acres a head. However, Garland never arrived in Jamestown because it was damaged in a hurricane while en route. Instead of proceeding to Virginia, the Garland's captain, William Wye left the remaining passengers in Bermuda and sailed the repaired ship directly back to England.

As his personal headright, Farrar received a land patent for 100 acres on the Appomattox River close to where it flows into the James River, near what is now known as Hopewell, Virginia. In the meantime, the resultant legal suits between Wye and the Virginia Company regarding the financial responsibility for the Garland fiasco were not resolved until the end of 1622, when Farrar had already quit residence at his patent as a result of the Powhatan surprise attack of 1621/22.

== Move to Jordan's Journey and marriage ==
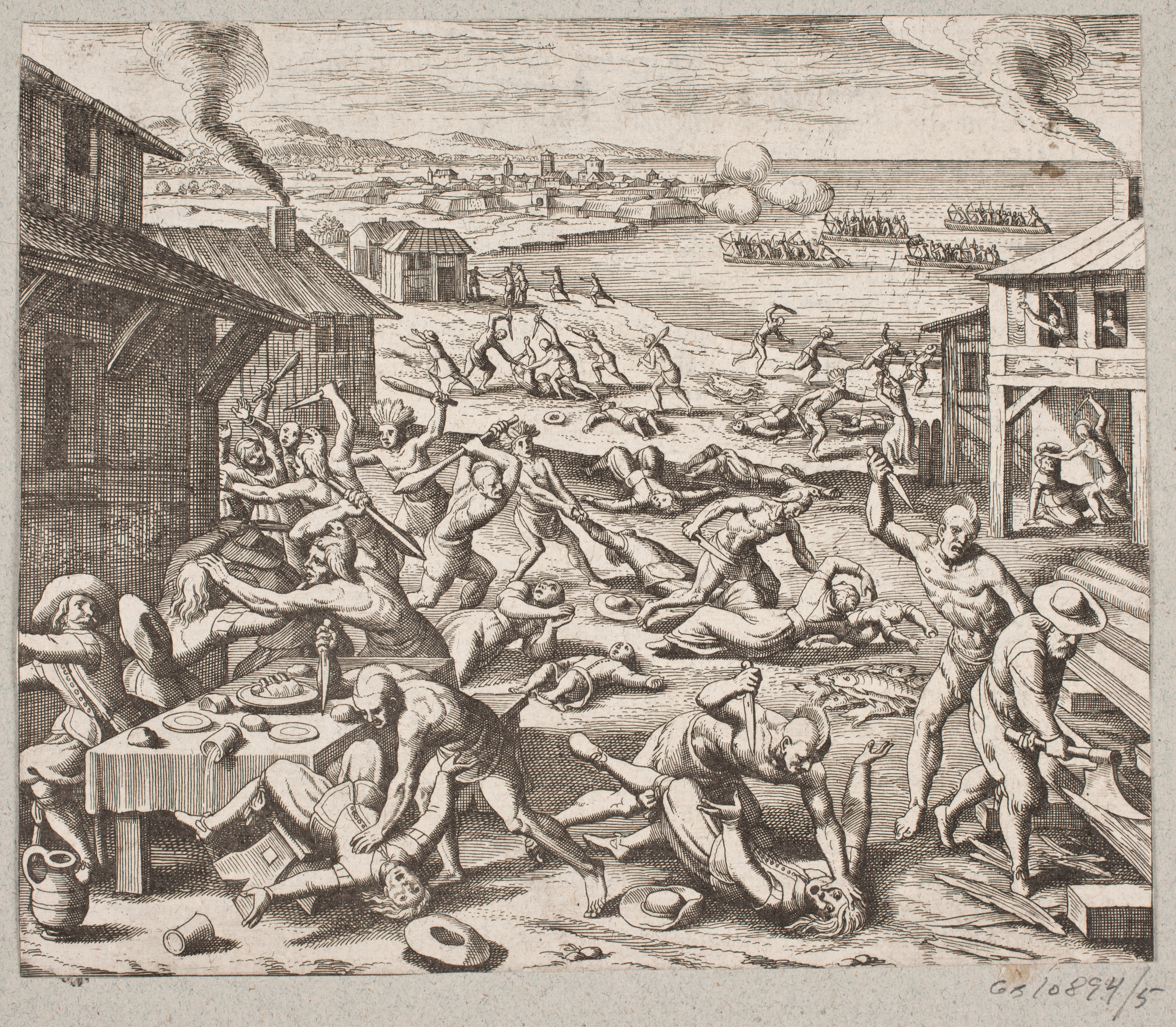
The Indian massacre of 1622, in which 10 colonists at Farrar's patent were killed

On March 22, 1622, the Powhatan launched a surprise attack on the colony. Ten settlers on Farrar's land on the Appomattox River were killed. However, Farrar survived and got to Samuel Jordan's settlement at Beggars Bush, part of the plantation known as Jordan's Journey. After the attack, William Farrar stayed at Jordan's Journey, which had become a fortified rallying place for the survivors.

Samuel Jordan died before June 1623. Sometime afterward, Farrar proposed marriage to Jordan's pregnant widow, Cecily, which involved him in the first breach of promise suit filed in North America. Reverend Greville Pooley claimed he had first proposed marriage three or four days after Samuel Jordan had died and Cecily had accepted. However, Cecily denied his proposal and accepted Farrar's, which resulted in Pooley filing the suit. The case continued for almost two years. During the suit, Alexander Brown suggests that Farrar may have acted as Cecily's legal representative. Eventually, Pooley signed an agreement in January 1624/5 that acquitted Cecily Jordan of her alleged former promises.

Even as the case was ongoing, William Farrar and Cecily Jordan continued to work together at Jordan's Journey. In November 1623, Farrar was bonded to execute Samuel Jordan's will regarding the management of his estate and Cecily Jordan was warranted to put down the security to guarantee Farrar's bondage. During this time, "Farrar assumed the role of plantation 'commander' or 'head of hundred'" for Jordan's Journey. A year later, the Jamestown muster of 1624/25 lists "fferrar William mr & Mrs. Jordan"[sic] as sharing the head of a Jordan's Journey household with three daughters and ten manservants. During this time, Jordan's Journey prospered. By May 1625 Farrar and Jordan were finally married, as it was then that Farrar was released from his bond to Jordan's estate.They had three children together: Cecily (born 1625), William (c. 1627), (Note: William Farrar II's godfather was Captain Thomas Pawlett of Westover, who also arrived in Virginia in 1618 on the Neptune) and John (c. 1632).

== Roles in the royal colony ==
On March 14, 1625/6, William Farrar was appointed councillor to the Council of Virginia by Charles I of England. Farrar held this position, which entitled him as an esquire of Virginia, until at least 1635 when Governor John Harvey was deported.

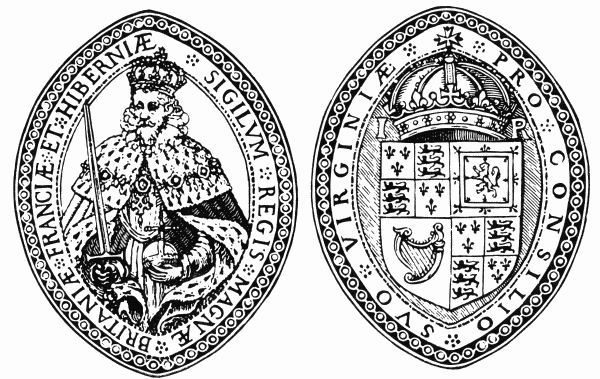
Seal of "His Majesties Council of Virginia", the symbol of Farrar and the other councillors' role in Virginia's governance.

Farrar became a councillor during a period of uncertainty for the colonists. The 1619 Great Charter of the Virginia Company had established self-governance through the Virginia Assembly, but James I dissolved the charter in 1624, and put the colony under direct royal authority. Just before James I died in March 1625, Charles I announced his intention to be the sole factor of his royal colonies. To this end, he commissioned a new structure, consisting of a governor, Sir George Yeardley, and 13 councillors, including William Farrar, to govern the royal colony on behalf of the Crown's interest. Because the assembly was not included in the commission, the Council was the only legal body representing the interests of the Virginia planters. This state of affairs continued until the petitions of the colonists allowed the continuance of the House of Burgesses and the re-convention of the Virginia Assembly in 1628. The Council also functioned as the highest court in Virginia and as the advisory board to the governor regarding the creation of legislative acts. Just as importantly, the members of the Council could determine the fate of the governor. Farrar was on the Council when it elected John Pott as governor in 1628. He was also on the Council when it temporarily deported Governor Harvey in 1635. Harvey's silencing of Farrar when he questioned the governor's proceedings with the council initiated the protest that eventually led to the governor's arrest and expulsion.

In August 1626, Gov. Yeardley appointed Farrar as commissioner (i.e., magistrate) of the "Upper Partes"[sic] which lies along the James River upstream from Piersey's Hundred having jurisdiction over Charles City and the City of Henrico. Farrar was the head commissioner of six commissioners appointed: he was the one given the right of final judgement when present and allowed the discretion to hold monthly courts at either Jordan's Journey or Shirley Hundred. When his commission was renewed by Governor Sir John Harvey in 1632, it also mandated that the court could only be in session when Farrar was present.

After 1619, settlers could purchase the cost of transporting white indentured servants from England to the New World as a contract that could be redeemed as a headright, and these headright contracts could be used for speculation by being sold, bought, or bartered. William Farrar was one of the settlers involved in this activity. For example, he is listed in patents as selling headrights to the settler William Andrewes around 1628 and surrendering land to Nathan Martin for the transport of servants in 1636.

== Sale of inheritance ==
When William Farrar's father, John the elder, died sometime before May 1628, he willed his various landholdings in Hertfordshire to William. In addition, John Farrar also stipulated that William and his family receive a £20 annuity from his older brother from rents in Halifax Parish, Yorkshire and that William receive £50 upon his return to England. In 1631, William Farrar returned to England to claim his inheritance. He then sold the assets from his inheritance to his brothers, including his annuity for £240 and his landholdings for £200, for a total of £440 (equivalent to about $148,000 today) and returned to Virginia.

== Death and Farrar's Island legacy ==
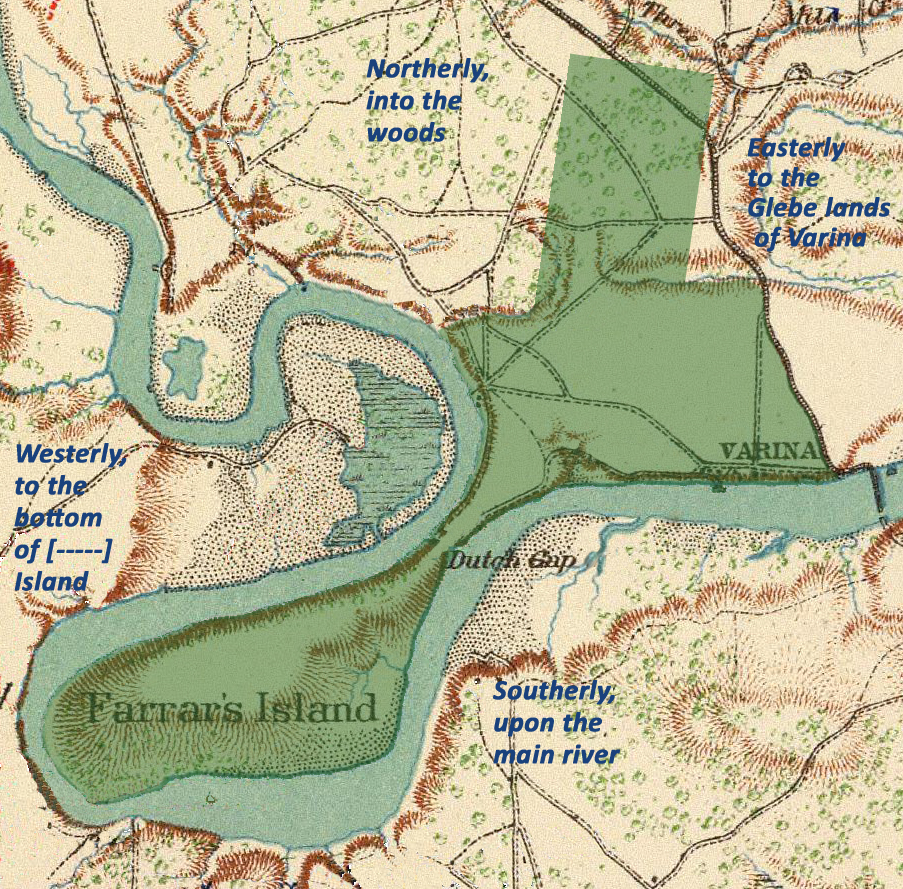
Approximate extent of William Farrar's 2000-acre 1637 land grant in green with boundary descriptions from patent in blue

At the time of his death sometime before June 11, 1637, Farrar was described as being "of Henrico", one of eight shires established in Virginia three years previously. By the time of his death, he had established his headright to a 2000-acre land patent at a site that included Dutch Gap and the former settlement of Henrico. This headright was given for 40 indentured servants, who were named in the patent. (Note: At least seven of those named where people listed as living with Farrar and Jordan in the Muster of 1624/1625.) After Farrar's death, the headright was repatented to his oldest son, his namesake who was about twelve years old at the time, by John Harvey, who had returned from England and resumed his role as colony's governor.

The patent covered a peninsula formed by meander loop, or curl, of the James River subsequently known as Farrar's Island, describing it as abutting the glebe lands of Varina in the east, and extending to the James River in the south, the end of the island (i.e., peninsula) in the west, and "to the woods" in the north. Farrar's Island remained with the Farrar family until 1727 when his great-grandson William Farrar IV sold it to Thomas Randolph.

In modern times, Farrar's Island is part of the Dutch Gap Conservation Area and Henricus Historical Park, both administered by Chesterfield County, Virginia.
