= Thomas Dale =

English soldier and colonial administrator

Sir Thomas Dale Marshal of Virginia
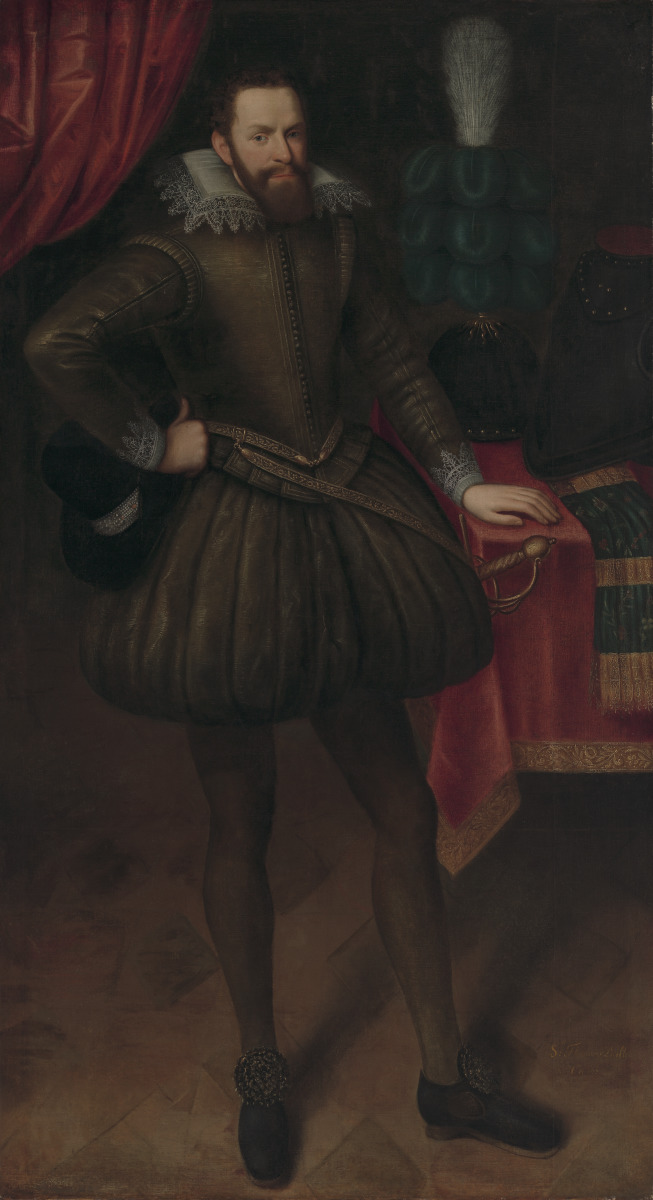
- Portrait by Marcus Gheeraerts the Younger, c. 1609–1619
- Born: c. 1570
- Died: 19 August 1619; Machilipatnam, Golconda Sultanate
- Occupations: Naval commander, deputy-governor of the Virginia Colony
- Spouse: Lady Elizabeth Dale (née Throgmorton) (m. 1611)

Sir Thomas Dale (c. 1570 – 19 August 1619) was an English soldier and colonial administrator who served as deputy-governor of the Colony of Virginia in 1611 and again from 1614 to 1616. Dale is best remembered for the energy and the extreme rigour of his administration in Virginia, which established order and in various ways seems to have benefited the colony, although he was criticised for high-handedness. He is also credited with the establishment of Bermuda Hundred, Bermuda Cittie, and the Cittie of Henricus.

== Early career ==
From about 1588 to 1609, Thomas Dale was in the service of the Low Countries (the Netherlands and parts of modern Belgium) with the English army originally under Robert Dudley, Earl of Leicester. Because of his ability and ambition, he became friends with many people in positions of authority. In 1599 Thomas Dale was recruited by the Robert Devereux, 2nd Earl of Essex for England's army and was knighted by King James to become "Sir Thomas Dale of Surry" on 16 June 1606.

While Dale was still serving in the Low Countries, on the recommendation of the eldest son of King James, Henry Frederick, Prince of Wales, the States-General of the United Netherlands consented "that Captain Thomas Dale (destined by the King of Great Britain to be employed in Virginia in his Majesty's service) may absent himself from his company for the space of three years, and that his said company shall remain meanwhile vacant, to be resumed by him if he think proper."

== Leading the Virginia Colony ==
Five years later, the Virginia Company of London sent Sir Thomas Dale to act as deputy-governor or as "Marshall of Virginia" (a new position) for the Virginia Colony under the authority of Thomas West, 3rd Baron De La Warr (Lord Delaware). Sent with three ships, on 19 May 1611, he arrived at Jamestown (named after King James) with men, cattle, and provisions. He found the conditions unhealthy and greatly in need of improvement. Dale immediately called for a meeting of the Jamestown Council and established crews to rebuild Jamestown.

He served as acting Governor for 3½ months in 1611 and again for a two-year period between 1614 and 1616. In the interim, he served as the Marshall of the colony, initially serving directly under Deputy Governor Sir Thomas Gates. Effectively, for five years, he was the highest ranking law enforcement officer in Virginia. He exhibited a certain stern efficiency which was perhaps the best support and medicine that could have been devised.

It was during his administration that the first code of laws of Virginia, nominally in force from 1611 to 1619, was effectively tested. This code, entitled "Articles, Lawes, and Orders Divine, Politique, and Martiall" (popularly known as Dale's Code), was notable for its pitiless severity and seems to have been prepared in large part by Dale himself. A career military officer, he established martial law (which continued until 1619) and an effective military system, which included offensive operations against nearby Native Americans as well as maintaining at Jamestown a fortress with three blockhouses (the first begun in 1609 at the isthmus that connected the ) and earthworks.

Perhaps Dale's most lasting reform was economic. In 1613, without stockholder consent, Dale abandoned the communal agriculture which had proved unsatisfactory, and he assigned 3-acre (12,000 m2) plots to its ancient planters and smaller plots to the settlement's later arrivals. Measurable economic progress was made, and the settlers began expanding their planting to land belonging to local native tribes. Not only did food production increase markedly, but the following year John Rolfe succeeded on his plot in raising the first hybrid tobacco − the key to the colony's future.

Seeking a better site than swampy and insect-ridden Jamestown Island (notoriously unhealthy during summer months), Thomas Dale sailed up the James River (also named after King James) to the area now known as Chesterfield County. He was apparently impressed with the possibilities of the general area where the Appomattox River joins the James River, and there are published references to the name "New Bermuda" although it apparently was never formalized. (Far from the mainland of North America, the archipelago of Bermuda had been established as part of the Virginia Colony in 1612 following the shipwreck of the Sea Venture in 1609.)

A short distance further up the James, in 1611, Dale began constructing a village at Henricus, in a horseshoe bend of the James River where a canal would later be created to create Farrars Island. Henricus was envisioned as possible replacement capital for Jamestown and was to have the first college in Virginia. (Ill-fated Henricus was destroyed more than five years after Dale's departure, during the Indian massacre of 1622, during which a third of the colonists were killed.)

In addition to creating the new settlement at Henricus, Dale also established the port town of Bermuda Hundred and "Bermuda Cittie" (sic). He began the excavation work at Dutch Gap, using methods he had learned while serving in Holland.

In 1614, Governor Thomas Dale sent 20 men, under Lieutenant William Craddock, to the area across the Chesapeake Bay from mainland Virginia now known as the Eastern Shore to establish a salt works and to catch fish for the colonists. They intended to make salt by boiling down the sea water. They settled along Old Plantation Creek at a place named "Dale's Gift" on the mainland, but they established the salt works on Smith Island, which is located adjacent to the southern portion of the Eastern Shore in present-day Northampton County near Cape Charles.

== Return to England ==
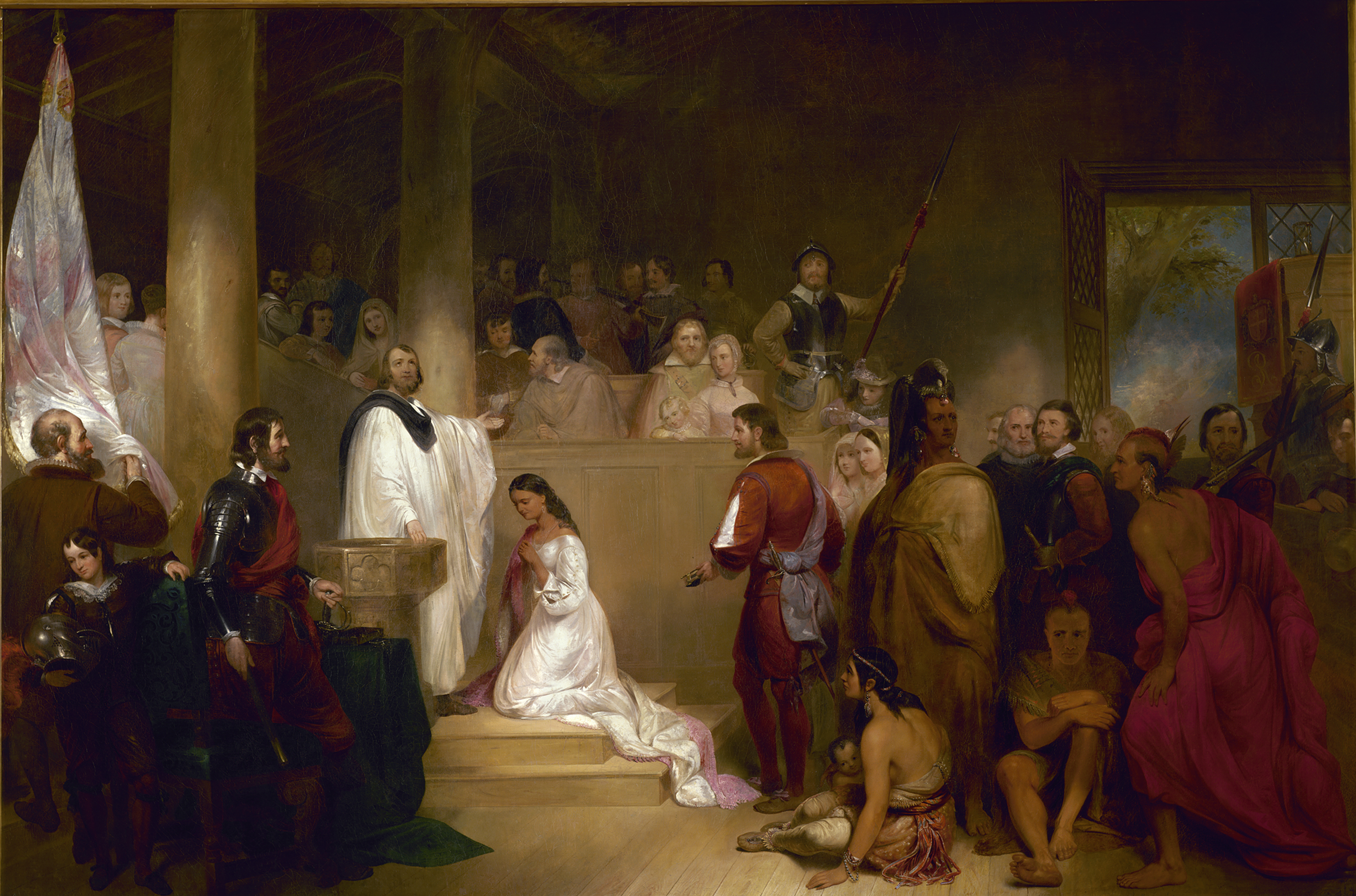
Dale (left, standing behind Alexander Whitaker wearing armor) as portrayed in Baptism of Pocahontas, 1840, by John Gadsby Chapman

Governor Dale sailed back to England in the spring of 1616 aboard the Treasurer. Accompanying him on what was considered an investor-relations journey were John Rolfe, his wife Pocahontas (Mataoka), and their one-year-old son, Thomas Rolfe. Samuel Argall commanded that ship. Queen Anne and others were reportedly charmed by Pocahontas, and investment in the Virginia Company was enhanced. However, soon after leaving London, as John Rolfe and his wife sailed down the Thames River, Pocahontas became very ill and died on 21 March 1617 before returning to Virginia. In December that year, Sir Henry Savile wrote to the courtier Sir Dudley Carleton, recommending Dale for office, following his service in Virginia.

In 1618, Dale was appointed commander of a squadron of six ships, which the East India Company sent out in April to maintain their interests against the aggressive policy of the Dutch and for the relief of Nathaniel Courthope, who was reportedly beleaguered on the island of Run. Dale arrived at Bantam in November 1618, and on 23 December he engaged the Dutch fleet off Jacatra (now Jakarta). After a sharp action, he put it to flight and laid siege to the Dutch fort at Jacatra, in the swamps around which he seems to have contracted the sickness of which, in the course of the following summer, he died at Masulipatnam in India.

== Legacy ==
- Thomas Dale High School in Chesterfield County, Virginia is named after him.
- The Dale Magisterial District of Chesterfield County is also named in his honor.
- Due to the severity of his legal regime, Governor Dale appears as one of the "jury of the damned" in the 1937 short story "The Devil and Daniel Webster". The story alleges that Dale "broke men on the wheel".
- Dale was voiced by Hugh Dignon in the Animated Hero Classics 1994 direct-to-video episode, Pocahontas.
- Dale's Pale Archeological District includes the location of a defensive palisade built by him in 1613 around the original settlement at Bermuda Hundred.
- John and Rebecca/Pocahontas Rolfe's only son Thomas was named after him.

== Sources ==
- This article incorporates text from a publication now in the public domain: "Dale, Thomas (d.1619)". Dictionary of National Biography. London: Smith, Elder & Co. 1885–1900.

Government offices
Preceded by George Percy	Colonial Governor of Virginia; 1611	Succeeded by Thomas Gates
Preceded by Thomas Gates	Colonial Governor of Virginia; 1614–1616	Succeeded by George Yeardley
