= Cecily Jordan Farrar =

Early settler and ancient planter

- Born: c. 1600; England
- Died: after 1631; Colony of Virginia
- Spouses: Samuel Jordan, William Farrar

Cecily Jordan Farrar was one of the earlier women settlers of colonial Jamestown, Virginia. She arrived in the colony as a child in 1610 and was established as one of the few female ancient planters by 1620. After her husband Samuel Jordan died in 1623, Cecily obtained oversight of his 450-acre plantation, Jordan's Journey. In the Jamestown Muster of 1624-1625, she is one of fewer than ten women mentioned as a head of household and the only woman listed as sharing the head of household with a man she was not married to. In the year of Samuel Jordan's death, she set off the first breach of promise lawsuit in English North America when she chose the marriage proposal of William Farrar, who was bonded to help settle her estate, over that of Greville Pooley, who claimed his proposal had already been accepted. In 1625, Cecily prevailed when Pooley withdrew his claim. Afterward, she married William Farrar.

== The early years in the Virginia Colony ==
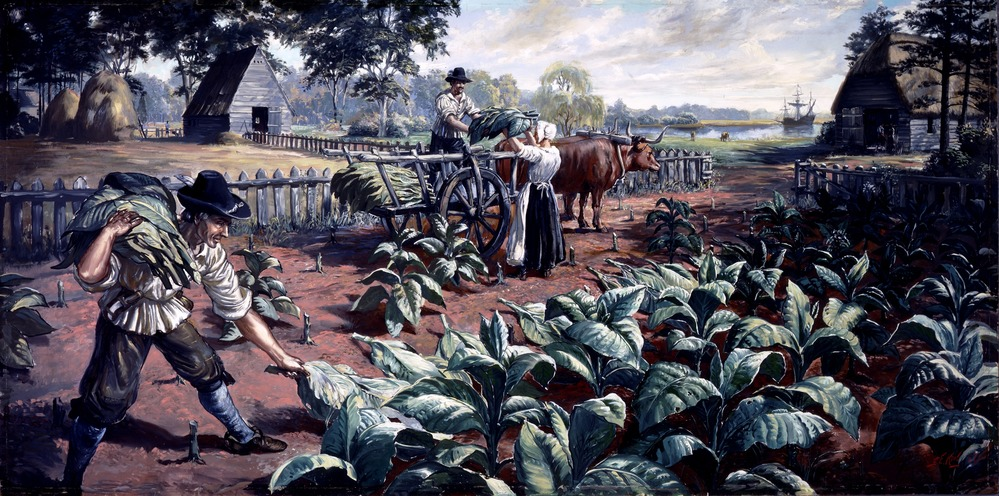
Sidney King's painting of tobacco farming illustrates the activity that made plantations like Jordan's Journey successful.

Cecily's life and background were unknown before she came to the New World. She was among the earlier women to arrive in Jamestown, Virginia. When Cecily arrived onboard Swan in August 1611, she was around ten years old (Note: The Jamestown Muster of 1624/25 gives her age as 24 in January 1624/25) and one of 20 women among the 260 passengers. Her arrival was part of a series of transports that were intended to replenish Jamestown's population. During the previous year's Starving Time, Jamestown had been reduced to only 60 people, and was saved from abandonment by the last-minute arrival of an earlier transport in June 1610 led by Lord De La Warr.

Cecily's first years in the colony were during the first Anglo-Powhatan war, which resulted in the deaths of over 400 settlers and Powhatan people and only ended with John Rolfe's marriage to Pocahantas in 1614. In 1618, the Great Charter enacted by the Virginia Company as instructions to Virginia's Governor George Yeardley established a grant for colonists who had lived in Virginia for at least three years and had paid their way to the colony through their own money or working off their debt for being transported. The instructions called these colonists ancient planters, and each received a grant of 100 acres of land as their dividend for investing in the Virginia Company. She is identified as an ancient planter in a 1620 patent and was one of the very few women that received this grant. (Note: Cecily was one of only 14 women in Alexander Brown's list of 108 people who qualified as ancient planters according to the Virginia Company's Great Charter.)

== Marriage to Samuel Jordan ==
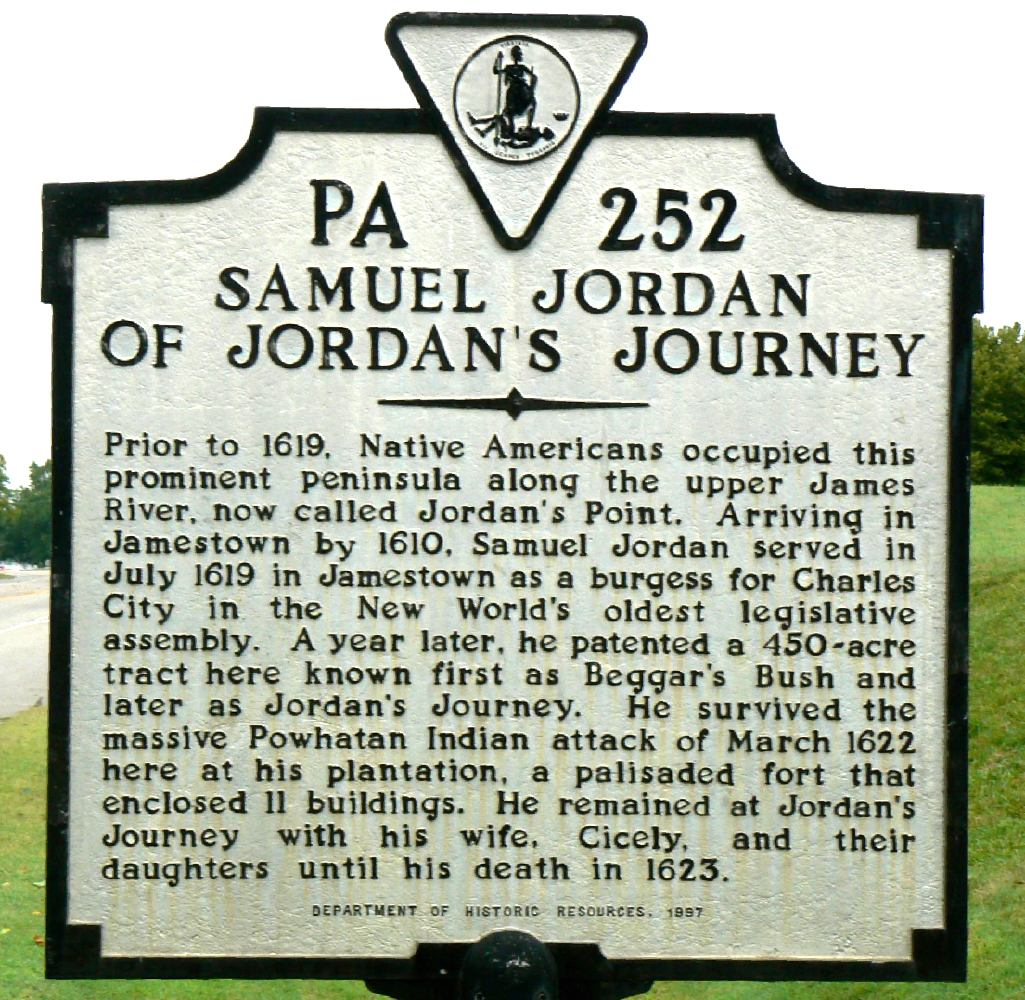
Virginia Historical Highway Marker of Jordan's Journey, where Cecily was a head of household.

By 1620, Cecily had married Samuel Jordan and was living at Jordan's Journey, a 450-acre plantation on the James River. A year later, she gave birth to their daughter Mary. Cecily and her family survived the Powhatan surprise attack in 1622 that initiated the Second Anglo-Powhatan War. Although nearly a third of all the colonists in Virginia were killed in this surprise attack, nobody was listed as among the slain at Jordan's Journey. After the attack, Jordan's Journey provided a haven for survivors whose plantations were on the upper James River.

== The breach of promise suit and marriage to William Farrar ==
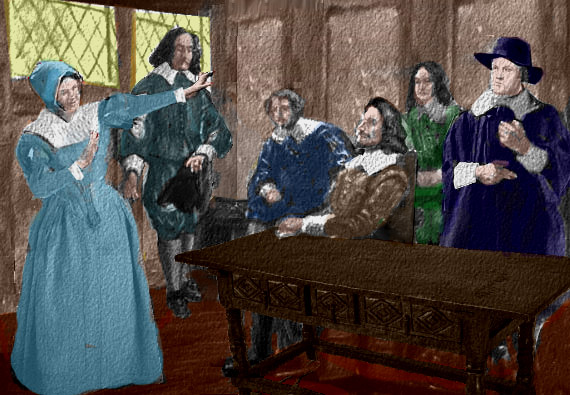
Dramatization of Cecily Jordan rejecting Greville Pooley's claims

Samuel Jordan died in early 1623, when Cecily was pregnant with their daughter, Margaret. Cecily was then authorized to settle her husband's estate, and William Farrar, a colonist who had left his land after the Powhatan attack and moved to Jordan's Journey, was bonded to help her. During this time, Jordan's Journey prospered.

About three or four days after Samuel Jordan's death, Reverend Greville Pooley claimed to have proposed marriage to Cecily and claimed she accepted. However, she instead chose to contract herself to William Farrar before Governor Yeardley and the Council of Virginia, disavowing Pooley's claim. As a result of Cecily's action, Pooley initiated the first breach of promise suit in English-speaking North America. After two years of litigation, the case was resolved in Cecily's favor in 1625. Pooley discharged her from all contracts and bound himself to a £500 bond stating that he would never have any claims, rights, or titles over her.

While the case was ongoing, Cecily and William Farrar lived at Jordan's Journey and continued to work together, and both "Mr. William Ferrar and Mrs. Jordan" were named as the heads of the household in the Jamestown Muster of 1624/25. (Note: No more than 6 out of 191 muster heads were women. Four of these were widows. Only Cecily was listed as joint head of household with somebody who was not her husband.) By May 1625, Cecily and Farrar were finally married, and they had three children together: Cecily, William, and John. It is not known when Cecily died. (Note: Archaeologists excavating Jordan's Journey suggested that one of the more carefully constructed graves found there may be Cecily's; osteological analysis indicates the woman in this grave died between 25-34 years of age. If this woman is Cecily, she most likely died no later than 1634.) The last year she is mentioned is 1631 in the record of William Farrar's sale of his assets in England.

== Relationship to Temperance Baley ==
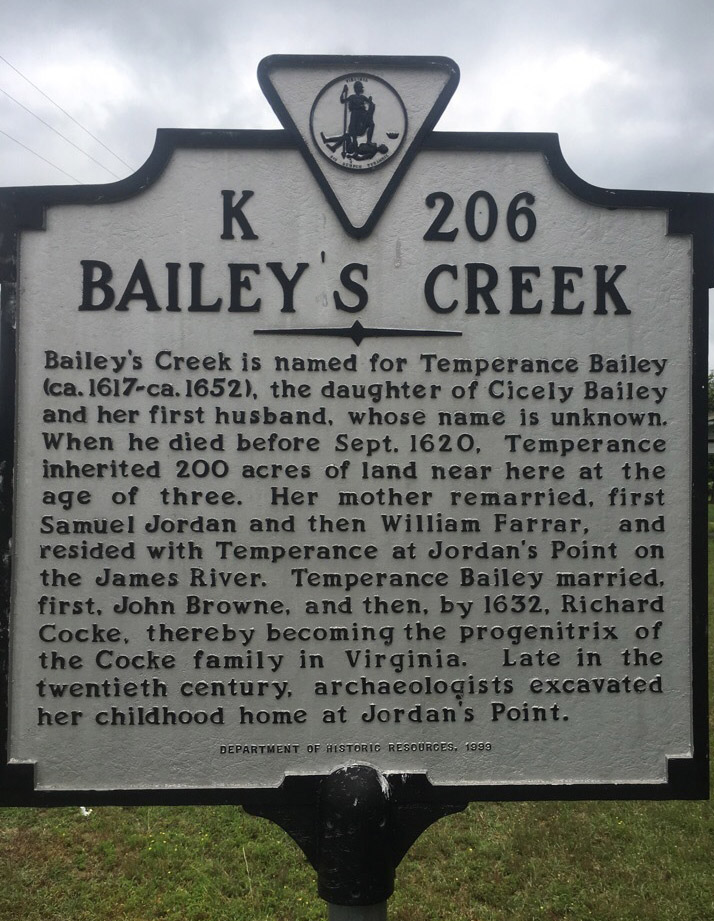
Historical marker for Bailey's Creek that assumes Cecily is the mother of Temperance Bailey and notes that her father is unknown.

In the Jamestown Muster of 1624-1625, the list of Cecily and William Farrar's household members includes Temperance Baley (now spelled Bailey), who was listed as seven years old and born in Virginia. Temperance is listed as receiving a patent for 100 acres in 1620 when she was about two or three years of age; she is also listed as having 200 acres planted in 1625. Samuel Jordan's 1620 patent lists her properties as adjoining his. Based on this evidence, several researchers have concluded that Temperance may be Cecily's daughter from a previous husband named Baley. However, there is no direct documentation that she is Temperance's mother or that she had a husband before marrying Samuel Jordan. In addition, Temperance's father has not been conclusively identified.
