= Farrar's Island =

Peninsula in Virginia, US

- Peninsula
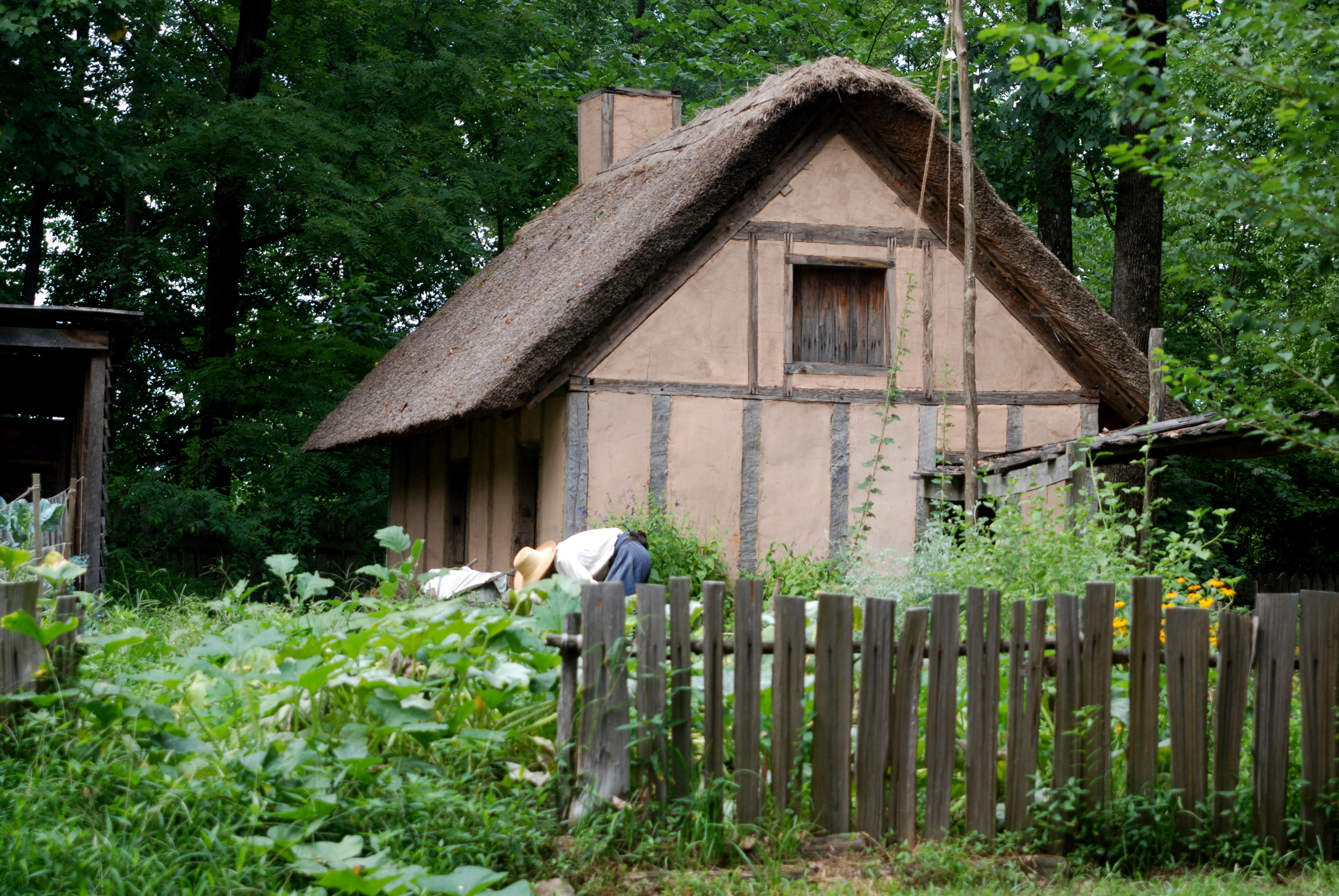
- Reconstruction of early 17^{th}-century house at Henricus Historical Park on Farrar's Island.

- Location within Virginia Location within the United States
- Coordinates: 37.366°N 77.375°W
- Location: Chesterfield County, Virginia
- Elevation: 6 m

Farrar's Island is a peninsula now on the west side of the James River in Chesterfield County, Virginia. The county operates the Dutch Gap Conservation Area and Boat Landing and as well as a living history museum, the Henricus Historical Park. Originally, Farrar's Island was formed by a meander loop in the James River and lay on the east side of the James River. At its smallest point, the neck of the peninsula was less than 400 feet (120 metres) wide. At that time, Farrar's Island was slightly less than 700 acres (280 hectares) and lay about 15 miles (24 km) south of the James River fall line at Richmond, Virginia.

Due to its strategic location on the river, the peninsula's neck became the site of the earliest English settlements in Virginia, Henricus, founded by Sir Thomas Dale in 1611, but mostly abandoned by 1622. Farrar's Island acquired its name after 1637 when William Farrar obtained ownership as part of the headright due him for importing indentured servants to the colony. Farrar was a lawyer who also served on the Virginia governor's council and as a magistrate in the Crown Colony of Virginia. The Farrar family owned the peninsula until 1737 when a descendant sold it to Thomas Randolph.

During the last year of the American Civil War, Farrar's Island played a minor role in the Bermuda Hundred campaign. The James River along the peninsula anchored the left flank of Union General Benjamin Butler's defensive line. The area around Farrar's Island had river defenses by both Union and Confederate forces, each seeking to deny its enemy the use of the James River. The James River around Farrar's Island was also the site of one of the last major naval engagements of the war, the Battle of Trent's Reach. During the war, Farrar's Island became a true island when General Butler's troops built the Dutch Gap Canal, across the neck of the peninsula.

In the 1870s, the Dutch Gap Canal was expanded and became the main channel of the James River, which allowed shipping to bypass the meander loop around Farrar's Island. Construction of the canal put Farrar's Island on the west side of the James River, and it evolved into its present form as a tidal lagoon surrounded by woods and wetlands.

== Colonial history ==
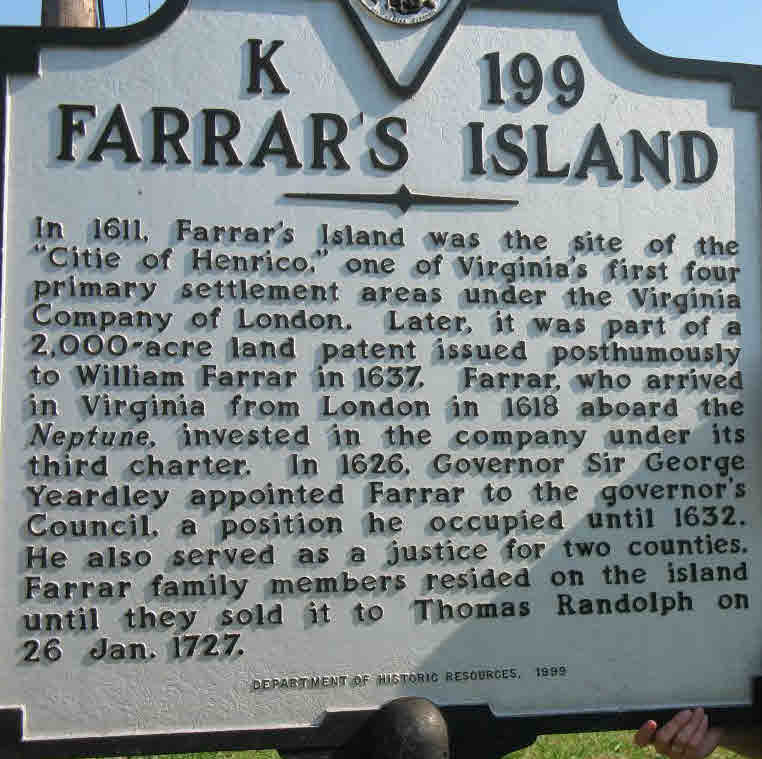
Historical Marker, Farrar's Island

In the colonial era, Farrar's Island was technically a peninsula (a neck of land). However, in 17th century Virginia when the land was acquired by the Farrar family, a neck of land mainly surrounded by a river could also be known as an island. At its most narrow point, the neck was less than 200 yards wide and its elevation above the James River varied from 3 feet to about 49 feet. In the original patent that gave the land to William Farrar, the peninsula was called an island; though in the will of his namesake son, the land was called a neck. By the time of the American Civil War, the peninsula had acquired its common name of Farrar's Island.

At the time of English-Native American contact period starting around 1607, the area around Farrar's Island was associated with the Arrohattoc, a tribe within the Powhatan Confederacy. The tribe's village of Arrohateck is depicted in John Smith and William Holes's map of 1607 Virginia as located approximately on the east side of the James River approximately 5 leagues (15 miles) south of the river's fall line. However, Arrohateck village was apparently deserted by the time the English began settling in the area.

The first English settlement on Farrar's Island was Henricus, which Sir Thomas Dale, the deputy-governor of the Virginia Colony established in 1611. The settlement was located on the neck of the peninsula, near the former village of Arrohateck. The Virginia Company of London had ordered Dale to find a healthy location to secure the navigable portion of the upstream James River and to provide a place of retreat in case of an attack by the Spanish. Intending the new settlement to become the colony's principal seat, Dale rapidly made Henricus a well-built, strongly-fortified settlement. The new fortifications included a ditch with a palisade behind that ran across the peninsula's neck. Historian Robert Hunt Land suggests that at this time the peninsula's neck got the name "Dale's Dutch Gap", since Dale had served as a long-time soldier of fortune with the United Provinces of the Netherlands. However, the settlement did not thrive. By the time Dale returned to England in 1616, Henricus was already dilapidated, consisting of few houses and the ruins of a never-completed church. Though Henricus was incorporated into the City of Henrico, what was left of it was abandoned after the Powhatan attack of 1622, as the settlement was not listed as one of the fortified strongholds that the Virginia Company ordered survivors to move to.

In 1637, Farrar's Island became the property of William Farrar Jr., the namesake son of prominent councillor, William Farrar. Before he died, the elder William Farrar acquired a 2000-acre patent from Governor John Harvey based on headrights Farrar Sr. received for financing the transport of 40 persons from England to the Virginia Colony.

Farrar descendants continued to own Farrar's Island until it was sold to Thomas Randolph in 1727. In May 1771, twelve days of heavy rain in the mountains west of Richmond caused a deluge known as "The Great Fresh of 1771", which inundated the settlements and plantations along James River. (a possibly similar flood hit upriver Lovingston, Virginia in modern times) Because it was almost entirely surrounded by the James, Farrar's Island was particularly hard hit. All the property of the then owner, Thomas Mann Randolph was carried off by the flood, and the land's economic value was also severely reduced as 80 acres of arable topsoil washed away, leaving a pavement of stones.

== Civil War history ==
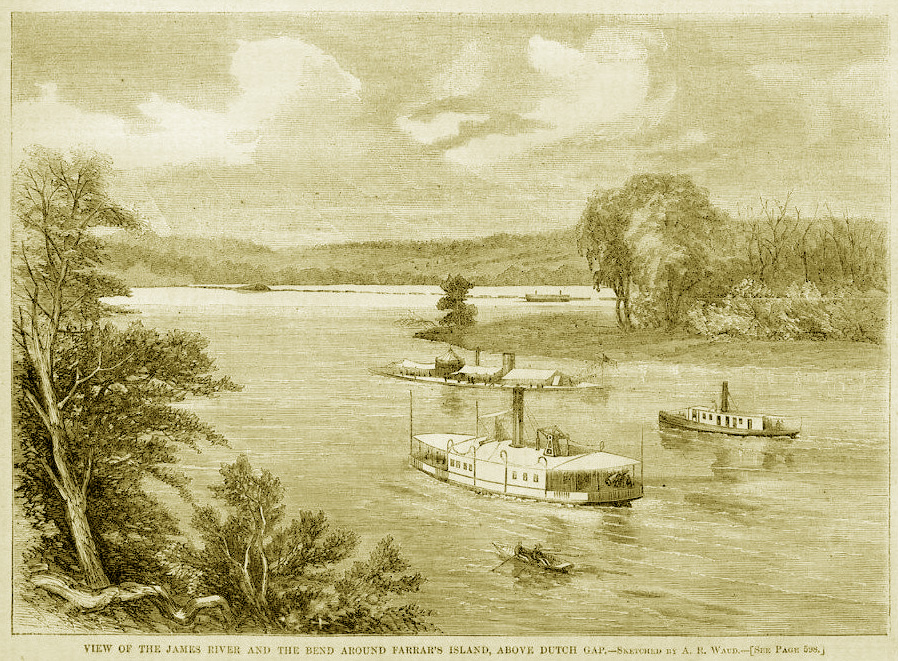
1864 depiction of Farrar's Island (on the right) with Union boom reaching to Trent's Reach (on distant left)

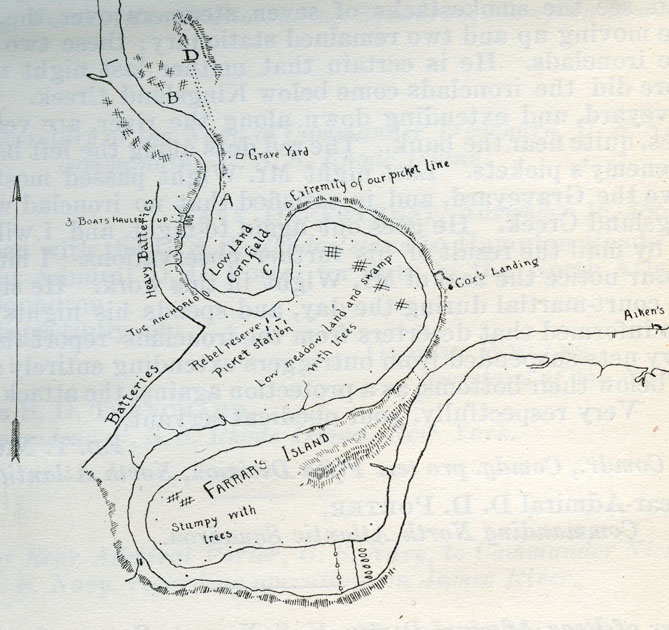
1864 Naval Scout drawing of James River and Farrar's Island with depiction of Confederate battery positions and Union boom across the James at Trent's Reach

By the time of the Civil War, Henry Cox of Farmer's Rest, who had substantial landholdings on the James River, owned Farrar's Island, which was sometimes referred to as Cox's Island

In May 1864, Union General Benjamin Butler initiated the Bermuda Hundred campaign by landing the Army of the James at Bermuda Hundred and occupied the east side of the James River between Bermuda Hundred and Farrar's Island. After Butler gave up on his maneuver towards Richmond following his defeat at the Battle of Proctor's Creek, the Army of the James retreated to a line on the Bermuda Hundred Peninsula stretching from a bluff on the south bank of the James river overlooking Farrar's Island (which was called Trent's Reach), to the mouth of the Appomattox River. The Confederates then entrenched their forces on the Howlett Line, which was approximately parallel to the Union defenses. These fortified lines were held with only minor changes until after the end of the Siege of Petersburg in April 1865.

During this time, Farrar's Island became the front line in the struggle to control James River maritime traffic. In June 1864, General Ulysses S. Grant ordered the Union navy under Admiral Samuel Phillips Lee to sink five ships, which were then used to create an obstructive boom across the James River stretching between Farrar's Island and Trent's Reach. The barrier was to prevent Confederate warships from going downstream and attacking Grant's headquarters and depot during the Petersburg Campaign, which were located at City Point. The Confederates prevented Union warships from moving north by posting artillery batteries on the Howlett Line, as well as additional batteries on the east side of the James River north of Farrar's Island. These batteries provided a field of fire over almost all of the five-mile loop of the James that encircled Farrar's Island.

To bypass the loop around Farrar's Island, General Butler began excavating a canal across the peninsula's neck which became known as the Dutch Gap Canal. Work began in August 1864 and by January 1865 the canal completely cut the neck. However, the explosion that removed the bulkhead at the canal's north end to open it up threw so much debris into the canal that armed vessels could not use it, so dredging continued until April 1865, when the war ended. Completion of the canal made Farrar's Island a true island, though the canal was too shallow for navigation.

Also in January 1865, the James River around Farrar's Island became the site of one of the Civil War's last major naval battles, the Battle of Trent's Reach. In this battle, a Confederate flotilla of three ironclads and eight other warships failed to cross through the Union boom between Farrar's Island and Trent's Reach.

== Post-Civil War history ==
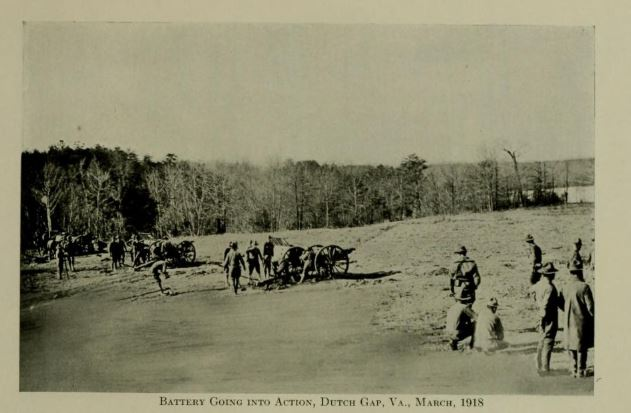
Soldiers of the 313th Field Artillery Regiment practicing at the Dutch Gap Artillery Range in 1918.

Immediately after the Civil War, Dutch Gap Canal remained unusable because Henry Cox, who still owned Farrar's Island, had filled in the northern end of the canal with a causeway to access the island. However, in 1870 a flood washed away the causeway and opened the canal to development. Improvements to the canal were not made until after 1871, and ongoing deepening and widening under the guidance of the Army Corps of Engineers continued at least through the decade's end. Richard Friend, who inherited the property from Cox in 1888, filed suit against the United States Government to recover his claimed losses due to the improvement of the canal, but lost his case.

In 1918, during World War I, Farrar's Island became part of the Dutch Gap artillery range. The 80th Division's artillery regiments, who were stationed in Fort Lee, used the island for gunnery training before heading to France and fighting in the Meuse-Argonne offensive.

Between 1920 and 1940, approximately 300 acres of Farrar Island became a tidal lagoon surrounded by wetland when the Richmond Sand and Gravel Company mined the area, creating a large pit that was subsequently connected to the old James River channel for barges to load the sand and gravel. In 1983, another 103 acres of Farrar's Island was transformed into an ash pond for the nearby Dominion Chesterfield Power Station located on the Dutch Gap Cutoff on the James River. Facing environmental criticism in 2016, Dominion planned to move toxic coal ash from the pond on Farrar's Island to a lined landfill at the Chester Power Station. Completion of the transfer is expected in 15 to 20 years.

== Farrar's Island today ==
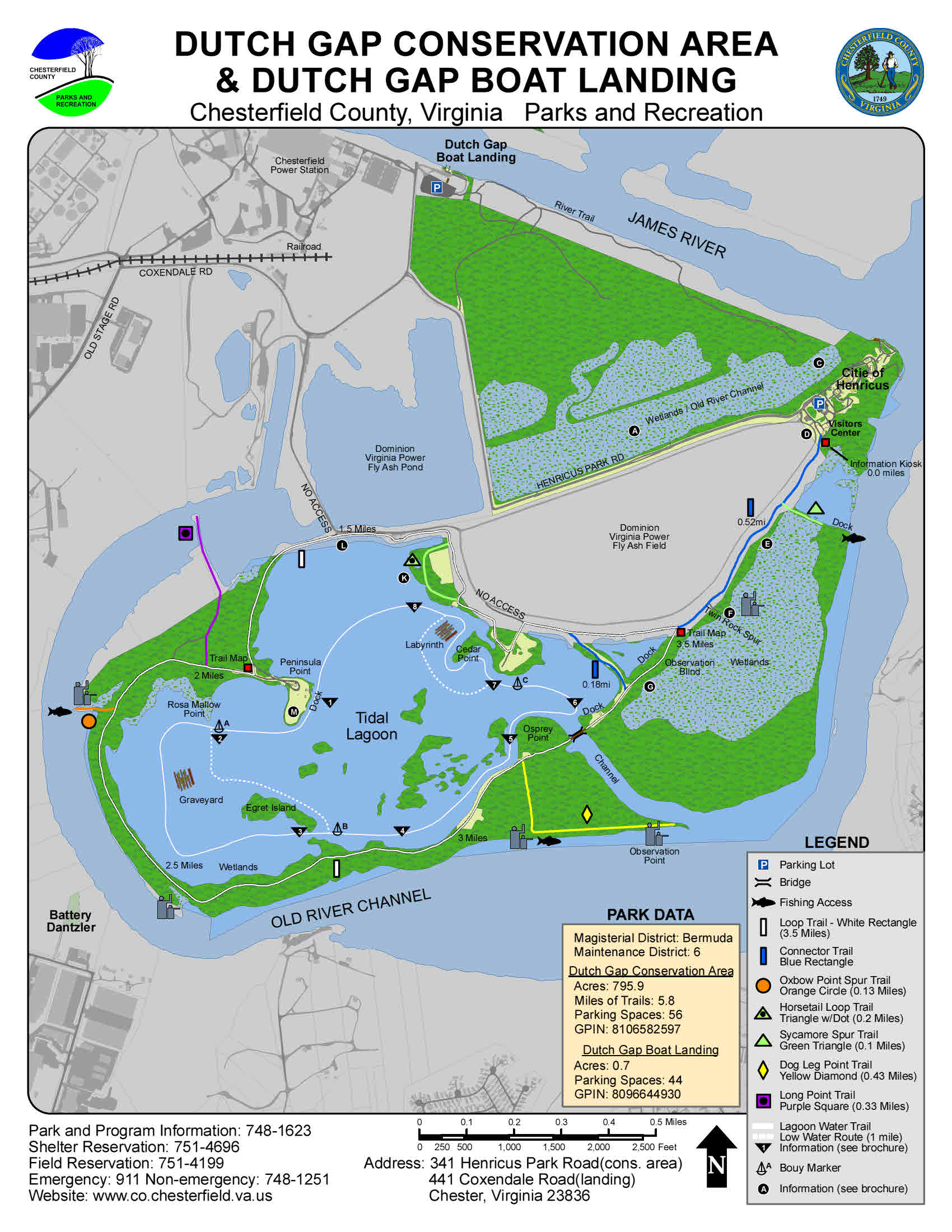
Farrar's Island as it appears today

Today, Farrar's Island is part of the Dutch Gap Conservation Area and is the location of Henricus Historical Park. Farrar's Island has once more become a peninsula as a section of the old river on the north side of the island has been filled in over time. However, this peninsula now lies on the east bank of the James River.
