= House of Burgesses =

Representative assembly in colonial Virginia

- Colony of Virginia
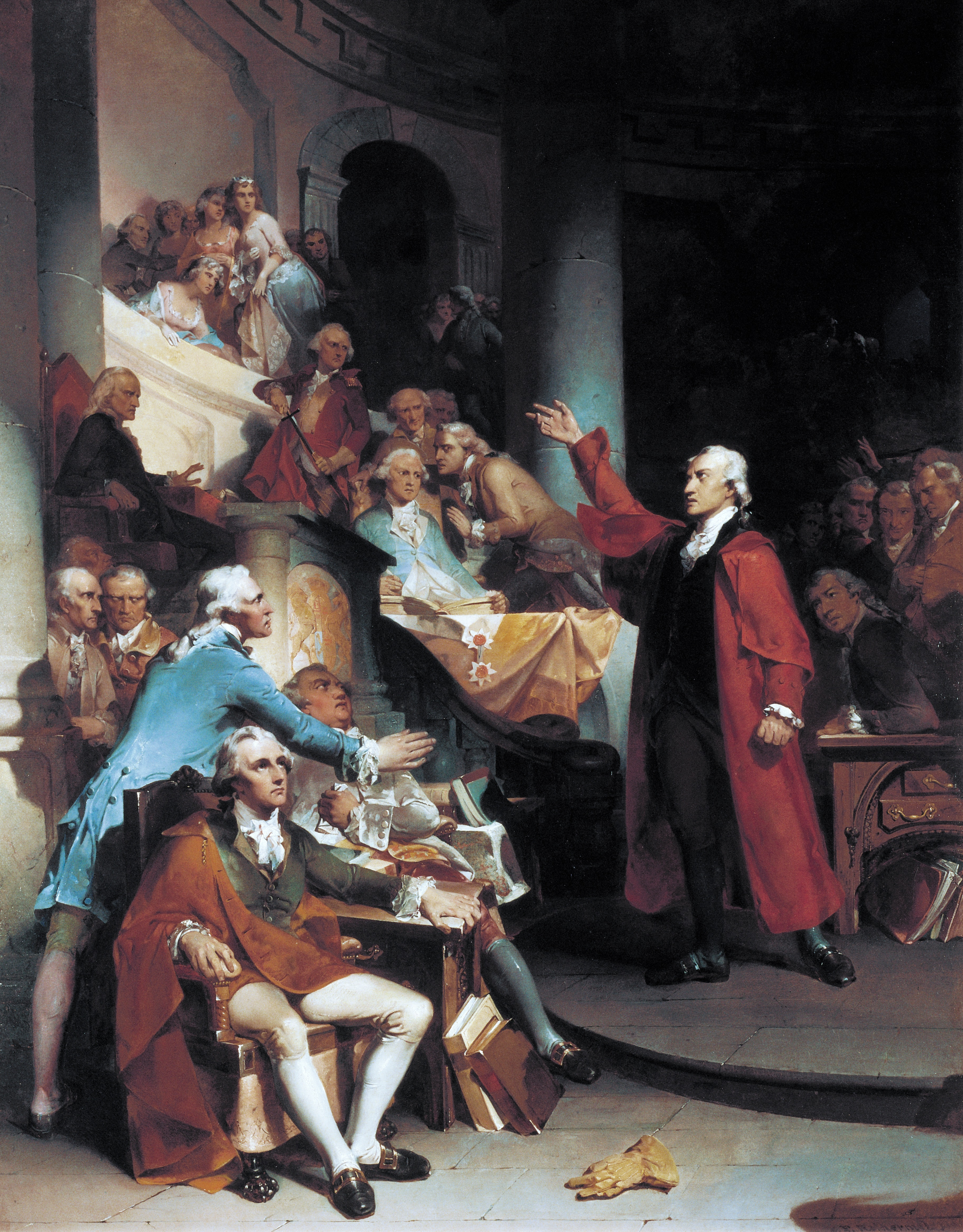
- 1851 painting of Patrick Henry making a speech in the house on March 23, 1765

History
- Established: 1619
- Succeeded by: Virginia House of Delegates in 1776

Meeting place
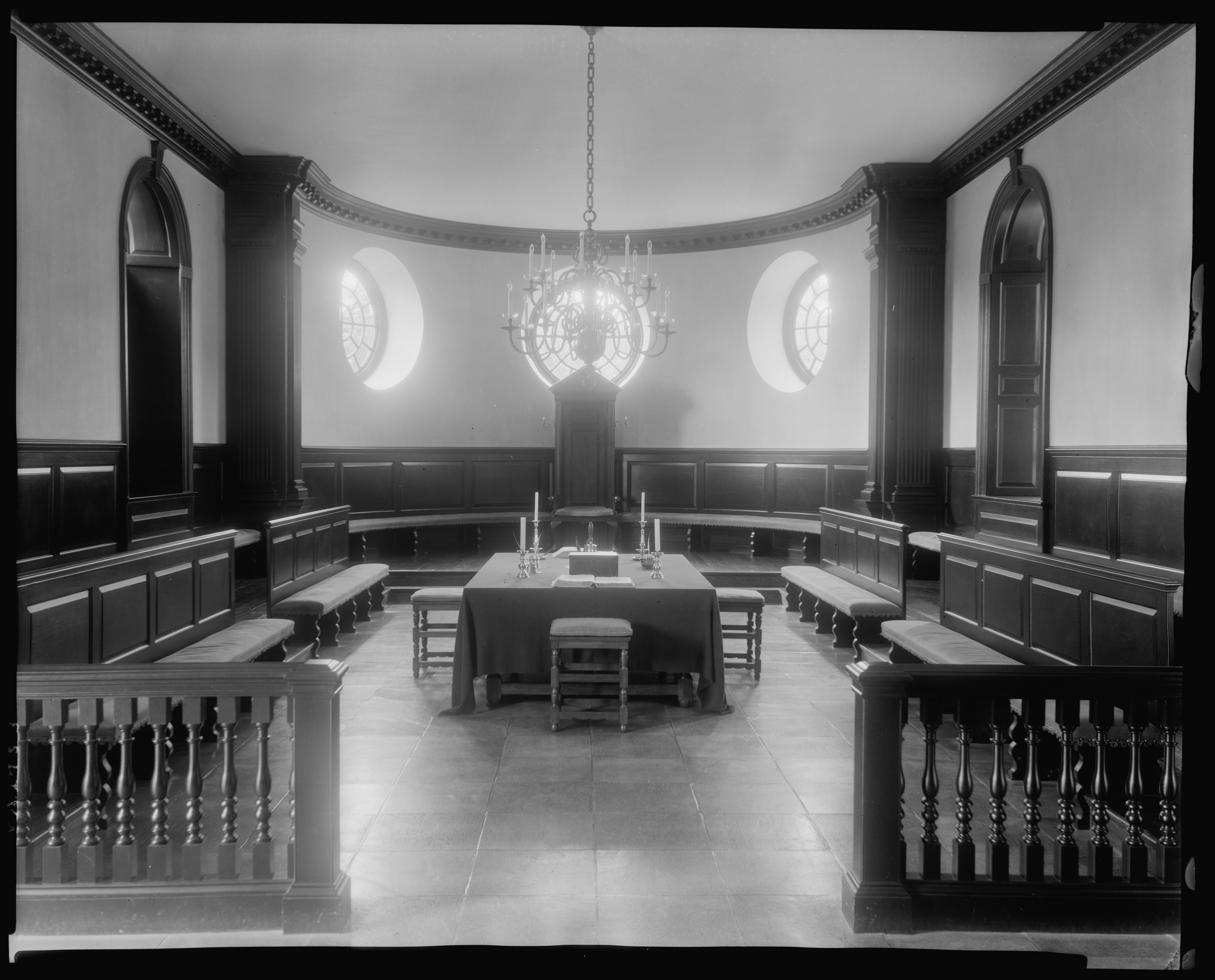
- Jamestown, Virginia (1619–99); Wren Building (1700–04); Williamsburg Capitol (1704–1776; reconstruction pictured)

The House of Burgesses (/ˈbɜːrdʒəsɪz/) was the lower house of the Virginia General Assembly from 1619 to 1776. It existed during the colonial history of the United States in the Colony of Virginia in what was then British America. From 1642 to 1776, the House of Burgesses was an important feature of Virginian politics, alongside the Crown-appointed colonial governor and the Virginia Governor's Council, the upper house of the General Assembly.

When Virginia declared its independence from the Kingdom of Great Britain during the Fifth Virginia Convention in 1776 and became the independent Commonwealth of Virginia, the House of Burgesses was transformed into the House of Delegates, which continues to serve as the lower house of the General Assembly.

== Title ==
Burgess originally referred to a freeman of a borough, a self-governing town or settlement in England.

== History ==
=== Founding ===
The Colony of Virginia was founded by a joint-stock company in the 1600s , the Virginia Company, as a private venture, though under a royal charter. Early governors provided the stern leadership and harsh judgments required for the colony to survive its early difficulties.

Early crises with famine, disease, Native American raids, the need to establish cash crops, and lack of skilled or committed labor, meant the colony needed to attract enough new and responsible settlers if it were to grow and prosper.

To encourage settlers to come to Virginia, in November 1618 the Virginia Company's leaders gave instructions to the new governor, Sir George Yeardley, which became known as "the great charter."

It established that immigrants who paid their own way to Virginia would receive fifty acres of land and not be mere tenants. The civil authority would control the military. In 1619, based on the instructions, Yeardley initiated the election of 22 burgesses by the settlements and Jamestown. They, together with the royally appointed Governor and six-member Council of State, would form the first General Assembly as a unicameral body.

The governor could veto its actions and the Company still maintained overall control of the venture, but the settlers would have a limited say in the management of their own affairs, including their finances.

A House of Assembly was created at the same time in Bermuda (which had also been settled by the Virginia Company, and was by then managed by its offshoot, the Somers Isles Company) and held its first session in 1620.

A handful of Polish craftsmen, brought to the colony to supply skill in the manufacture of pitch, tar, potash, and soap ash, were initially denied full political rights. They downed their tools in protest but returned to work after being declared free and enfranchised, apparently by agreement with the Virginia Company.

=== First session ===
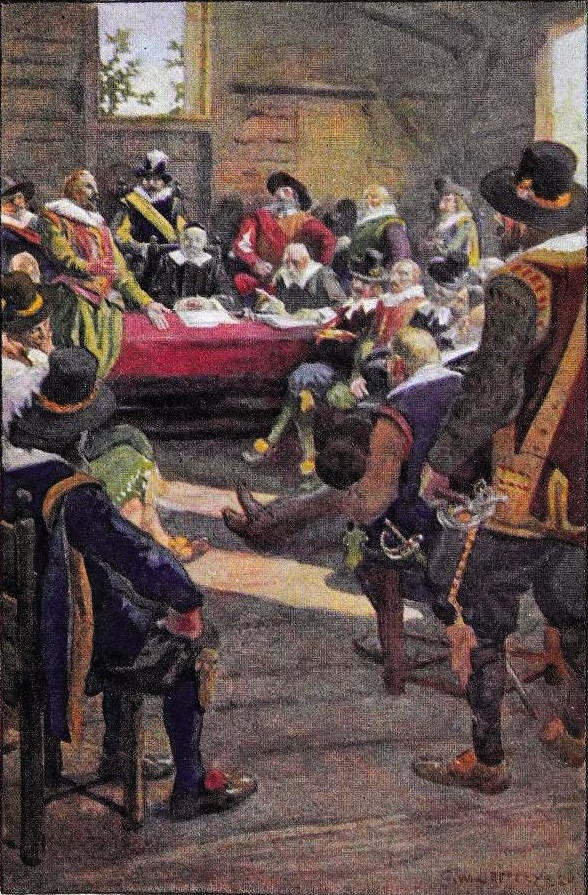
Depiction of the First Legislative Assembly in English America, 1619

On July 30, 1619, Yeardley convened the Virginia General Assembly as the first representative legislature in the Americas for a six-day meeting at the new timber church on Jamestown Island, Virginia. The unicameral Assembly was composed of the Governor, a Council of State appointed by the Virginia Company, and the 22 locally elected representatives.

The Assembly's first session of July 30, 1619, was cut short by an outbreak of malaria and adjourned after five days. On the third day of the assembly, the assembly's Journal noted "Mr. Shelley, one of the Burgesses, deceased." Twenty-two (22) members were sent to the assembly from the following constituencies:

- from James City: William Powell and William Spence
- from Charles City: Samuel Sharpe and Samuel Jordan
- from the City of Henricus: Thomas Dowse and John Pollington
- from Kecoughtan: William Tucker and William Capps
- from Smythe's Hundred: Thomas Graves and Walter Shelley
- from Martin's Hundred: John Boys and John Jackson
- from Argall's Gift Plantation: Thomas Pawlett and Edward Gourgainy
- from Flowerdew Hundred Plantation: Edmund Rossingham and John Jefferson
- from Lawne's Plantation: Christopher Lawne and Thomas Washer
- from Ward's Plantation: John Warde and John Gibbs
- from Martin's Brandon: Thomas Davis and Robert Stacy

The latter two burgesses were excluded from the assembly because John Martin refused to give up a clause in his land patent that exempted his borough "from any command of the colony except it be aiding and assisting the same against any foreign or domestic enemy."

=== Later 17th century ===
Especially after the massacre of almost 400 colonists on March 22, 1622, by Native Americans, and epidemics in the winters before and after the massacre, the governor and council ruled arbitrarily, showing great contempt for the assembly and allowing no dissent.

By 1624, the royal government in London had heard enough about the problems of the colony and revoked the charter of the Virginia Company. Virginia became a crown colony and the governor and council would be appointed by the Crown. Nonetheless, the Assembly maintained management of local affairs with some informal royal assent, although it was not royally confirmed until 1639.

In 1634, the General Assembly divided the colony into eight shires (later renamed counties) for purposes of government, administration, and the judicial system. By 1643, the expanding colony had 15 counties. All of the county offices, including a board of commissioners, judges, sheriff, constable, and clerks, were appointed positions. Only the burgesses were elected by a vote of the people. Women had no right to vote. Only free and white men originally were given the right to vote, by 1670 only property owners were allowed to vote.

In 1642, Governor William Berkeley urged the creation of a bicameral legislature which the Assembly promptly implemented; the House of Burgesses was thus formed and met separately from the Council of State.

In 1652, the parliamentary forces of Oliver Cromwell forced the colony to submit to being taken over by the English government. Again, the colonists were able to retain the General Assembly as their governing body. Only taxes agreed to by the assembly were to be levied. Still, most Virginia colonists were loyal to Prince Charles and were pleased with his restoration as King Charles II in 1660. He went on to directly or indirectly restrict some of the liberties of the colonists, such as requiring tobacco to be shipped only to England, only on English ships, with the price set by the English merchant buyers; but the General Assembly remained.

A majority of the members of the General Assembly of 1676 were supporters of Nathaniel Bacon. They enacted legislation designed to further popular sovereignty and representative government and to equalize opportunities. Bacon took little part in the deliberations since he was busy fighting the Native Americans.

In 1691, the House of Burgesses abolished the enslavement of Native peoples; however, many Powhatans were held in servitude well into the 18th century.

The statehouse in Jamestown burned down for the fourth time on October 20, 1698. The General Assembly met temporarily in Middle Plantation, 11 miles (18 km) inland from Jamestown, and then in 1699 permanently moved the capital of the colony to Middle Plantation, which they renamed Williamsburg.

== Moving toward independence ==
The French and Indian War in North America from 1754 to 1763 resulted in local colonial losses and economic disruption. Higher taxes were to follow, and adverse local reactions to these and how they were determined would drive events well into the next decade.

In 1764, desiring revenue from its North American colonies, Parliament passed the first law specifically aimed at raising colonial money for the Crown. The Sugar Act increased duties on non-British goods shipped to the colonies. The same year, the Currency Act prohibited American colonies from issuing their own currency. These angered many American colonists and began colonial opposition with protests. By the end of the year, many colonies were practicing non-importation, a refusal to use imported British goods.

In 1765, the British Quartering Act, which required the colonies to provide barracks and supplies to British troops, further angered American colonists; and to raise more money for Britain, Parliament enacted the Stamp Act on the American colonies, to tax newspapers, almanacs, pamphlets, broadsides, legal documents, dice, and playing cards. American colonists responded to Parliament's acts with organized protest throughout the colonies. A network of secret organizations known as the Sons of Liberty was created to intimidate the stamp agents collecting the taxes, and before the Stamp Act could take effect, all the appointed stamp agents in the colonies had resigned. The Massachusetts Assembly suggested a meeting of all colonies to work for the repeal of the Stamp Act, and all but four colonies were represented. The colonists also increased their non-importation efforts, and sought to increase in local production.

In May 1765, Patrick Henry presented a series of resolves that became known as the Virginia Resolves, denouncing the Stamp Act and denying the authority of the British parliament to tax the colonies, since they were not represented by elected members of parliament. Newspapers around the colonies published all his resolves, even the most radical ones which had not been passed by the assembly. The assembly also sent a 1768 Petition, Memorial, and Remonstrance to Parliament.

From 1769 to 1775, Thomas Jefferson represented Albemarle County as a delegate in the House of Burgesses. He pursued reforms to slavery and introduced legislation allowing masters to take control over the emancipation of slaves in 1769, taking discretion away from the royal Governor and General Court. Jefferson persuaded his cousin Richard Bland to spearhead the legislation's passage, but the reaction was strongly negative.

In 1769, the Virginia House of Burgesses passed several resolutions condemning Britain's stationing troops in Boston following the Massachusetts Circular Letter of the previous year; these resolutions stated that only Virginia's governor and legislature could tax its citizens. The members also drafted a formal letter to the King, completing it just before the legislature was dissolved by Virginia's royal governor.

In 1774, after Parliament passed the Boston Port Act to close Boston Harbor, the House of Burgesses adopted resolutions in support of the Boston colonists which resulted in Virginia's royal governor, John Murray, 4th Earl of Dunmore, dissolving the assembly. The burgesses then reassembled on their own and issued calls for the first of five Virginia Conventions. These conventions were essentially meetings of the House of Burgesses without the governor and Council, Peyton Randolph the Speaker of the House would serve as the President of the convention, and they would elect delegates to the Continental Congress. The First Continental Congress passed their Declaration and Resolves, which inter alia claimed that American colonists were equal to all other British subjects, protested against taxation without representation, and stated that Britain could not tax the colonists since they were not represented in Parliament.

In 1775, the burgesses, meeting in conventions, listened to Patrick Henry deliver his "give me liberty or give me death!" speech and raised regiments. The House of Burgesses was called back by Lord Dunmore one last time in June 1775 to address British Prime Minister Lord North's Conciliatory Resolution. Randolph, who was a delegate to the Continental Congress, returned to Williamsburg to take his place as Speaker. Randolph indicated that the resolution had not been sent to the Congress (it had instead been sent to each colony individually in an attempt to divide them and bypass the Continental Congress). The House of Burgesses rejected the proposal, which was also later rejected by the Continental Congress. The burgesses formed a Committee of Safety to take over governance in the absence of the royal governor, Dunmore, who had organized loyalists forces but after defeats, he took refuge on a British warship.

In 1776, the House of Burgesses ended. The final entry in the Journals of the House of Burgesses is "6th of May. 16 Geo. III. 1776 … FINIS." Edmund Pendleton, a member of the House of Burgesses (and President of the Committee of Safety) who was present at the final meeting, wrote in a letter to Richard Henry Lee on the following day, "We met in an assembly yesterday and determined not to adjourn, but let that body die." Later on the same morning, the members of the fifth and final Virginia Revolutionary Convention met in the chamber of the House of Burgesses in Williamsburg and elected Pendleton its president. The convention voted for independence from Britain. The former colony had become the independent Commonwealth of Virginia and the convention created the Constitution of Virginia with a new General Assembly, composed of an elected Senate and an elected House of Delegates. The House of Delegates acceded to the role of the former House of Burgesses.

== Meeting places ==
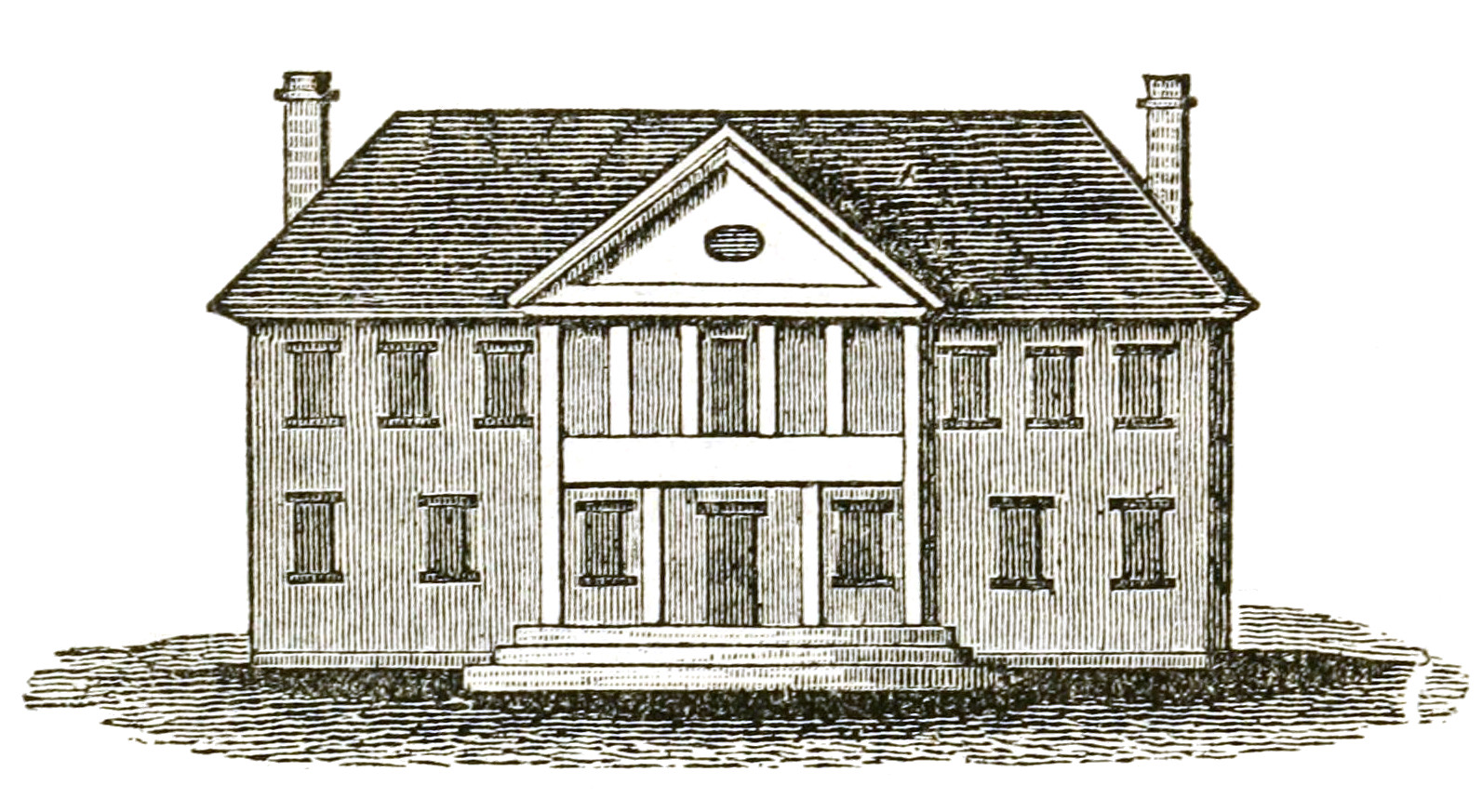
Second Capitol at Williamsburg (viewed from Duke of Gloucester Street)

In 1619, the General Assembly first met in the church in Jamestown. Subsequent meetings continued to take place in Jamestown.

In 1700, the seat of the House of Burgesses was moved from Jamestown to Middle Plantation, near what was soon renamed Williamsburg. The Burgesses met there, first (1700 to 1704) in the Great Hall of what is now called the Wren Building at the College of William and Mary, while the Capitol was under construction. When the Capitol burned in 1747, the legislature moved back into the college until the second Capitol was completed in 1754. The present Capitol building at Colonial Williamsburg is a reconstruction of the earlier of the two lost buildings.

In 1779, and effective in April 1780, the House of Delegates moved the capital city to Richmond during the American Revolutionary War for safety reasons.

== Legacy ==
The House of Burgesses became the House of Delegates in 1776, retaining its status as the lower house of the General Assembly, the legislative branch of the Commonwealth of Virginia. Through the General Assembly and House of Burgesses, the Virginia House of Delegates is considered the oldest continuous legislative body in the New World.

In honor of the original House of Burgesses, every four years, the Virginia General Assembly traditionally leaves the current Capitol in Richmond and meets for one day in the restored Capitol building at Colonial Williamsburg. The most recent commemorative session (the 26th) was held in January 2016.

In January 2007, the Assembly held a special session at Jamestown to mark the 400th anniversary of its founding as part of the Jamestown 2007 celebration, including an address by then-Vice President Dick Cheney.

In January 2019, to mark the 400th anniversary of the House of Burgesses, the Virginia House of Representatives Clerk's Office announced a new Database of House Members called "DOME" that "[chronicles] the 9,700-plus men and women who served as burgesses or delegates in the Virginia General Assembly over the past four centuries."

== See also ==
- List of members of the Virginia House of Burgesses
- List of speakers of the Virginia House of Burgesses
- Virginia Slave Codes of 1705

== Bibliography ==
- Meacham, Jon (2012). Thomas Jefferson: The Art of Power. Random House LLC. ISBN 978-0-679-64536-8.
- "Timeline of Jefferson's Life". Thomas Jefferson Foundation.
- Wood, Gordon S. (2002). The American Revolution, A History. New York, Modern Library. ISBN 0-8129-7041-1.
