= Elizabeth City Shire =

One of eight shires created in colonial Virginia

Coordinates: 36°56′N 76°21′W

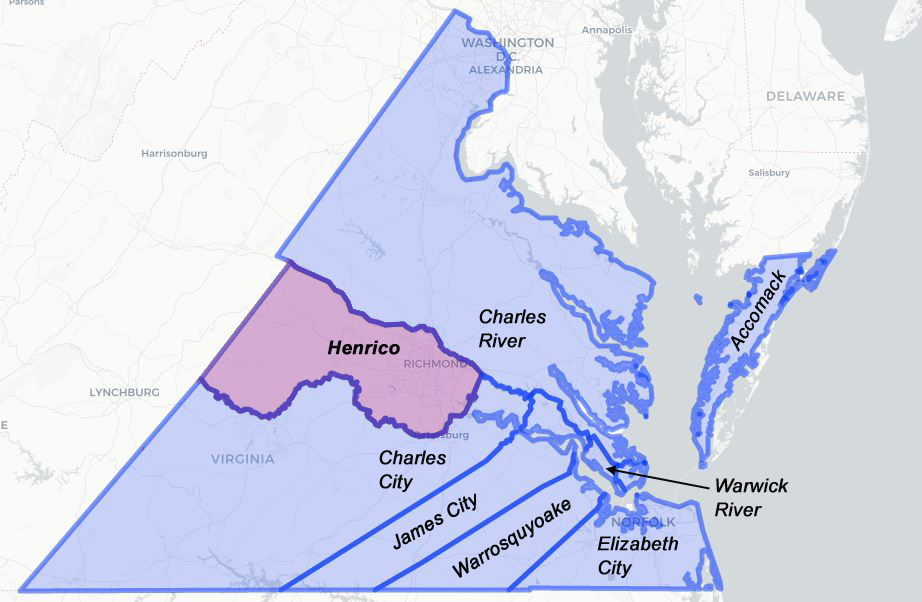
Map of the shires of Virginia, 1634

Elizabeth City Shire was one of eight shires created in colonial Virginia in 1634. The shire and the Elizabeth River were named for Elizabeth of Bohemia, daughter of King James I.

During the 17th century, shortly after establishment of Jamestown in 1607, English settlers and explorers began settling the areas adjacent to Hampton Roads. By 1610, the English colonists had established a permanent settlement in the Kecoughtan area of what was to become Elizabeth River Shire. Now located within the corporate limits of the independent city of Hampton, Virginia, it is the oldest known continuously occupied English settlement in North America.

On, November 18, 1618, the Virginia Company of London, proprietor of the colony, gave instructions on the formation of a laudable government for the Colony to Sir George Yeardley when he departed from London to become full governor of Virginia. As directed, in 1619, Governor Yeardly established four large corporations, termed citties (sic), which were designated to encompass the developed portion of the colony. These were Elizabeth Cittie, James Cittie, Charles Cittie, and Henrico Cittie.

In 1634, the English king (Charles I) directed the formation of eight shires (or counties) in the colony of Virginia. One of these was Elizabeth River Shire, which included land area on both sides of Hampton Roads. In 1636, New Norfolk County was subdivided from it, including all the area in South Hampton Roads now incorporated in the five independent cities located there in modern times. The remaining portion became known as Elizabeth City Shire. To this date, the Hampton-Norfolk city line is on the shore of Norfolk's beach on Hampton Roads, not in the middle of the water as might be expected.

In 1643, Elizabeth City Shire became Elizabeth City County. The boundaries of this area which contained the early colonial settlements at Kecoughtan and Millwood (later Phoebus), now essentially form those of the modern independent city of Hampton, Virginia.

== See also ==
- Elizabeth City (Virginia Company) (1619-1634)
- Elizabeth City County (1643-1952)
- Hampton, Virginia (1952-)
