= Independent city (United States) =

Cities not belonging to any particular county

In the United States, an independent city is a city that is not in the territory of any county or counties and is considered a primary administrative division of its state. Independent cities are classified by the United States Census Bureau as "county equivalents" and may also have similar governmental powers to a consolidated city-county or a unitary authority. However, in the case of a consolidated city-county, a city and a county were merged into a unified jurisdiction in which the county at least nominally exists to this day, whereas an independent city was legally separated from any county or merged with a county that simultaneously ceased to exist, even in name.

Of the 41 independent U.S. cities, 38 are in Virginia, whose state constitution makes them a special case. The three independent cities outside Virginia are Baltimore, Maryland, St. Louis, Missouri, and Carson City, Nevada. Baltimore is the most populous independent city in the United States.

== Virginia ==
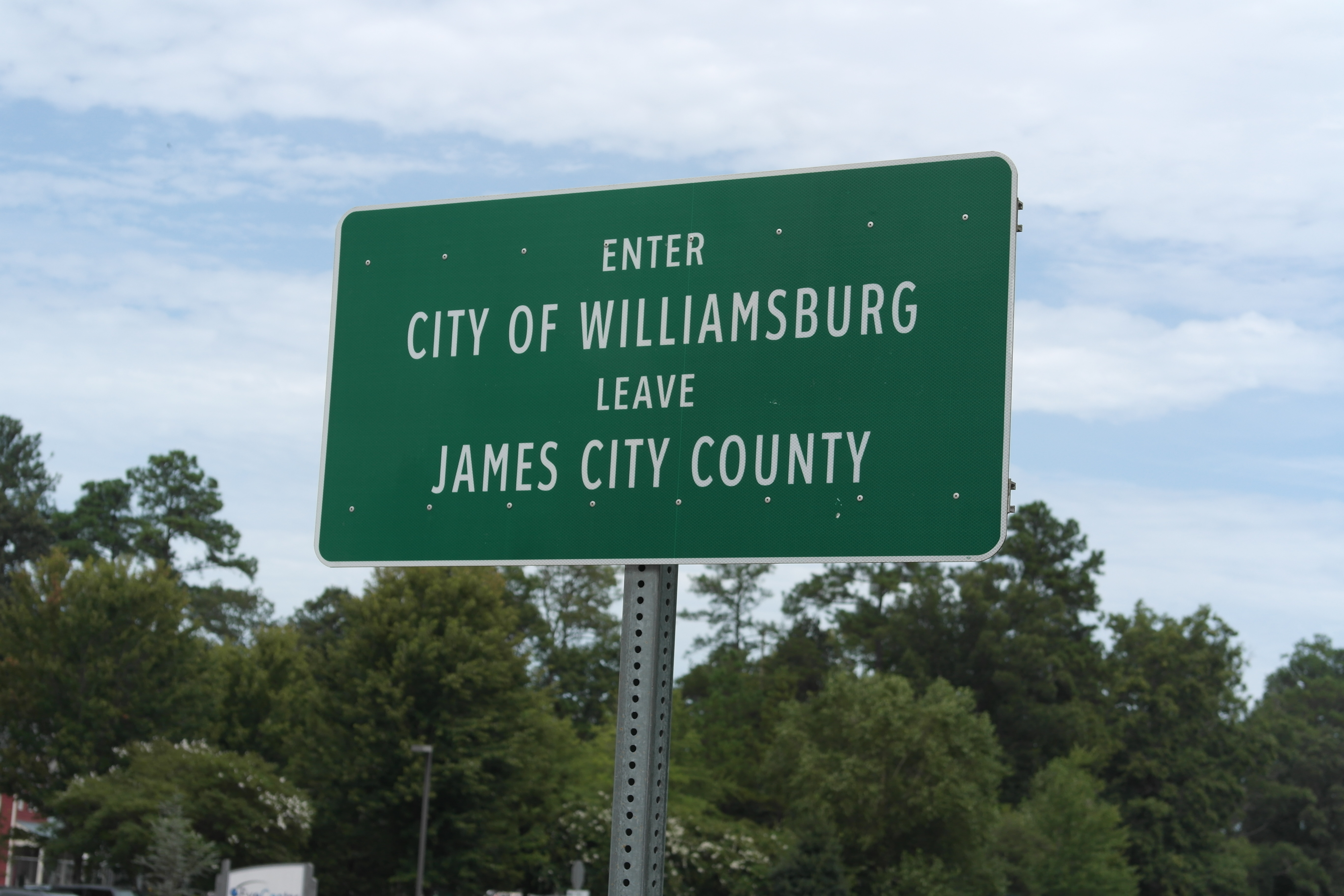
Sign marking the limits of Williamsburg, Virginia and James City County, Virginia. All cities in Virginia are independent from the counties that surround them.

Top 10 most populated cities in Virginia (2010).

=== History ===
In the Commonwealth of Virginia, all municipalities incorporated as "cities" have been "independent cities", also called "free cities", since 1871, when a revised state constitution took effect following the American Civil War and the creation of West Virginia. Virginia's thirty-eight independent cities are not politically part of any county, though some are completely surrounded by a single county, forming enclaves. Some other Virginia municipalities, even though they may be more populous than some existing independent cities, are incorporated towns. These towns always form part of a county. Incorporated towns have limited powers, varying by each charter. They typically share many aspects such as courts and public school divisions with the county they are within.

This municipal arrangement is in contrast to practices in other states. Cities and counties in Virginia sometimes form cooperative organizations for regional planning purposes.

In the Commonwealth of Virginia, there are two classes of city. The primary difference relates to the court system. A first-class city (e.g., Richmond) has its own District Court and also its own Circuit Court. A second-class city (e.g. Norton or Emporia) has its own District Courts, but not its own Circuit Court. As a second-class city, City of Fairfax shares a Circuit Court with Fairfax County, while Falls Church shares a Circuit Court with adjacent Arlington County. In Virginia, a District Court is not a court of record, so all cases are heard by a judge; all jury trials are heard in a Circuit Court.

Three older Virginia counties, whose origins go back to the original eight shires of Virginia formed in 1634 in the Colony of Virginia, have or had the word city in their names; politically, however, they are counties. The independent cities were formed to centralize trading and legal matters as the older system of merchant ships cruising from plantation to plantation was inefficient. The colonial capital of Williamsburg was created for this reason, being a port on the James River. Two of these counties are Charles City County and James City County, whose names originated with earlier "incorporations" created in 1619 by the Virginia Company as Charles Cittie and James Cittie. Additionally, Elizabeth City County, which was originally part of the older Elizabeth Cittie, became extinct in 1952 when it was consolidated politically by mutual consent with the small City of Hampton, its county seat, and the Town of Phoebus. These merged entities became the current independent city of Hampton, Virginia, one of the largest cities of Virginia by area and population.

Despite being legally separate from counties, twelve of Virginia's independent cities serve as county seats. These cities include:

- Charlottesville - Albemarle County
- Covington - Alleghany County
- Emporia - Greensville County
- Fairfax - Fairfax County
- Harrisonburg - Rockingham County
- Lexington - Rockbridge County
- Manassas - Prince William County
- Martinsville - Henry County
- Salem - Roanoke County
- Staunton - Augusta County
- Williamsburg - James City County
- Winchester - Frederick County

=== Former cities ===
Former independent cities, now extinct, that were long extant in Virginia include:

- Bedford, which gave up its city charter in 2013, and is now an incorporated town in Bedford County.
- Clifton Forge, which gave up its city charter in 2001, and is now an incorporated town in Alleghany County.
- Manchester, which was consolidated by mutual agreement with the City of Richmond in 1910.
- South Boston, which gave up its city charter in 1994, and is now an incorporated town in Halifax County.
- South Norfolk, which merged with Norfolk County in 1963 to form the City of Chesapeake.

Two other independent cities existed only for a short time:

- Nansemond, created from the former Nansemond County in 1972, was merged in 1974 with the then-City of Suffolk and three unincorporated towns within the county's former boundaries, to form today's City of Suffolk.
- Warwick, which was formed from the former Warwick County in 1952, was in 1958 consolidated by mutual agreement with the newly expanded City of Newport News.

== Other states ==
- The City of Baltimore has been separate from Baltimore County, Maryland since the adoption of the Maryland Constitution of 1851.
- Carson City, the capital of Nevada, consolidated with Ormsby County in 1969, and the county was simultaneously dissolved. Debates about consolidating Carson City and Ormsby County began in the 1940s, and it required Nevada voters to approve a state constitutional amendment in 1968 to allow the Nevada Legislature to perform such a consolidation.
- The City of St. Louis was separated from St. Louis County, Missouri in 1876 after voters approved secession from the county.

== Other entities similar to independent cities ==
An independent city is distinct from:

- A consolidated city-county (such as San Francisco, Philadelphia, or Denver), in which the city and county (or, as in Louisiana, a parish; or as in Alaska, a borough) governments have been merged. A consolidated city-county differs from an independent city in that the city and county both nominally exist, although they have a consolidated government, whereas in an independent city, the county does not even nominally exist.
- A highly urbanized county, such as Arlington County, Virginia, that is completely metropolitan but only contains unincorporated communities, no incorporated cities or municipalities.
- A "federated" city-county multi-tiered type of government such as applies between Miami and Miami-Dade County, Florida. Under this system the cities gain their powers from the Miami-Dade County Home Rule Charter (as opposed to the Constitution of Florida), with some functions being exclusive to the county that would otherwise belong to the cities in other Florida counties.
- The City of New York, which is a sui generis jurisdiction: the city has a unified government made up of five boroughs, each of which is territorially coterminous with a county of New York State. New York City's counties mostly lack their own government (as these functions are instead assumed by the city government), but they do each elect their own district attorney to prosecute crimes, and most of the court system is organized around the counties. Thus, the U.S. Census Bureau classifies each of the counties of New York City as "Areas having certain types of county offices, but as part of another government".
- Washington, D.C., which is a territory that has a special status as the U.S. capital. It is not part of any state nor county; instead, the District of Columbia is under the jurisdiction of the Congress of the United States in accordance with Article 1, Section 8 of the U.S. Constitution. The District was originally divided into three independent cities and two counties. Alexandria County (which now forms Arlington County) and the independent city of Alexandria were returned to Virginia in 1846. The three remaining entities (the City of Washington, Georgetown, and Washington County) were merged into a consolidated government by an act of Congress in 1871. Congress has established a home rule government for the territory, although local laws can be overridden by Congress. In practice, the District operates much like independent cities in the United States.
- Cities and towns in New England traditionally have very strong governments, while counties have correspondingly less importance. Today, most counties in southern New England (Connecticut, Rhode Island, and Massachusetts) have almost no governmental institutions or roles associated with them (aside from serving as a basis for court districts, along with demarcating National Weather Service warnings and media markets). Counties in southern New England still have a nominal existence, and so no city or town in those three states is truly separate from a county. The town and the county of Nantucket, Massachusetts (on the island of that name), are coterminous. The City of Boston used to provide both the complete governance and the complete revenue of its county, Suffolk County, though that county also includes three much smaller cities.
- Cities and towns in the Unorganized Borough of Alaska. Alaska is not divided into counties, but has near-equivalents called boroughs. However, unlike county-equivalents in the other 49 states, the boroughs do not cover the entire land area of the state. The area not territory of any borough is referred to as the Unorganized Borough, although it does not have its own local government. The Census Bureau divides the Unorganized Borough into several census areas which it treats as county equivalents for statistical purposes.

== See also ==
- Home rule in the United States
- Urban secession
