= Upper Norfolk County, Virginia =

Extinct county in colonial Virginia

Coordinates: 36.739323°N 76.609379°W

Upper Norfolk County is an extinct county which was located in colonial Virginia from 1637 until 1646.

In 1634, the King of England directed the formation of eight shires (or counties) in the colony of Virginia. One of these was Elizabeth City Shire, which included land area on both sides of Hampton Roads.

New Norfolk County was formed in 1636 from Elizabeth City Shire. It included all the area in South Hampton Roads now incorporated in the five independent cities located there in modern times.

In 1637, New Norfolk County was divided into Upper Norfolk County and Lower Norfolk County.

Upper Norfolk County became Nansemond County in 1646. The county became the independent city of Nansemond in 1972, and in 1974, merged with the city of Suffolk. The new consolidated city assumed the name of Suffolk.
