= Smith's Hundred =

English colonial settlement in Virginia

Coordinates: 37.3105°N 76.96445°W

Smith's Hundred or Smythe's Hundred was a colonial English settlement in the Province of Virginia, in the modern United States of America. It was one of the original James River plantations named after the treasurer of the Virginia Company, Sir Thomas Smythe. It was settled by the English in 1617 and after 1620, was known as Southampton Hundred in honor of the Earl of Southampton. The site was originally home to a village of the Paspahegh Indians. They were located along the north bank of James River.

Smith's Hundred was located eight miles above the English fort at Jamestown and extended from Weyanoke Hundred to the south bank of Chickahominy River on the north bank of James River. The settlement was abandoned after the Powhatan Uprising of 1622. The area is now called Sandy Point in Charles City County, Virginia.

The first General Assembly (which became the House of Burgesses) in 1619 included two representatives for Smythe's Hundred Plantation: Captain Thomas Graves and Walter Shelley.

== Communion silver ==
St. Mary's Church was established in Smith's Hundred in 1618 in part with £200 bequeathed by Mrs. Mary Robinson, of St. Olave Parish in London, to educate the "poore [sic] people" (i.e. Powhatan Indians) in Christianity. Along with others who contributed to the church was an unknown person who gave a set of Communion Silver (Hallmark: London 1617/1618). When the church was abandoned during the Uprising of 1622, the communion silver was taken to Jamestown. It was held by Sir George Yeardley, Governor of the Colony of Virginia.

After his death, the Jamestown court in 1628 had William Claiborne, land surveyor for the Colony, inventory the items from Smith's Hundred. It is believed he had the silver given to the St. John's Episcopal Church, the second Church in the relocated, renamed settlement (then called Elizabeth City). This silver comprises the oldest church artifacts in continuous use from the colonial period in the United States. These items are preserved and used on special occasions at St. John's, now located in Hampton, Virginia.
