= Thomas Graves (burgess) =

Early English settler in Virginia (1580–1635)

Captain Thomas Graves Esquire
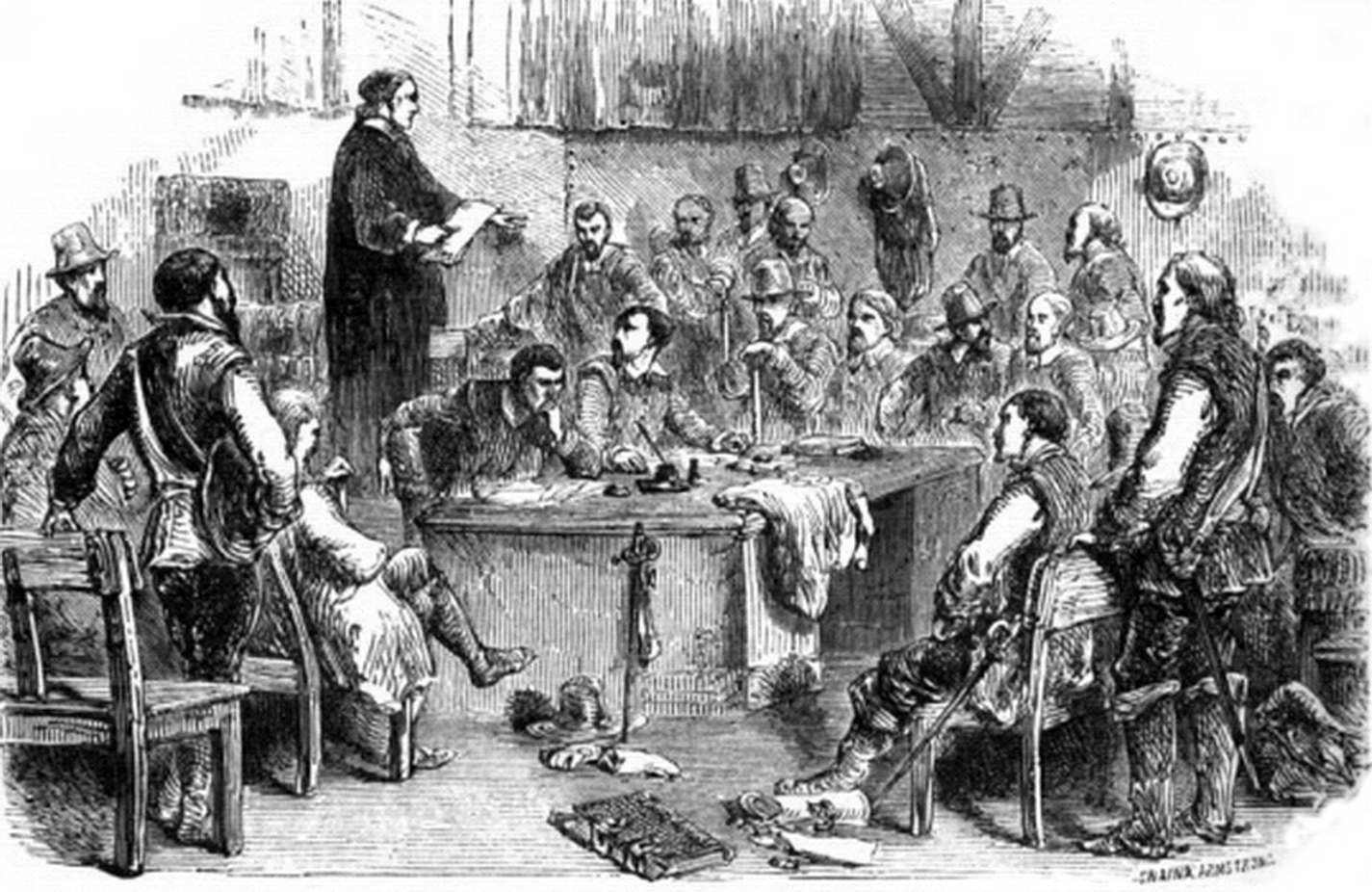
- Illustration of the First General Assembly of Virginia, 1619

Member of the Virginia House of Burgesses
- Incumbent
- Assumed office 1619

Personal details
- Born: c. 1580
- Died: c. 1635 Accomac Shire, Virginia Colony
- Spouse: Katherine Graves
- Children: John, Thomas, Ann, Verlinda, Katherine
- Known for: Early adventurer to Virginia colony (ancient planter)

Thomas Graves (c. 1580–1635) was one of the original Adventurers (stockholders) of the Virginia Company of London, and an ancient planter (settler) in early Jamestown, Virginia, the first permanent English settlement in North America. He was also the first known person named Graves in North America.

== Arrival in Virginia ==
Graves arrived in Virginia in October 1608 on the ship Mary and Margaret with Second Supply. He paid £25 (equivalent to £5,489 in 2025) for two shares in the London Company and thereby was entitled to 200 acres (0.81 km^{2}).

Captain Thomas Graves settled at Smythe's Hundred, situated on the north shore of the James River ten miles from Jamestown. Governor George Yeardley placed Graves in charge of Smythe's Hundred on May 30, 1618, after one man killed another in a fight.

== As a representative and early settler ==
Capt. Thomas Graves was a member of the First Legislative Assembly in America, and, with Mr. Walter Shelley, sat for Smythe's Hundred when they met at Jamestown, Virginia on July 30, 1619. His name appears on a monument to the first House of Burgesses which stands at Jamestown today.

Smythe's Hundred was abandoned after the Indian uprising of 1622. The next record of Captain Graves showed him living on the Eastern Shore of Virginia by February 16, 1624.

On February 8, 1627, Captain Francis West, Governor of Virginia, ordered that Thomas Graves have a commission to command the Plantation at Accomac. Graves was the second Commander. As an "ancient planter" he received one of the first patents there on March 14, 1628, consisting of 200 acres (0.81 km^{2}). He lived on Old Plantation Creek, now in Northampton County, Virginia, and served as Commissioner for Accomac Shire in 1629.

Captain Graves and three others represented the Eastern Shore in the Assembly of 1629‑30. He served again as a burgess in 1632. Because he was designated as "Esquire" on January 6, 1635, he may have been a member of the Council. Captain Thomas Graves, Esquire, was recorded as being a Justice at a court held for Accomac on April 13, 1635.

== Death and descendants ==
He died between November 1635, when he witnessed a deed, and January 5, 1635/6, when suit was entered for Mrs. Graves concerning theft by a servant. He was survived by his wife, Katherine, and six children: John, Thomas, Ann, Verlinda, Katherine and Francis.

His daughter, Verlinda, eventually married governor of Maryland, William Stone, and his daughter Anne married Harvard's headmaster Nathaniel Eaton, and had at least one son named James Eaton. A descendant of Gov. Stone and Verlinda was Founding Father Thomas Stone, a signatory of the declaration of independence, and nephew of Founding Father Daniel of St. Thomas Jenifer.
