= Colony of Virginia =

British colony in North America (1606–1776)

- 1606–1776
- Coat of arms (1606–1714) (after 1714)
- Motto: "En dat Virginia quintam" (before 1707); (English: "Behold, Virginia gives the fifth"); "En dat Virginia quartam" (after 1707); (English: "Behold, Virginia gives the fourth")
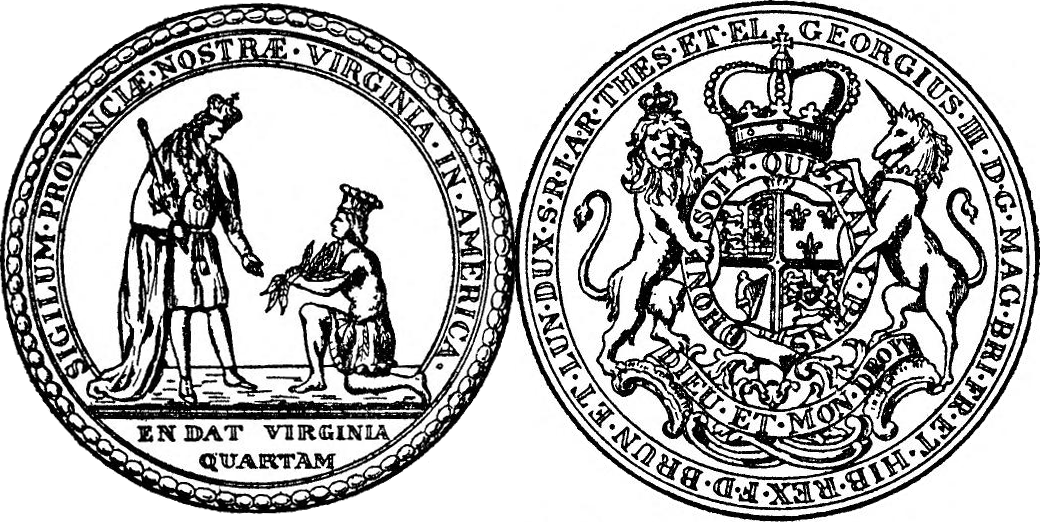
- Seal

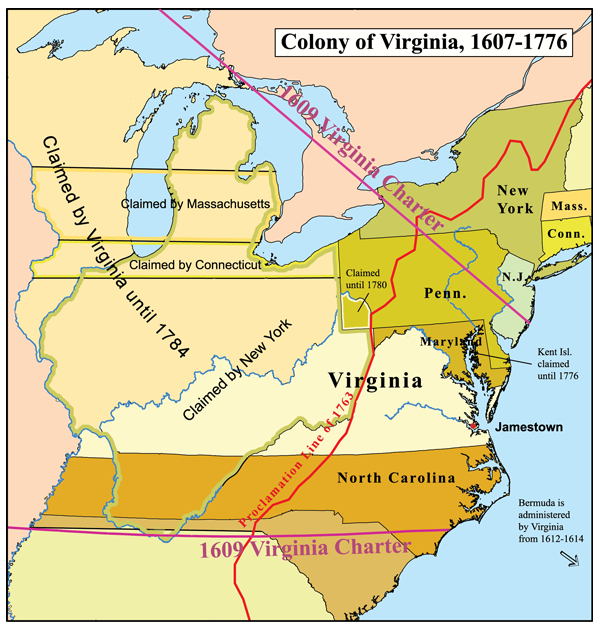
- Status: Proprietary colony (1606–1624); Crown colony (1624–1776)
- Capital: Jamestown (1607–1699); Williamsburg (1699–1776)
- Common languages: English; Siouan; Iroquoian; Algonquian
- Religion: Church of England (Anglicanism)
- Monarch
  - 1606–1625: James VI & I (first)
  - 1760–1776: George III (last)
- Governor
  - 1607: Edward Wingfield (first)
  - 1771–1776: Lord Dunmore (last)
- Legislature: General Assembly
  - Upper house: Governor's Council (1607–1776)
  - Lower house: House of Burgesses (1619–1776)
- Historical era: European colonization of the Americas
  - Roanoke Colony: 1585–1590
  - First Charter: April 10, 1606
  - First landing: April 26, 1607
  - Founding of Jamestown: May 14, 1607
  - Second Charter: May 23, 1609
  - House of Burgesses formed: July 30, 1619
  - Became royal colony: May 24, 1624
  - Independence: July 4, 1776
  - Constitution ratified: June 25, 1788
- Currency: Virginia pound (1624–1793)
Preceded by
Tsenacommacah
Powhatan Confederacy
Succeeded by
Virginia
Carolina Province
Somers Islands
- Today part of: United States; Bermuda (British Overseas Territory)

The Colony of Virginia was a British colonial settlement in North America from 1606 to 1776. The first effort to create an English settlement in the area was chartered in 1584 and established in 1585; the resulting Roanoke Colony lasted for three attempts totaling six years. In 1590, the colony was abandoned. But nearly twenty years later, the colony was re-settled at Jamestown, not far north of the original site. A second charter was issued in 1606 and settled in 1607, becoming the first enduring English colony in North America. It followed failed attempts at settlement on Newfoundland by Sir Humphrey Gilbert in 1583 and the Roanoke Colony (in modern eastern North Carolina) by Sir Walter Raleigh in the late 1580s.

The founder of the Jamestown colony was the Virginia Company, chartered by King James I, with its first two settlements being in Jamestown on the north bank of the James River and Popham Colony on the Kennebec River in modern-day Maine, both in 1607. The Popham colony quickly failed because of famine, disease, and conflicts with local Native American tribes in the first two years. Jamestown occupied land belonging to the Powhatan Confederacy; it was also on the brink of failure before the arrival of a new group of settlers and supplies by ship in 1610. Tobacco became Virginia's first profitable export, the production of which had a significant impact on the society and settlement patterns.

In 1624, the Virginia Company's charter was revoked by King James I, and the Virginia Colony was transferred to royal authority as a crown colony. After the English Civil War in the 1640s and 1650s, the Virginia colony was nicknamed "The Old Dominion" by King Charles II for its perceived loyalty to the English monarchy during the era of the Protectorate and Commonwealth of England.

From 1619 to 1775/1776, the colonial legislature of Virginia was the General Assembly, which governed in conjunction with a colonial governor. Jamestown remained the capital of the Virginia Colony until 1699; from 1699 until its dissolution, the capital was in Williamsburg. The colony experienced its first significant political turmoil with Bacon's Rebellion of 1676.

After declaring independence from the Kingdom of Great Britain in 1775, before the Declaration of Independence was officially adopted, the Virginia Colony became the Commonwealth of Virginia, one of the original thirteen states of the United States, adopting as its official slogan "The Old Dominion". The entire modern states of West Virginia, Kentucky, Indiana, Illinois, Wisconsin, and Michigan, and portions of Ohio, Western Pennsylvania, and Minnesota were later created from the territory encompassed, or claimed by, Virginia during the American Revolutionary War.

== Etymology ==
=== Virginia ===
"Virginia" is the oldest designation for English claims in North America. In 1584, Sir Walter Raleigh sent Philip Amadas and Arthur Barlowe to explore what is now the North Carolina coast. They returned with word of a regional king (weroance) named Wingina, who ruled a land supposedly called Wingandacoa. "Virginia" was originally a term used to refer to England's entire North American possession and claim along the east coast from the 34th parallel (close to Cape Fear) north to the 45th parallel. This area included a large section of Canada and the shores of Acadia.

The name Virginia for a region in North America may have been originally suggested by Raleigh, who named it for Queen Elizabeth I, the "virgin queen", in approximately 1584. In addition, the term Wingandacoa may have influenced the name Virginia. On his next voyage, Raleigh learned that while the chief of the Secotans was indeed called Wingina, the expression wingandacoa heard by the English upon arrival actually meant "What good clothes you wear!" in Carolina Algonquian and was not the name of the country as previously misunderstood.

The colony was also known as the Virginia Colony, the Province of Virginia, and occasionally as the Dominion and Colony of Virginia or His Majesty's Most Ancient Colloney and Dominion of Virginia.

=== Old Dominion ===
According to tradition, in gratitude for the loyalty of Virginians to the crown during the English Civil War, Charles II gave it the title of "Old Dominion". The colony seal stated from Latin en dat virginia quintum, in English 'Behold, Virginia gives the fifth', with Virginia claimed as the fifth English dominion after England, France, Scotland and Ireland.

The Commonwealth of Virginia maintains "Old Dominion" as its state nickname. The athletic teams of the University of Virginia are known as the "Cavaliers", referring to supporters of Charles II, and Virginia has a public university called "Old Dominion University".

== History ==
Although Spain, France, Sweden, and the Netherlands all had competing claims to the region, none of these prevented the English from becoming the first European power to colonize successfully the Mid-Atlantic coastline. The Spanish had made earlier attempts in what is now Georgia (San Miguel de Gualdape, 1526–1527; several Spanish missions in Georgia between 1568 and 1684), South Carolina (Santa Elena, 1566–1587), North Carolina (Joara, 1567–1568) and Virginia (Ajacán Mission, 1570–1571); and by the French in South Carolina (Charlesfort, 1562–1563). Farther south, the Spanish colony of Spanish Florida, centered on St. Augustine, was established in 1565, while to the north, the French were establishing settlements in what is now Canada (Charlesbourg-Royal briefly occupied 1541–1543; Port Royal, established in 1605).

=== Colonization attempts in the New World (1583–1590) ===
In 1583, Sir Humphrey Gilbert established a charter in Newfoundland. Once established, he and his crew abandoned the site and returned to England. On the return trip, Gilbert's ship capsized, and all aboard perished. The charter was abandoned.

In 1585, Raleigh sent his first colonization mission to Roanoke Island (in present-day North Carolina) with over 100 male settlers. However, when Sir Francis Drake arrived at the colony in the summer of 1586, the colonists opted to return to England because there was a lack of supply ships, abandoning the colony. Supply ships arrived at the abandoned colony later in 1586; 15 soldiers were left behind to hold the island, but no trace of these men was later found.

In 1587, Raleigh sent another group to attempt to establish a permanent settlement. The expedition leader, John White, returned to England for supplies that same year but was unable to return to the colony for three years because of the war between England and Spain. When he finally did return in 1590, he found the colony abandoned. The houses were intact, but the colonists had disappeared. Although there are numerous theories about the fate of the colony, it remains a mystery and has come to be known as the "Lost Colony". Two English children were born in this colony; the first was named Virginia Dare (Dare County, North Carolina, was named in her honor), who was among those whose fate is unknown. The word Croatoan was found carved into a tree, the name of a tribe on a nearby island.

=== Virginia Company (1606–1624) ===
Following the failure of the previous colonization attempts, England resumed attempts to set up colonies. This time, joint-stock companies, which were companies with multiple owners who shared in the profit,were used rather than giving extensive grants to a landed proprietor such as Gilbert or Raleigh.

==== Charter of 1606 ====
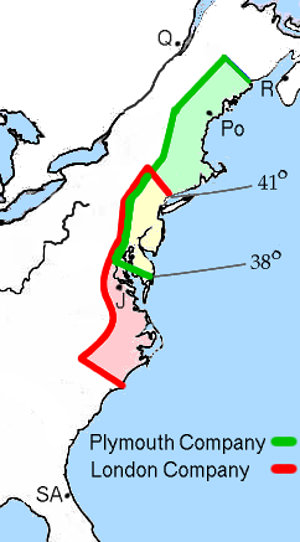
The site of the 1607 Popham Colony is shown by "Po" on the map. The settlement at Jamestown is indicated by "J".

King James granted a proprietary charter to two competing branches of the Virginia Company, which investors supported. These were the Plymouth Company and the Virginia Company of London. By the terms of the charter, the Plymouth Company was permitted to establish a colony of 100 sq mi (260 km^{2}) between the 38th parallel and the 45th parallel (roughly between the Chesapeake Bay and the current U.S.–Canada border). The London Company was permitted to establish between the 34th parallel and the 41st parallel (approximately between Cape Fear and Long Island Sound) and also owned a large portion of Atlantic and Inland Canada. In the area of overlap, the two companies were not permitted to establish colonies within one hundred miles of each other. During 1606, each company organized expeditions to establish settlements within the area of their rights.

The London company formed Jamestown in its exclusive territory, while the Plymouth company formed the Popham Colony in its exclusive territory near what is now Phippsburg, Maine. The Popham colony quickly failed because of famine, disease, and conflicts with local Native American tribes in the first two years.

==== Jamestown ====
The London Company hired Captain Christopher Newport to lead its expedition. On December 20, 1606, he set sail from England with his flagship, the Susan Constant, and two smaller ships, the Godspeed, and the Discovery, with 105 men and boys, plus 39 sailors. After an unusually long voyage of 144 days, they arrived at the mouth of the Chesapeake Bay and came ashore at the point where the southern side of the bay meets the Atlantic Ocean, an event that has come to be called the "First Landing". They erected a cross and named the point of land Cape Henry in honor of Henry Frederick, Prince of Wales, the eldest son of King James.

They were instructed to select a location inland along a waterway where they would be less vulnerable to the Spanish or other Europeans seeking to establish colonies. They sailed westward into the Bay and reached the mouth of Hampton Roads, stopping at a location now known as Old Point Comfort. Keeping the shoreline to their right, they then ventured up the largest river, which they named the James, for their king. After exploring at least as far upriver as the confluence of the Appomattox River at present-day Hopewell, they returned downstream to Jamestown Island, which offered a favorable defensive position against enemy ships and deep water anchorage adjacent to the land. Within two weeks, they had constructed their first fort and named their settlement Jamestown.

In addition to securing gold and other precious minerals to send back to the waiting investors in England, the survival plan for the Jamestown colonists depended upon regular supplies from England and trade with the Native Americans. They selected a location largely cut off from the mainland with little game for hunting, no natural fresh drinking water, and minimal ground for farming. Captain Newport returned to England twice, delivering the first and second supply missions during 1608 and leaving the Discovery for the colonists' use. However, death from disease and conflicts with the Native Americans took a fearsome toll on the colonists. Despite attempts at mining minerals, growing silk, and exporting the native Virginia tobacco, no profitable exports had been identified, and it was unclear whether the settlement would survive financially.

The Powhatan Confederacy was a confederation of numerous linguistically related tribes in the eastern part of Virginia. The Powhatan Confederacy was part of a region known as Tsenacommacah, which roughly corresponded with the Tidewater of Virginia. It was in this territory that the English established Jamestown. At the time of the English arrival, the Powhatan were led by the Mamanatowick, Wahunsenacawh, known to the English as Chief Powhatan.

==== Popham Colony ====
On May 31, 1607, about 100 men and boys left England for what is now Maine. Approximately three months later, the group landed on a wooded peninsula where the Kennebec River meets the Atlantic Ocean and began building Fort St. George. By the end of the year, limited resources caused half of the colonists to return to England. The remaining 45 sailed home late the next year, and the Plymouth company fell dormant.

==== Charter of 1609 – the London company expands ====
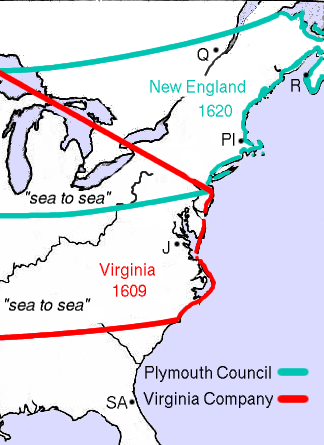
The 1609 charter for the Virginia colony "from sea to sea"

In 1609, with the abandonment of the Plymouth Company settlement, the London Company's Virginia charter was adjusted to include the territory north of the 34th parallel and south of the 40th parallel, with its original coastal grant extended "from sea to sea". Thus, according to James I's writ, the Virginia Colony in its original sense extended to the coast of the Pacific Ocean, in what is now California, with all the land in between belonging to Virginia. For practical purposes, though, the colonists rarely ventured far inland to what was known as the "Virginia Wilderness".

==== Third supply ====
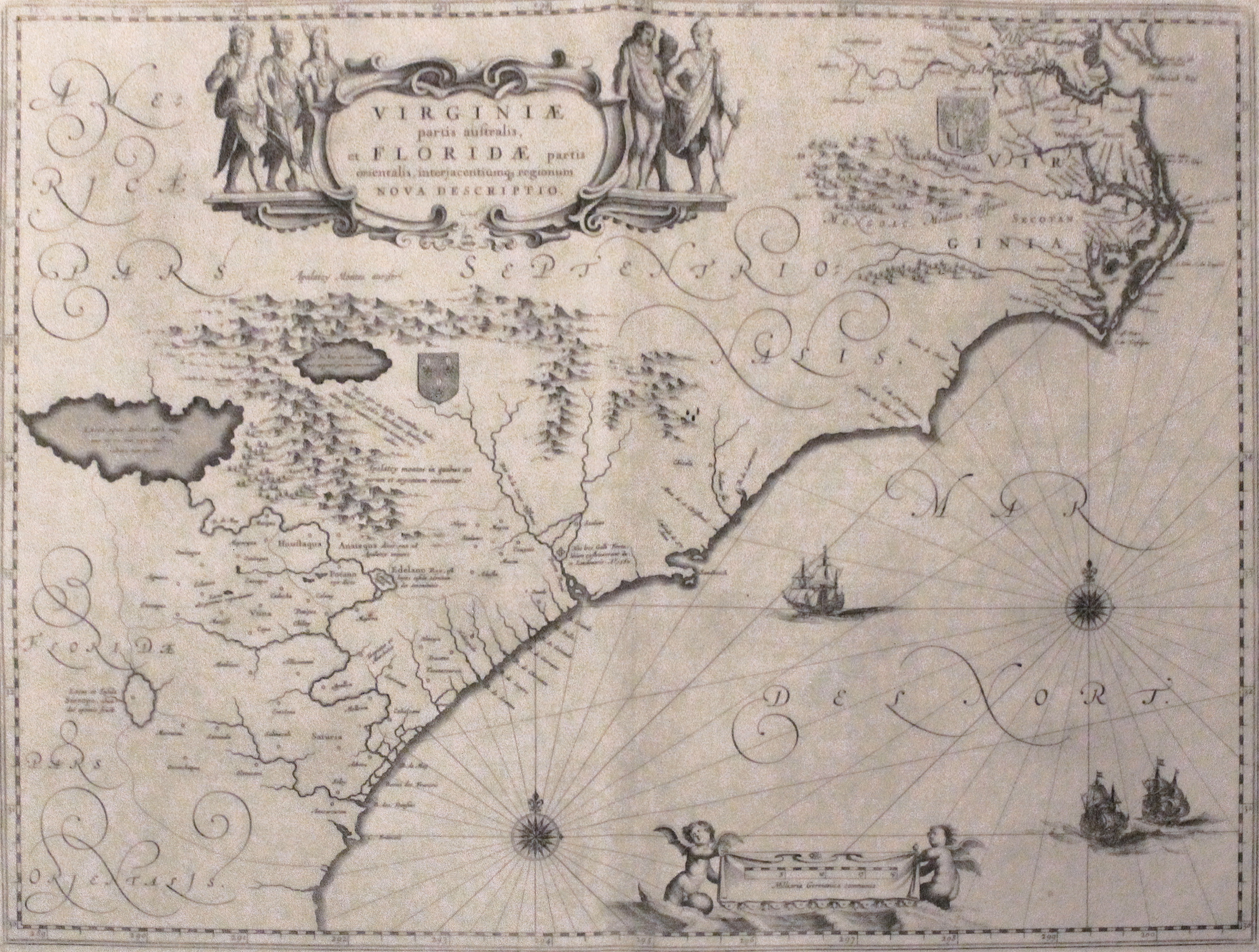
Map depicting the Colony of Virginia (according to the Second Charter), made by Willem Blaeu between 1609 and 1638

For the third supply, the London Company had a new ship built. The Sea Venture was designed to emit additional colonists and transport supplies. It became the flagship of the admiral of the convoy, Sir George Somers. The third supply was the largest, with eight other ships joining the Sea Venture. The captain of the Sea Venture was the mission's Vice Admiral Christopher Newport. Hundreds of new colonists were aboard the ships. However, the weather was to affect the mission drastically.

A few days out of London, the nine ships of the third supply mission encountered a hurricane in the Atlantic Ocean. They became separated during the three days the storm lasted. Admiral Somers had the Sea Venture, carrying most of the mission's supplies, deliberately driven aground onto the reefs of Bermuda to avoid sinking. However, while there was no loss of life, the ship was wrecked beyond repair, stranding its survivors on the uninhabited archipelago, to which they laid claim for England.

The survivors at Bermuda eventually built two smaller ships, and most of them continued to Jamestown, leaving a few on Bermuda to secure the claim. The company's possession of Bermuda was made official in 1612 when the third and final charter extended the boundaries of Virginia far enough out to sea to encompass Bermuda.

Upon their arrival at Jamestown, the survivors of the Sea Venture discovered that the 10-month delay had greatly aggravated other adverse conditions. Seven of the other ships had arrived carrying more colonists but little in the way of food and supplies. Combined with drought and hostile relations with the Native Americans, the loss of the supplies that had been aboard the Sea Venture resulted in the Starving Time in late 1609 to May 1610, during which over 80% of the colonists perished. Conditions were so adverse it appears, from skeletal evidence, that the survivors engaged in cannibalism. The survivors from Bermuda had brought few supplies and food with them, and it appeared to all that Jamestown must be abandoned, and it would be necessary to return to England.

==== Abandonment and fourth supply ====
Statistics regarding mortality rates
Dates	Population	New arrivals
Easter, 1619	~1,000	
Easter, 1620	866	
1620–1621		1,051
Easter 1621	843	
1620–1624		~4,000
Feb 1624	1,277	
During this time, perhaps 5,000 Virginians died of disease or were killed in the Indian massacre of 1622.

Samuel Argall was the captain of one of the seven ships of the third supply that arrived at Jamestown in 1609 after being separated from the Sea Venture, whose fate was unknown. Depositing his passengers and limited supplies, he returned to England with word of the colonists' plight at Jamestown. The king authorized another leader, Thomas West, 3rd Baron De La Warr, later better known as "Lord Delaware", to have greater powers, and the London Company organized another supply mission. They set sail from London on April 1, 1610.

Just after the survivors of the Starving Time and those who had joined them from Bermuda had abandoned Jamestown, the ships of the new supply mission sailed up the James River with food, supplies, a doctor, and more colonists. Lord Delaware was determined that the colony was to survive, and he intercepted the departing ships about 10 miles (16 km) downstream of Jamestown. The colonists thanked Providence for the colony's salvation.

West proved far harsher and more belligerent toward the Indians than any of his predecessors, engaging in wars of conquest against them. He first sent Thomas Gates to drive off the Kecoughtan from their village on July 9, 1610, then gave Chief Powhatan an ultimatum to either return all English subjects and property, or face war. Powhatan responded by insisting that the English either stay in their fort or leave Virginia. Enraged, De la Warr had the hand of a Paspahegh captive cut off and sent him to the Mamanatowick with another ultimatum: Return all English subjects and property, or the neighboring villages would be burned. This time, Powhatan did not respond.

==== First Anglo-Powhatan War (1610–1614) ====
On August 9, 1610, tired of waiting for a response from the Powhatan, West sent George Percy with 70 men to attack the Paspahegh capital, burning the houses and cutting down their cornfields. They killed 65 to 75 Powhatan and captured one of Wowinchopunk's wives and her children. Returning downstream, Percy's men threw the children overboard and shot out "their Braynes in the water". The queen was put to the sword in Jamestown. The Paspahegh never recovered from this attack and abandoned their town. Another small force sent with Argall against the Warraskoyaks found that they had already fled, and they destroyed an abandoned Warraskoyak village and the surrounding cornfields. This event triggered the first Anglo-Powhatan War.

Among the individuals who had briefly abandoned Jamestown was John Rolfe, a Sea Venture survivor who had lost his wife and son in Bermuda. He was a businessman from London with some untried seeds for new, sweeter strains of tobacco he brought from Bermuda and some novel marketing ideas. It would turn out that Rolfe held the key to the colony's economic success. By 1612, Rolfe's strains of tobacco had been successfully cultivated and exported, establishing a first cash crop for export. Plantations and new outposts sprung up starting with Henricus, initially both upriver and downriver along the navigable portion of the James and thereafter along the other rivers and waterways of the area. The settlement at Jamestown could finally be considered permanently established. A period of peace followed the marriage in 1614 of colonist Rolfe to Pocahontas, the daughter of Chief Powhatan.

Another colonial charter was issued in 1611.

==== Second Anglo-Powhatan War (1622–1632) ====
The relations with the Natives took a turn for the worse after the death of Pocahontas in England and the return of Rolfe and other colonial leaders in May 1617. Disease, poor harvests, and the growing demand for land to cultivate tobacco caused hostilities to escalate. After Chief Powhatan died in 1618, he was succeeded by his own younger brother, Opechancanough. On the surface, he maintained friendly relations with the English, negotiating with them through his warrior Nemattanew. Still, by 1622, after Nemattanew had been slain, Opechancanough was ready to order a limited surprise attack on the colonists, hoping to persuade them to move on and settle elsewhere.

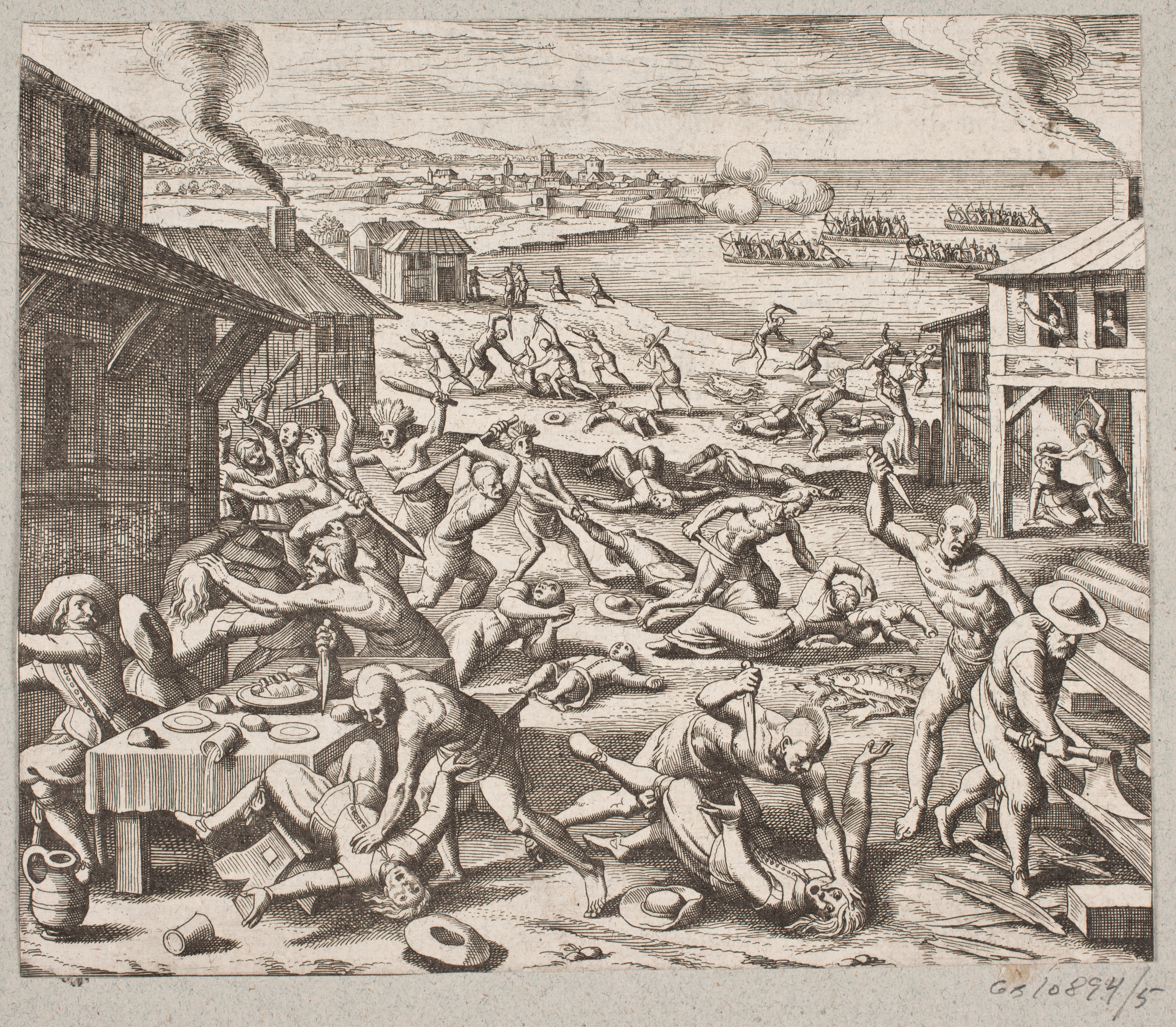
The Indian massacre of 1622, depicted in a 1628 woodcut

Chief Opechancanough organized and led a well-coordinated series of surprise attacks on multiple English colonial settlements along both sides of a 50-mile (80 km) long stretch of the James River, which took place early on the morning of March 22, 1622. This event resulted in the deaths of 347 colonists (including men, women, and children) and the abduction of many others. The massacre caught most of the Virginia Colony by surprise and virtually wiped out several entire communities, including Henricus and Wolstenholme Towne at Martin's Hundred. Jamestown was spared from destruction because an Indian boy named Chanco learned of the planned attacks from his brother and warned colonist Richard Pace with whom he lived. Pace, after securing himself and his neighbors on the south side of the James River, took a canoe across the river to warn Jamestown, which narrowly escaped destruction. However, there was no time to warn the other settlements.

A year later, Captain William Tucker and John Pott worked out a truce with the Powhatan and proposed a toast using liquor laced with poison. 200 Virginia Indians were killed or made ill by the poison, and 50 more were slaughtered by the colonists. For over a decade, the English settlers attacked the Powhatan, targeting their settlements as part of a scorched earth policy. The settlers systematically razed villages, captured children, and seized or destroyed crops.

By 1634, a six-mile-long palisade was completed across the Virginia Peninsula. The palisade provided some security from attacks by the Virginia Indians for colonists farming and fishing lower on the Peninsula from that point. On April 18, 1644, Opechancanough again tried to force the English to abandon the region with another series of coordinated attacks, killing almost 500 colonists. However, this was a smaller proportion of the growing population than had been killed in the 1622 attacks.

=== Crown colony (1624–1652) ===
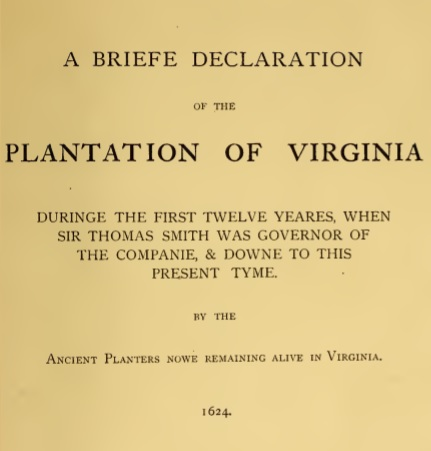
Cover to a history of the Plantation of Virginia between 1612 and 1624, compiled by its planters

In 1620, a successor to the Plymouth Company sent colonists to the New World aboard the Mayflower. Known as Pilgrims, they successfully established a settlement in what became Massachusetts. The portion of what had been Virginia north of the 40th parallel became known as New England, according to books written by Captain John Smith, who had made a voyage there.

In 1624, the charter of the Virginia Company was revoked by King James I, and the Virginia Colony was transferred to royal authority in the form of a crown colony. Subsequent charters for the Maryland Colony in 1632 and to the eight lords proprietors of the Province of Carolina in 1663 and 1665 further reduced the Virginia Colony to roughly the coastal borders it held until the American Revolution. (The border with North Carolina was disputed until surveyed by William Byrd II in 1728.)

==== Third Anglo-Powhatan War (1644–1646) ====
After twelve years of peace following the Indian Wars of 1622–1632, another Anglo–Powhatan War began on March 18, 1644, as a last effort by the remnants of the Powhatan Confederacy, still under Opechancanough, to dislodge the English settlers of the Virginia Colony. Around 500 colonists were killed, but that number represented a relatively low percentage of the overall population, as opposed to the earlier massacre (the 1622 attack had wiped out a third; that of 1644 barely a tenth).

This was followed by an effort by the settlers to decimate the Powhatan. In July, they marched against the Pamunkey, Chickahominy, and Powhatan proper; and south of the James, against the Appomattoc, Weyanoke, Warraskoyak, and Nansemond, as well as two Carolina tribes, the Chowanoke and Secotan. In February–March 1645, the colony ordered the construction of four frontier forts: Fort Charles at the falls of the James, Fort James on the Chickahominy, Fort Royal at the falls of the York and Fort Henry at the falls of the Appomattox, where the modern city of Petersburg is located.

In August 1645, the forces of Governor William Berkeley stormed Opechancanough's stronghold. All captured males in the village over age 11 were deported to Tangier Island. Opechancanough, variously reported to be 92 to 100 years old, was taken to Jamestown. While a prisoner, Opechancanough was shot in the back and killed by a soldier assigned to guard him. His death disintegrated the Powhatan Confederacy into its component tribes, whom the colonists continued to attack.

==== Treaty of 1646 ====
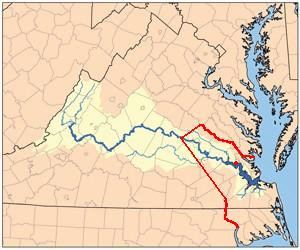
Red line showing the boundary between the Virginia Colony and Tributary Indian tribes established by the Treaty of 1646. The red dot indicates Jamestown, the capital of the Virginia Colony.

In the peace treaty of October 1646, the weroance Necotowance and the subtribes formerly in the confederacy each became tributaries to the King of England. At the same time, a racial frontier was delineated between Indian and English settlements, with members of each group forbidden to cross to the other side except by a special pass obtained at one of the newly erected border forts.

The extent of the Virginia Colony open to patent by English colonists was defined as: All the land between the Blackwater and York rivers, and up to the navigable point of each of the major rivers – which were connected by a straight line running directly from modern Franklin on the Blackwater, northwesterly to the Appomattoc village beside Fort Henry, and continuing in the same direction to the Monocan village above the falls of the James, where Fort Charles was built, then turning sharp right, to Fort Royal on the York (Pamunkey) river. Necotowance thus ceded the English vast tracts of still-uncolonized land, much of it between the James and Blackwater. English settlements on the peninsula north of the York and below the Poropotank were also allowed, as they had already been there since 1640.

=== English Civil War and Commonwealth (1642–1660) ===
While the newer Puritan colonies, most notably Massachusetts, were dominated by Parliamentarians, the older colonies sided with the Crown. The Virginia Company's two settlements, Virginia and Bermuda (Bermuda's Puritans were expelled as the Eleutheran Adventurers, settling the Bahamas under William Sayle), Antigua and Barbados were conspicuous in their loyalty to the Crown and were singled out by the Rump Parliament in An Act for prohibiting Trade with the Barbadoes, Virginia, Bermuda and Antego in October 1650. This dictated that:

[D]ue punishment [be] inflicted upon the said Delinquents, do[es] Declare all and every the said persons in Barbada's, Antego, Bermuda's and Virginia, that have contrived, abetted, aided or assisted those horrid Rebellions, or have since willingly joyned with them, to be notorious Robbers and Traitors, and such as by the Law of Nations are not to be permitted any maner of Commerce or Traffique with any people whatsoever; and do[es] forbid to all maner of persons, Foreiners, and others, all maner of Commerce, Traffique and Correspondency whatsoever, to be used or held with the said Rebels in the Barbada's, Bermuda's, Virginia and Antego, or either of them.

The act authorized Parliamentary privateers to act against English vessels trading with the rebellious colonies: "All Ships that Trade with the Rebels may be surprized. Goods and tackle of such ships not to be embezeled, till judgement in the Admiralty; Two or three of the Officers of every ship to be examined upon oath."

Virginia's population swelled with Cavaliers during and after the English Civil War. Under the tenure of Crown Governor William Berkeley (1642–1652; 1660–1677), the population expanded from 8,000 in 1642 to 40,000 in 1677. Despite the resistance of the Virginia Cavaliers, Virginian Puritan Richard Bennett was made governor answering to Oliver Cromwell in 1652, followed by two more nominal "commonwealth governors". Nonetheless, the colony was rewarded for its loyalty to the Crown by Charles II following the Stuart Restoration when he dubbed it the ''Old Dominion''.

With the Restoration in the English colonies in 1660, the governorship returned to Berkeley. In 1676, Bacon's Rebellion challenged the political order of the colony. While a military failure, its handling resulted in Governor Berkeley being recalled to England. In 1679, the Treaty of Middle Plantation was signed between King Charles II and several Native American groups.

=== Williamsburg era ===
Virginia was the most prominent, wealthiest, and most influential of the American colonies, where conservatives controlled the colonial and local governments. At the local level, Church of England parishes handled many local affairs, and they, in turn, were controlled not by the minister but rather by a closed circle of wealthy landowners who comprised the parish vestry. Ronald L. Heinemann emphasizes the ideological conservatism of Virginia while noting some religious dissenters were gaining strength by the 1760s:

The tobacco planters and farmers of Virginia adhered to the concept of a hierarchical society that they or their ancestors had brought with them from England. Most held to the general idea of a Great Chain of Being: at the top were God and his heavenly host; next came kings...who were divinely sanctioned to rule, then an hereditary aristocracy who were followed in descending order by wealthy landed gentry, small, independent farmers, tenant farmers, servants....Aspirations to rise above one's station in life were considered a sin.

In actual practice, colonial Virginia never had a bishop to represent God nor a hereditary aristocracy with titles like 'duke' or 'baron'. However, it had a royal governor appointed by the king and a powerful landed gentry. The status quo was strongly reinforced by what Thomas Jefferson called "feudal and unnatural distinctions" that were vital to the maintenance of aristocracy in Virginia. He promoted laws such as entail and primogeniture by which the oldest son inherited all the land. As a result, increasingly large plantations, worked by white tenant farmers and by enslaved Black people, gained in size, wealth, and political power in the eastern ("Tidewater") tobacco areas. Maryland and South Carolina had similar hierarchical systems, as did New York and Pennsylvania. During the American Revolutionary era, all such laws were repealed by the new states. The most fervent Loyalists left for Canada or Britain or other parts of the British Empire. They introduced primogeniture in Upper Canada in 1792, lasting until 1851. Such laws lasted in England until 1926.

== Relations with Native Americans ==
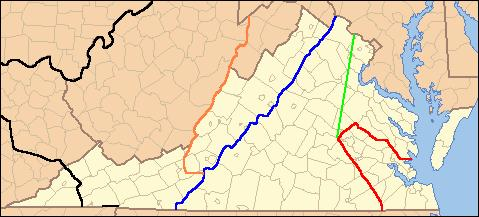
Lines showing the legal treaty frontiers between the Virginia Colony and Indian Nations in various years and today's state boundaries. Red: Treaty of 1646. Green: Treaty of Albany (1684). Blue: Treaty of Albany (1722). Orange: Proclamation of 1763. Black: Treaty of Camp Charlotte (1774). The area west of this line in present-day Southwest Virginia was ceded by the Cherokee in 1775.

As the English expanded out from Jamestown, encroachment of the new arrivals and their ever-growing numbers on what had been Indian lands resulted in several conflicts with the Native American tribes in Virginia. For much of the 17th century, English contact and conflict were mainly with the Algonquian peoples that populated the coastal regions, primarily the Powhatan Confederacy. Following a series of wars and the decline of the Powhatan as a political entity, the colonists expanded westward in the late 17th and 18th centuries, encountering the Shawnee, Iroquoian-speaking peoples such as the Nottoway, Meherrin, Iroquois, and Cherokee, as well as Siouan-speaking peoples such as the Tutelo, Saponi, and Occaneechi.

=== Iroquois Confederacy ===
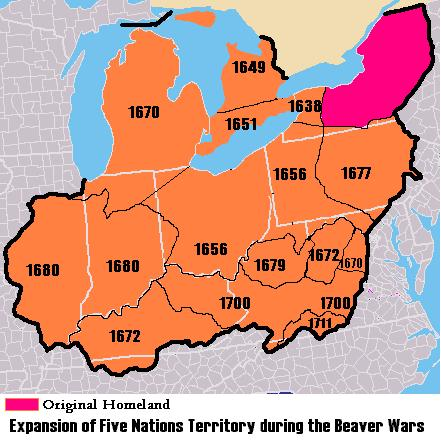
Map of the Iroquois expansion during the Beaver Wars, 1638–1711

As the English settlements expanded beyond the Tidewater territory traditionally occupied by the Powhatan, they encountered new groups with which there had been minimal relations with the colony. In the late 17th century, the Iroquois Confederacy expanded into the western region of Virginia as part of the Beaver Wars. They arrived shortly before the English settlers and displaced the resident tribes.

Lt. Gov. Alexander Spotswood made further advances in policy with the Virginia Indians along the frontier. In 1714, he established Fort Christanna to help educate and trade with several tribes with which the colony had friendly relations and to help protect them from hostile tribes. In 1722, the Treaty of Albany was signed by leaders of the Five Nations of Iroquois, Province of New York, Colony of Virginia, and Province of Pennsylvania.

== Geography ==
The geography of the Virginia settlement expanded as the boundaries of European colonization extended over time. Its cultural geography gradually evolved, with various settlement and jurisdiction models employed. By the late 17th century and the early 18th century, the primary settlement pattern was based on plantations (to grow tobacco), farms, and some towns (mostly ports or courthouse villages).

=== Early settlements ===
The fort at Jamestown, founded in 1607, remained the primary settlement of the colonists for several years. A few strategic outposts were constructed, including Fort Algernon (1609) at the entrance to the James River. Early attempts to occupy strategic locations already inhabited by natives at what is now Richmond and Suffolk failed owing to native resistance.

A short distance farther up the James, in 1611, Thomas Dale began the construction of a progressive development at Henricus on and about what was later known as Farrar's Island. Henricus was envisioned as a possible replacement capital for Jamestown and was to have the first college in Virginia. (The ill-fated Henricus was destroyed during the Indian massacre of 1622). In addition to creating the settlement at Henricus, Dale also established the port town of Bermuda Hundred, as well as "Bermuda Cittie" in 1613, now part of Hopewell, Virginia. He began the excavation work at Dutch Gap, using methods he had learned while serving in Holland.

=== "Hundreds" ===
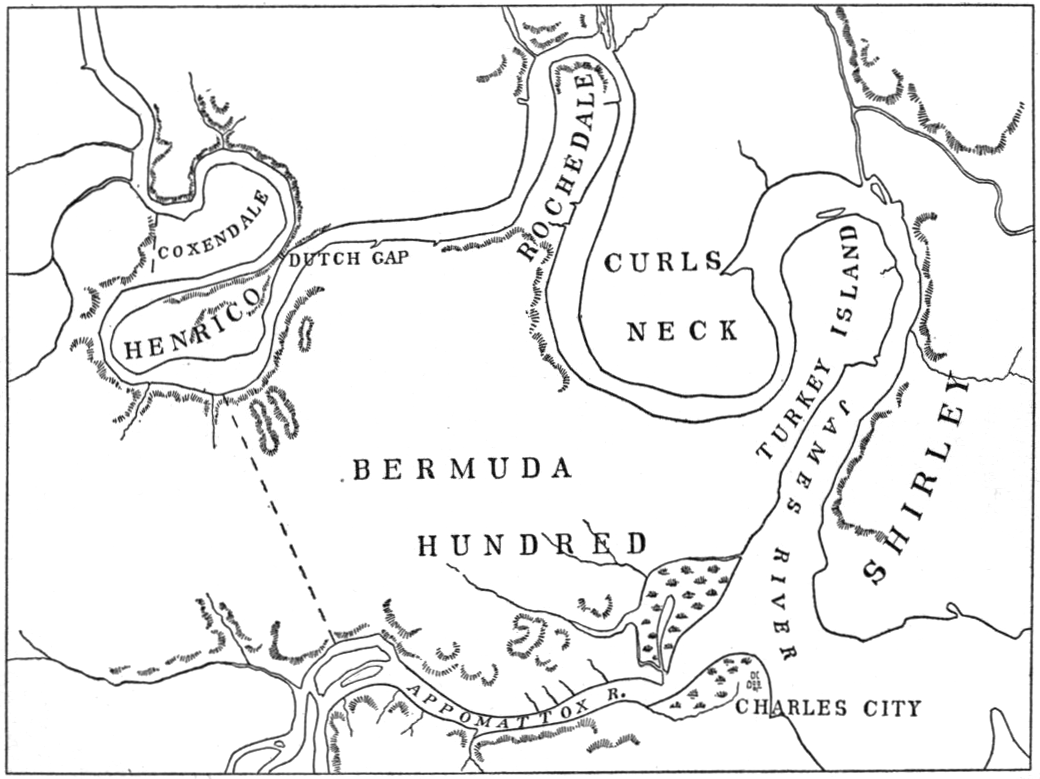
Bermuda Hundred and other early English settlements upriver of Jamestown

Once tobacco had been established as an export cash crop, investors became more interested, and groups of them united to create largely self-sufficient "hundreds". The term "hundred" is a traditional English name for an administrative division of a shire (or county) to define an area that would support one hundred heads of household. In the colonial era in Virginia, the "hundreds" were large developments of many acres, necessary to support tobacco crops. The "hundreds" were required to be at least several miles from any existing community. Soon, these patented tracts of land sprang up along the rivers. The investors sent shiploads of settlers and supplies to Virginia to establish the new developments. The administrative centers of Virginia's hundreds were essentially small towns or villages and were often palisaded for defense.

An example was Martin's Hundred, located downstream from Jamestown on the north bank of the James River. The Martin's Hundred Society, a group of investors in London, sponsored it. It was settled in 1618, and Wolstenholme Towne was its administrative center, named for John Wolstenholme, one of the investors.

Bermuda Hundred (now in Chesterfield County) and Flowerdew Hundred (now in Prince George County) are other names which have survived over centuries. Others included Berkeley Hundred, Bermuda Nether Hundred, Bermuda Upper Hundred, Smith's Hundred, Digges Hundred, West Hundred, and Shirley Hundred (and, in Bermuda, Harrington Hundreds). Including the creation of the "hundreds", the various incentives to investors in the Virginia Colony finally paid off by 1617. By this time, the colonists were exporting 50,000 pounds of tobacco to England per year and were beginning to generate enough profit to ensure the economic survival of the colony.

=== Cities, shires, and counties ===
In 1619, the plantations and developments were divided into four "incorporations" or "citties", as they were called. These were Charles Cittie, Elizabeth Cittie, Henrico Cittie, and James Cittie, which included the relatively small seat of government for the colony at Jamestown Island. Each of the four "citties" (sic) extended across the James River, the main conduit of transportation of the era. Elizabeth Cittie, known initially as Kecoughtan (a Native word with many variations in spelling by the English), also included the areas now known as South Hampton Roads and the Eastern Shore.

In 1634, a local government system was created in the Virginia Colony by order of the King of England. Eight shires were designated, each with local officers. Within a few years, the shires were renamed counties, a system that has remained to the present day.

=== Later settlements ===
In 1630, under the governorship of John Harvey, the first settlement on the York River was founded. In 1632, the Virginia legislature voted to build a fort to link Jamestown and the York River settlement of Chiskiack and protect the colony from Indian attacks. In 1634, a palisade was built near Middle Plantation. This wall stretched across the peninsula between the York and James rivers and protected the settlements on the eastern side of the lower peninsula from Indians. The wall also served to contain cattle.

In 1699, a capital was established and built at Middle Plantation, soon renamed Williamsburg.

=== Northern Neck Proprietary ===
In the period following the English Civil War, the exiled King Charles II hoped to shore up the loyalty of several of his supporters by granting them a significant area of mostly uncharted land to control as a proprietary in Virginia (a claim that would only be valid were the king to return to power). While under the jurisdiction of the Virginia Colony, the proprietary maintained complete control of the granting of land within that territory (and revenues obtained from it) until after the American Revolution. The grant was for the land between the Rappahannock and Potomac Rivers, which included the titular Northern Neck, but as time went on, also would include all of what is today Northern Virginia and into West Virginia. Due to ambiguities of the text of the various grants causing disputes between the proprietary and the colonial government, the tract was finally demarcated via the Fairfax Line in 1746.

== Government and law ==
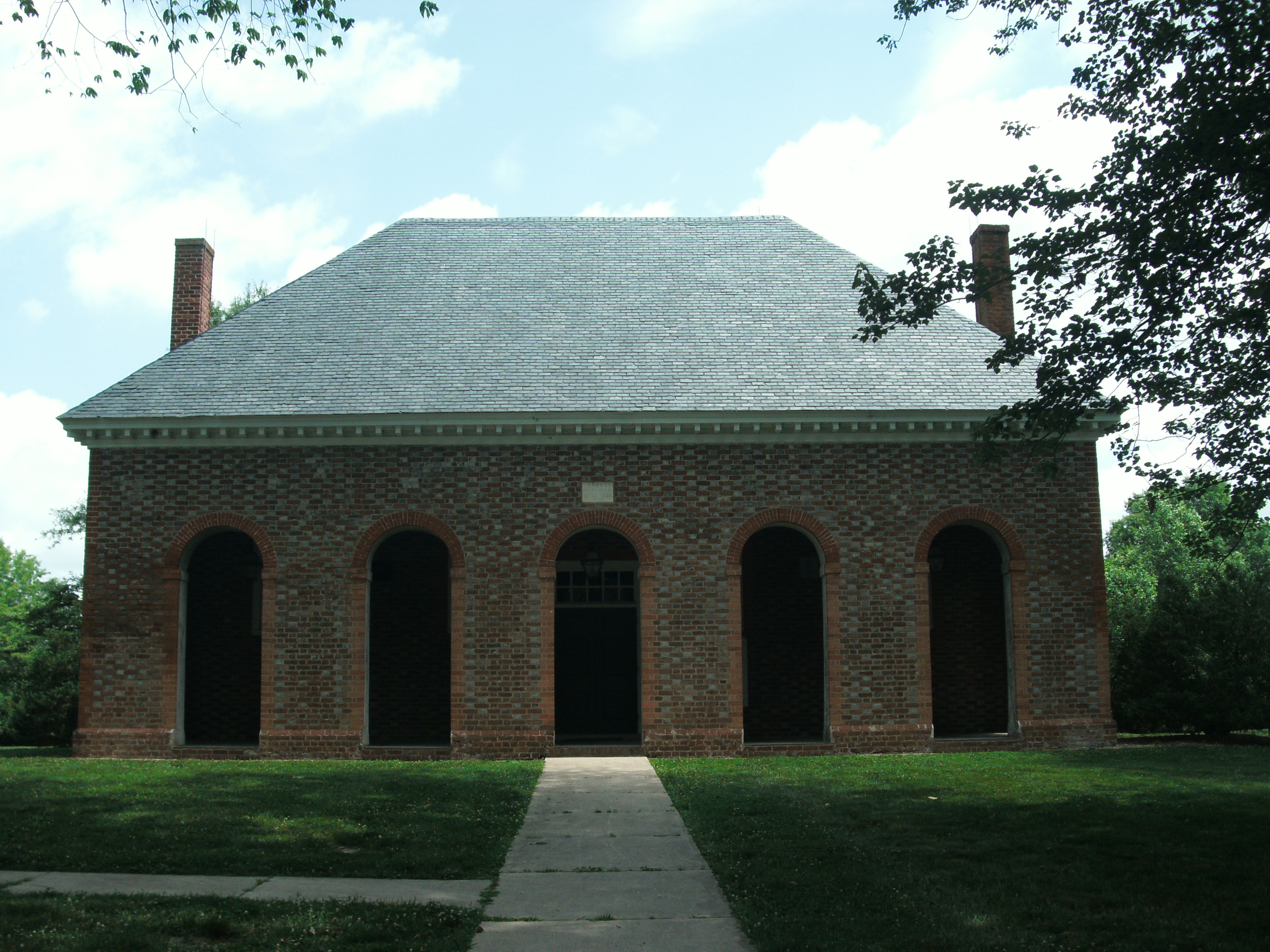
Hanover County Courthouse (c. 1735–1742), with its arcaded front, is typical of a numerous colonial courthouse built in Virginia.

In the initial years under the Virginia Company, the colony was governed by a council, headed by a council president. From 1611 to 1618, under the orders of Sir Thomas Dale, the settlers of the colony were under a regime of civil law that became known as Dale's Code. Under a charter from the company in 1618, a new model of governance was put in place in 1619, which created a House of Burgesses. On July 30, 1619, burgesses met at Jamestown Church as the first elected representative legislative assembly in the New World. The legal system in the colony was thereafter based on the provisions of its royal charter and English common law.

For much of the history of the royal colony, the formally appointed governor was absentee, often remaining in England. In his stead, a series of acting or lieutenant governors who were physically present held actual authority. In the later years of its history, as it became increasingly civilized, more governors made the journey.

The first settlement in the colony, Jamestown, served as the capital and main port of entry from its founding until 1699. During this time, a series of statehouses (capitols) were used and subsequently consumed by fires (accidental and intentional in the case of Bacon's Rebellion). Following such a fire, in 1699, the capital was relocated inland, away from the swampy clime of Jamestown, to Middle Plantation, renamed Williamsburg. The capital of Virginia remained in Williamsburg until it was moved further inland to Richmond in 1779 during the American Revolution.

== Economy ==
The entrepreneurs of the Virginia Company experimented with several means of making the colony profitable. The orders sent with the first colonists instructed that they search for precious metals (specifically gold). While no gold was found, various products were sent back, including pitch and clapboard. In 1608, early attempts were made at breaking the Continental hold on glassmaking through the creation of a glassworks. In 1619, the colonists built the first ironworks in North America.

In 1612, settler John Rolfe planted tobacco obtained from Bermuda (during his stay there as part of the third supply). Within a few years, the crop proved extremely lucrative in the European market. As the English increasingly used tobacco products, the production of tobacco in the American colonies became a significant economic driver, especially in the tidewater region surrounding the Chesapeake Bay. From 1616 to 1619, the only exports of the colony were tobacco and sassafras.

Colonists developed plantations along the rivers of Virginia, and social/economic systems developed to grow and distribute this cash crop. Some elements of this system included the importation and use of enslaved Africans to cultivate and process crops, which included harvesting and drying periods. Planters would have their workers fill large hogsheads with tobacco and convey them to inspection warehouses. In 1730, the Virginia House of Burgesses standardized and improved the quality of tobacco exported by establishing the Tobacco Inspection Act of 1730, which required inspectors to grade tobacco at 40 specified locations.

== Culture ==
=== Population ===
Historical population
Year	Pop.	±%
1620	2,200	—
1630	2,500	+13.6%
1640	10,442	+317.7%
1650	18,731	+79.4%
1660	27,020	+44.3%
1670	35,309	+30.7%
1680	43,596	+23.5%
1690	53,046	+21.7%
1700	58,560	+10.4%
1710	78,281	+33.7%
1720	87,757	+12.1%
1730	114,000	+29.9%
1740	180,440	+58.3%
1750	231,033	+28.0%
1760	339,726	+47.0%
1770	447,016	+31.6%
1780	538,004	+20.4%
Source: 1620–1760; 1770–1780

=== Ethnic origins ===
England supplied most colonists; a later migration of Scots-Irish filled the backcountry. The Virginia Colony was always predominantly British in ethnic descent, with only minor contributions from other ethnic groups, particularly Palatinate Germans. In 1608, the first Poles and Slovaks arrived as part of a group of skilled craftsmen. In 1619, the first Africans arrived. Many more Africans were imported as enslaved people, such as Angela. In the early 17th century, French Huguenots arrived in the colony as refugees from religious warfare.

In the early 18th century, indentured German-speaking colonists from the iron-working region of Nassau-Siegen arrived to establish the Germanna settlement. Scots-Irish settled on the Virginia frontier. Some Welsh arrived, including some ancestors of Thomas Jefferson.

=== Servitude and slavery ===
With the boom in tobacco planting, there was a severe shortage of laborers to work the labor-intensive crop. One method to solve the shortage was using indentured servants.

By the 1640s, legal documents started to define indentured servants' changing nature and status as servants. In 1640, John Punch was sentenced to lifetime servitude as punishment for trying to escape from his enslaver, Hugh Gwyn. This is the earliest legal sanctioning of slavery in Virginia. After this trial, the relationship between indentured servants and their masters changed, as planters saw permanent servitude a more appealing and profitable prospect than seven-year indentures.

As many indentured workers were illiterate, especially Africans, there were opportunities for abuse by planters and other indenture holders. Some ignored the expiration of servants' indentured contracts and tried to keep them as lifelong workers. One example is with Anthony Johnson, who argued with Robert Parker, another planter, over the status of John Casor, formerly an indentured servant of his. Johnson argued that his indenture was for life and Parker had interfered with his rights. The court ruled in favor of Johnson and ordered that Casor be returned to him, where he served the rest of his life as an enslaved person. Such documented cases marked the transformation of Black Africans from indentured servants into slaves.

In the late 17th century, the Royal African Company, which the King of England established to supply the great demand for labor to the colonies, had a monopoly on providing enslaved Africans to the colony. As plantation agriculture was established earlier in Barbados, in the early years, enslaved people were shipped from Barbados (where they were seasoned) to the colonies of Virginia and Carolina.

=== Religion ===
In 1619, the Anglican Church was formally established as the official Christian religion in the colony and would remain so until shortly after the American Revolution. Establishment meant that local tax funds paid the parish costs and that the parish had local civic functions such as poor relief. The upper-class planters controlled the vestry, which ran the parish and chose the minister. The church in Virginia was controlled by the Bishop of London, who sent priests and missionaries, but there were never enough, and they reported deficient standards of personal morality. By the 1760s, dissenting Protestants, especially Baptists and Methodists, were proliferating and started challenging the Anglicans for moral leadership.

All 26 churches with regular services in Virginia in 1650 were Anglican, which included all but 4 of the 30 Anglican churches in the colonies at the time (with the remainder located in Maryland). Following the First Great Awakening (1730–1755), the number of regular places of worship in Virginia grew to 126 in 1750 (96 Anglican, 17 Presbyterian, 5 Lutheran, 5 German Reformed, and 3 Baptist), with the colony gaining an additional 251 regular places of worship to a total of 377 by 1776 (101 Baptist, 95 Presbyterian, 94 Episcopal, 42 Friends, 17 Lutheran, 14 German Reformed, 10 Methodism, 2 German Baptist Brethren, and 2 Mennonite).

=== Education and literacy ===
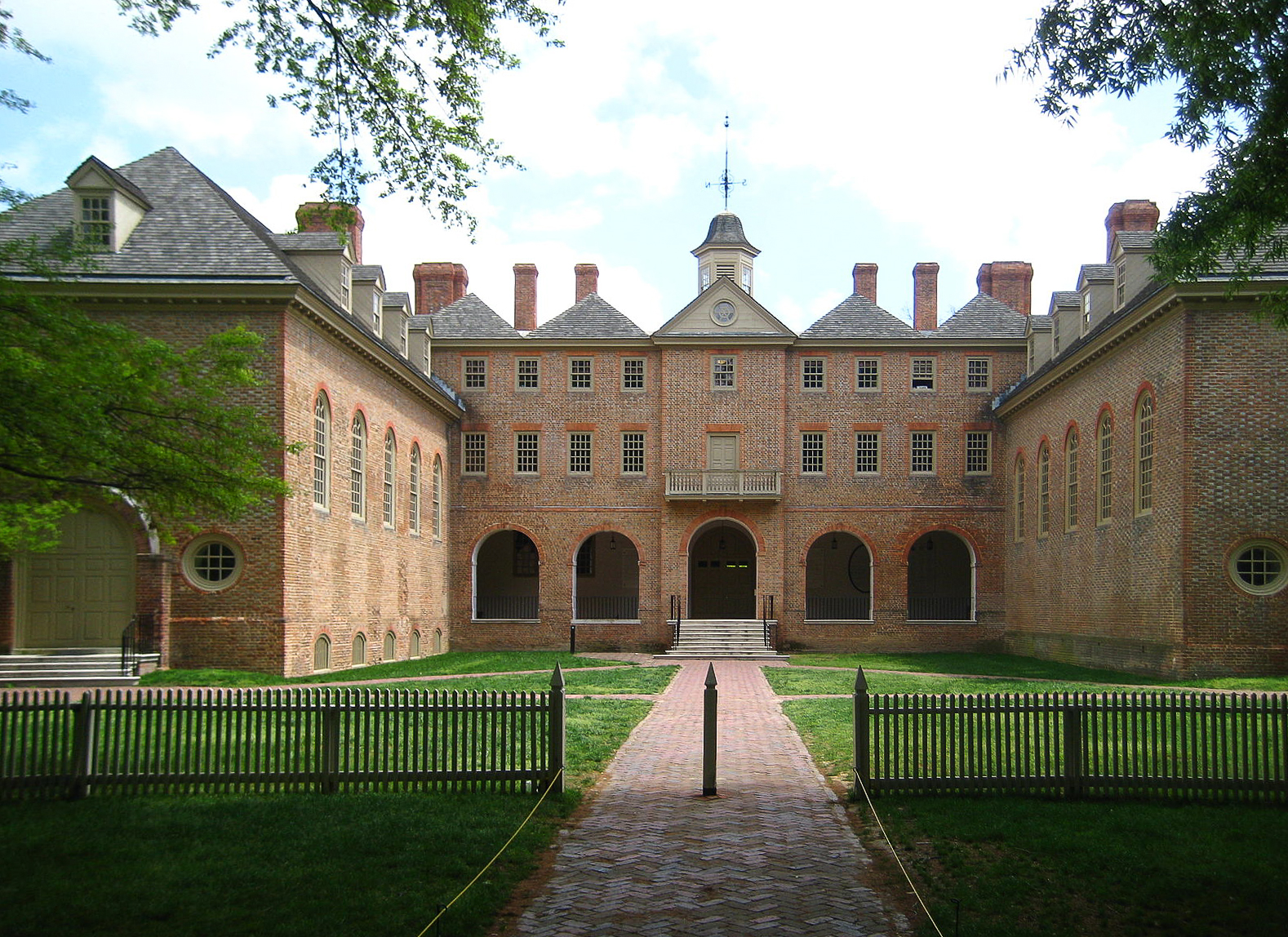
Rear view of the Wren Building at the College of William & Mary, begun in 1695

The first printing press used in Virginia began operation in Jamestown on June 8, 1680, though within a few years, it was shut down by the Governor and Crown of England for want of a license. It was not until 1736 that the first newspaper, the Virginia Gazette, began circulation under printer William Parks of Williamsburg.

The Syms-Eaton Academy, started in 1634, became America's first free public school. Private tutors were often favored among those families who could afford them.

For most of the 17th century, a university education for settlers of Virginia required a journey to England or Scotland. Such journeys were undertaken by wealthy young men. In the early years, many settlers received their education before immigrating to the colony.

In 1693, the College of William & Mary was founded at Middle Plantation (soon renamed Williamsburg). The college included a common school for Virginia Indians, supplemented by local pupils, which lasted until a 1779 overhaul of the institution's curriculum. The college, located in the capital and heart of the Tidewater region, dominated the colony's intellectual climate until after independence.

After 1747, some Virginians began to attend institutions at Princeton and Philadelphia. Generations began to move west into the Piedmont and Blue Ridge areas. In this region of Virginia, two future Presbyterian colleges trace their origins to lower-level institutions founded in this period. First, what would become Hampden–Sydney College was founded in 1775, before the American Revolution. Likewise, Augusta Academy was a classical school that would evolve into Washington and Lee University (though it would not grant its first bachelor's degree until 1785).

== See also ==
- English colonial empire
- Former counties, cities, and towns of Virginia
- History of Virginia
- History of Virginia on stamps
- Jamestown Exposition
- List of colonial governors of Virginia
- Southern Colonies
- Anne Orthwood's bastard trial, showing the development of law in the Colony of Virginia
