= Walter Shelley =

Early Virginia settler and original member of the House of Burgesses

Walter Shelley sailed to the English colony at Jamestown, Virginia before 1619.

Walter Shelley was one of the original subscribers to the London Company. He was a member of the First Legislative Assembly in America and sat for Smith's Hundred when they met at Jamestown on July 30, 1619. His name appears on a monument to the first House of Burgesses which stands at Jamestown today.

Shelley died of fever in 1619, very shortly after the Assembly began. It was thought by most scholars that he was related to the Percy Bysshe Shelley family.
