= Elizabeth City (Virginia Company) =

17th century Virginia Company settlement

Coordinates: 37°4′N 76°22′W

Elizabeth City (or Elizabeth Cittie [sic] as it was then called) was one of four incorporations established in the Virginia Colony in 1619 by the proprietor, the Virginia Company of London, acting in accordance with instructions issued by Sir George Yeardley, Governor. This allowed the crown to benefit from the offerings of the new land, including its natural resources, new markets for English goods, and the leverage it provided against the Spanish.

The plantations and developments were divided into four political divisions, called "incorporations", "burroughs", or "cities". These were James City, Charles City, Henrico City, and Kiccowtan or Kecoughtan (later Elizabeth City). Each of the four "citties" [sic] extended across the James River, the main conduit of transportation of the era.

Elizabeth City was located at the mouth of the James River where it meets with Chesapeake Bay. This was crucial to the development of the settlement because it put it in control of transportation on the James River. Settlers who came on ships were first welcomed to Elizabeth City before they moved on to the larger settlement of Jamestown.

== Evolution of Elizabeth City ==
The land Elizabeth City was situated on what was inhabited by The Powhatan who had recently expelled another indigenous group from the land before the English had arrived. The English settlers arrived in the area in 1607 when ships such as the Susan Constant, Godspeed, and Discovery stopped nearby at Portcomfort. Kecoughtan was an Indigenous settlement on the land that the settlers claimed, they took over the settlement while the Powhatan men were out hunting. The early years of Elizabeth City were harsh with starvation, disease and armed conflict with local Indigenous peoples causing the site to be nearly abandoned. It was not completely abandoned, however, due to John Rolfe's tobacco planting in Elizabeth City and the surrounding area.

In 1619 the General Assembly chose to rename Kecoughtan, Elizabeth City in honour of the daughter of King James I, the new Queen of Bohemia. In 1634, under the authority of Charles I of England, Virginia was divided into eight counties, or shires.^{[2]} One of them was Elizabeth City Shire, later Elizabeth City County. Originally the Shire included land on both sides of the James River, but in 1636 the creation of New Norfolk County resulted in the loss of the land south of the River. In 1908 the territory of Elizabeth City County was reduced when Hampton became an independent city. Elizabeth City County was the first of the original Virginian shires to disappear when in 1952 the County consolidated into the City of Hampton.

== Relations with Native Americans ==
=== Elizabeth City Pre-colonization ===
Indigenous peoples have been living in Virginia for over 12,000 years. The Powhatan Confederacy inhabited the land of Elizabeth City pre-1607 and was made up of over 30 tribes, all governed by the Powhatan, titled Mamanatowick and his council of advisors. These tribes were acquired through marriage alliances and alliances against a common threat. The Confederacy controlled about 100 miles by 100 miles of land and had a population of about 25,000 people before the English arrived.

=== Post-colonization Native Americans Interactions with Settlers ===
Post-colonization the Powhatan population decreased due to the diseases the English settlers brought with them that the tribe had no immunity to.

In the winter of 1607, as a sign of peace, the Mamanatowick of the Powhatan Confederacy sent gifts to settlements near Elizabeth City such as Jamestown which were often accompanied by his daughter Pocahontas. In 1614 Pocahontas married the settler John Rolfe which aided peaceful relations between the Confederacy and settlers for a few years. However, the Indian Massacre of 1622 (as called by the settlers) was a low point in Indigenous-settler relations. About 350-400 settlers were killed in the conflict, a large percent of the Virginia population of the time. Although Elizabeth City was spared, the proximity it had to the affected settlements meant that the population grew dramatically. More conflicts arose after the Indian Massacre of 1622 and continued for the next ten years. By 1630 Col. William Claiborne set up a store to trade with Native Americans.

== Political and legal workings ==
In 1619 a representational government, governed by the colonists, was formed in Virginia. By 1624, Elizabeth City had its own local court. Being a Justice was a lifetime appointment with no pay. These men were often wealthy landowners and merchants from the area.

Adam Thorowgood lived in Elizabeth City and was appointed to the position of commissioner of Elizabeth City’s monthly court in 1628. Although Adam was considered an upper-class man in Virginia, he did not start as such. In 1621, 17-year-old Adam Thorowgood arrived in the colony as an indentured servant. The four other justices at the same time as Thorowgood were John Sibsey and Henry Seawell, who were Burgesses, and Francis Mason and William Julian who were established Ancient Planters. Ancient planters were early colonists that migrated to Virginia and in 1618 were given free land, so despite their previous standing, they were considered wealthy members of the colonies.

The Court in Elizabeth City fell within the tradition of English common law and many cases relied on the teams of justices to use their collective wisdom, governmental experience, and Christian ethics to reach a conclusion. Although, none of the justices had any legal training, they were still trusted to protect all colonial citizens based on their good judgment.

== History of Elizabeth City ==
Captain William Neuce, who moved to Elizabeth City in 1620, had brought 1,000 settlers to Virginia by 1625. This drastically increasing the population of settlements and in exchange he was given a title and a plantation. As Elizabeth City and the surrounding area was in need of a larger population, deals such as this were common. For example, Daniel Gookin Sr. who arrived in the colony from Ireland in 1621 brought 30 passengers creating an Irish population in Elizabeth City. Another effort to increase the population was the “Maids to Make Wives" program. It was formed in England and recognized the importance of increasing the population in Virginia so it could be self-sustaining. Lower-class women were brought from England to the colonies to marry the settlers and in exchange they received a fresh start and security. As a result of these population increases, by 1624 Elizabeth City had a population of 349 and by 1629 it had become a large and important settlement.

Elizabeth City was firmly Anglican and from the beginning continuously had both a church and clergy which was unusual for the area. A third church was added in 1667 to keep up with the growing population. In addition, 'Welcome buildings' for new immigrants opened in the 1620s.

Another factor that attracted people to Elizabeth City was agriculture. In 1617 French colonists tried growing grape vines and later in 1620 the cultivation of silk was experimented with. Both had little success. Other crops had much success such as tobacco and by 1628 Elizabeth City and the surrounding area were full of peach farms. Another draw to the area was the cheap farm land. In 1626, one 150 acres farm was sold for 100 pounds of English money. Leased land was also available as a cheaper option.

== See also ==
- Elizabeth City Shire (1634-1643)
- Elizabeth City County (1643-1952)
- Hampton, Virginia (1952-)
