= City of Henrico (Virginia Company) =

Early colonial incorporation in Virginia

Coordinates: 37°22′54″N 77°20′09″W

- Colonial incorporation of England
- 1619–1634
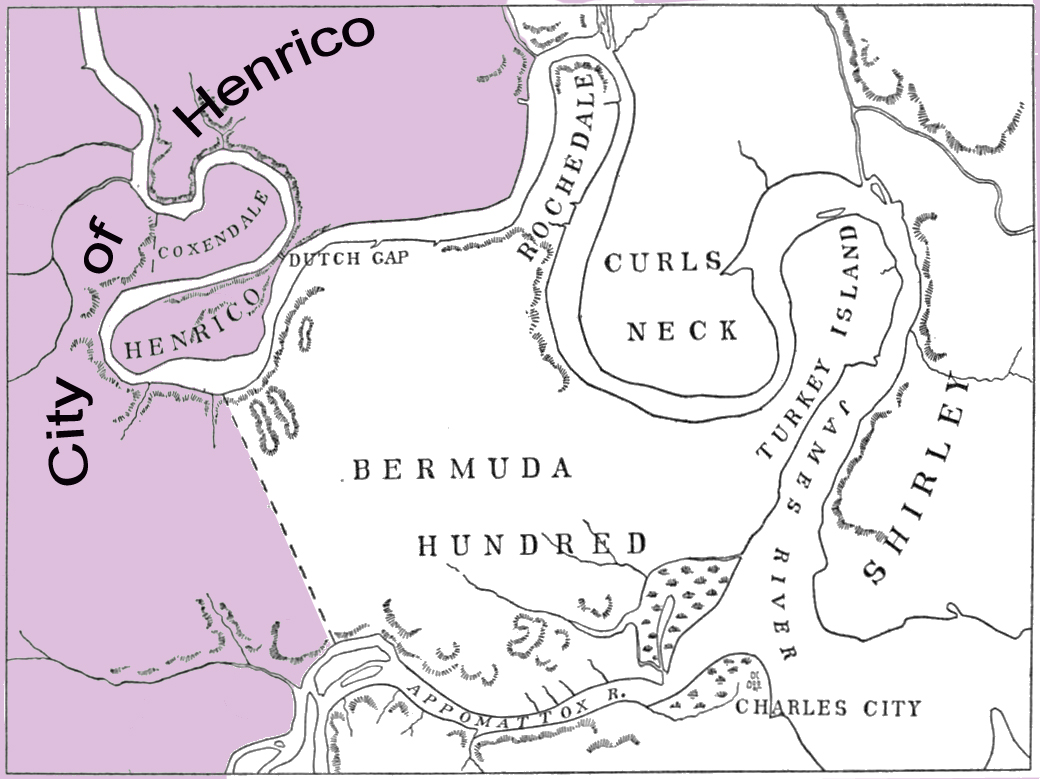
- Approximate boundaries of the City of Henrico in 1619 (in purple) as described by Alexander Brown.
- History
  - Instructions from Virginia Company create City of Henrico: 1619
  - Powhatan attack destroys Henricus: 1622
  - Virginia becomes royal colony: 1624
  - Shire of Henrico established: 1634
- Today part of: Virginia, United States of America

The City of Henrico (also known as Henrico) is one of the oldest counties in the Colony of Virginia. It was one of four incorporations established in the colony by its proprietor, the Virginia Company. The City of Henrico, which included the settlement of Henricus, was the furthest incorporation upstream on the James River. In 1634, Henrico was reorganized under royal authority as the shire of Henrico, one of eight shires in the Crown Colony of Virginia, Later, it became known as Henrico County, Virginia.

== History ==
The City of Henrico was formed in 1618 when the Virginia Company, the proprietor of the colony of Virginia, provided instructions to Governor Sir George Yeardley for the reorganization of the colony's government. These instructions provided for the incorporation of most of the plantations and developments of Virginia into four boroughs or cities that extended across the James River, the main conduit of transportation of the era. These incorporations were called James City, Charles City, Kiccowtan (Note: Kiccowtan, whose modern spelling is Kecoughtan, was renamed Elizabeth City in 1620 by the Virginia Company in response to the legislative assembly in Virginia's petition to change Kiccowtan's "savage" name) and Henrico. The seat of the colony's government was in Virginia's only major town, Jamestown in James City.

The City of Henrico's major settlement was the fortified town of Henricus, which was founded by Sir Thomas Dale on what is now known as Farrar's Island, near the location of the Dutch Gap Canal today. Henrico had been founded to eventually replace Jamestown as a healthier and militarily more secure seat of the colony's government. By 1612, Alexander Whitaker, the "apostle to Virginia" who married John Rolfe and Pocahontas, became Henricus's first minister the surrounding lands were designated for the first English college in North America,. and the Falling Creek Ironworks, the first iron production facility in North America, were founded there.

However, by the time the City of Henrico was incorporated in 1619, the town of Henricus was already in a state of dilapidation. The town, the ironworks, and the plan for a college was abandoned after the Powhatan attack of 1622. Initially, the attack had an adverse effect on Henrico's settlement: 1624, 29 people as living in Henrico, all on the former college lands and in 1625, 22 people were listed as living there. However, the City of Henrico's population continued to increase in the following decade.

== Jurisdiction ==
In 1619, the original area of the City of Henrico included the northernmost region of the colony. The northern section incorporated lands around Henricus and Farrar's Island, as well as the settlements of Coxendale, which was on the south bank of the James just east of Farrar's Island, and Arrohattock, which was further upstream from Henricus; South of Farrar's Island, the city included the lands west of Dale's Pale, a defensive work with palisades and a ditch that crossed the neck of the Bermuda Hundred Peninsula from the James river to the falls of the Appomattox River. The city boundaries ended on the Appomattox, where it bordered Charles City.

At its founding, the City of Henrico did not have a governmental seat. All legal issues in the City of Henrico were originally adjudicated by the governor and councillors in Jamestown who served as the Council Court. In 1626, the Council of Virginia established a monthly court, which could meet either at Jordan's Journey or Shirley Hundred. Both of these locations were in Charles City, but they served the "Upper Parts" of the James River, which included both Charles City and Henrico. These courts handled civil cases concerning amounts under the value of 100 pounds of tobacco in 1626 (Note: During the time between 1619 and 1630, tobacco was the primary currency in the colony), which was increased to five pounds sterling in 1632. There were six commissioners in the monthly court of the Upper Parts. The councillor William Farrar served as the city's head commissioner from the founding of the court in 1626 to after his reappointment in 1632 by Governor Sir John Harvey, being given the choice of where court was to be held in the 1626 commission and explicitly required to be present at all cases and having the authority to hand down final decision on all cases in the 1632 reappointment However criminal cases, civil cases involving large amounts of money, and appeals of decisions by the monthly court were decided by the Council Court in Jamestown.

== The Shire of Henrico ==
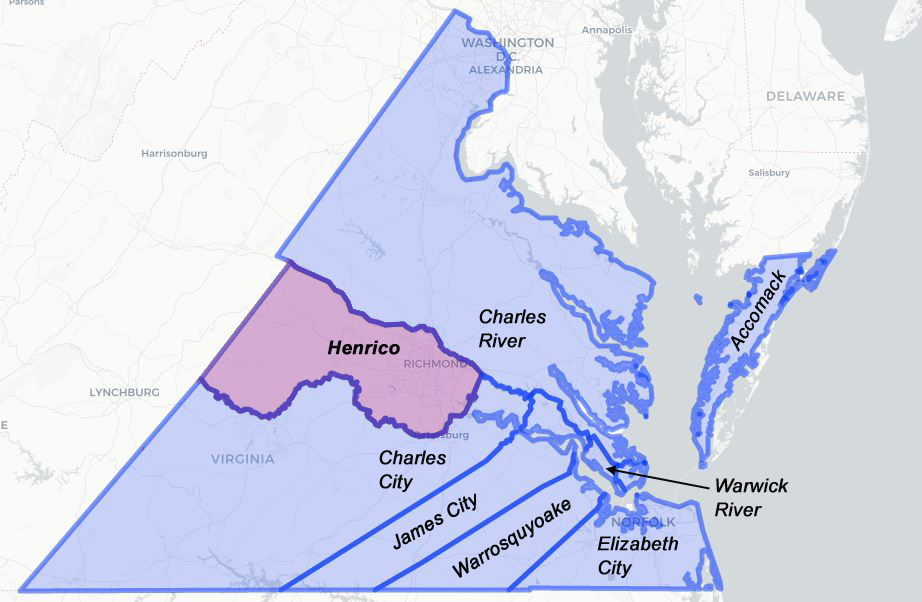
The eight shires of Virginia created in 1634 with Henrico in purple

In 1634, City of Henrico became the Shire of Henrico, one of eight shires in the Royal Colony of Virginia. The shire was apportioned lands formerly belonging to Charles City, including Bermuda Hundred and more easterly parts of the northern bank of the James River. The boundaries of Henrico shire was the Chickahominy River in the north, Turkey Creek and the Appomattox River in the east, the Appomattox River in the south, with the west remaining unbounded. By 1642, the Shire of Henrico was already being referred to by its current name, Henrico County, during legislative sessions.

The county seat of Henrico was established at Varina Plantation and a courthouse was built there sometime before 1688. The courthouse remained at Varina until 1752, when a new one was built in Richmond.
