= New Norfolk County, Virginia =

Colonial Virginia county

Coordinates: 36°45′N 76°20′W

New Norfolk County is a long-extinct county which was located in colonial Virginia from 1636 until 1637.

It was formed in 1636 from Elizabeth City Shire, one of the eight original shires (or counties) formed in 1634 in the colony of Virginia by direction of the King of England. New Norfolk County included all the area in South Hampton Roads now incorporated in the five independent cities located there in modern times.

The following year, in 1637, it was divided into Upper Norfolk County and Lower Norfolk County.

Upper Norfolk County became Nansemond County in 1646. The county became the independent city of Nansemond in 1972, and in 1974, merged with the city of Suffolk. The new consolidated city assumed the name of Suffolk.

In 1691 Lower Norfolk County was in turn divided to form Norfolk County and Princess Anne County.

In 1963, after approval by referendum of the voters of the City of South Norfolk and the rest of Norfolk County and the Virginia General Assembly, were combined and reorganized as a new city, ending the threat of additional annexations. The new name selected by the voters was Chesapeake, and so, the new city of Chesapeake, Virginia was created.

Also in 1963, after approval by referendum of the voters of the City of Virginia Beach and the rest of Princess Anne County and the Virginia General Assembly, were consolidated as an independent city, assuming the better-known name of Virginia Beach.

== See also ==
- Upper Norfolk County, Virginia (1637-1646)
- Lower Norfolk County, Virginia (1637-1691)
- Nansemond County (1646-1972)
- Norfolk County, Virginia (1691-1963)
- Princess Anne County (1691-1963)
- South Norfolk, Virginia (1919-1963)
