= Second Virginia Charter =

1609 legal document

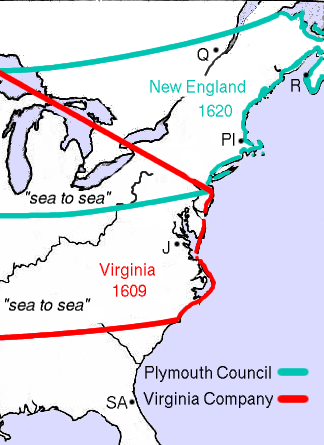
The land of the 1609 charter

The Second Virginia Charter, also known as the Charter of 1609 (dated May 23, 1609), is a document that provided "a further Enlargement and Explanation of the said [first] Grant, Privileges, and Liberties", which gave the London Company adventurers influence in determining the policies of the company, extended the Company's rights to land extending "up into the Land throughout from Sea to Sea", and allowed English merchant companies and individuals to invest in the colonization effort. The charter includes a detailed list of the names of some 650 noblemen, gentlemen, officials, companies, and individuals who subscribed as investors.

== Land granted ==
The company was granted 400 miles of coastline, 200 north from Cape Comfort and 200 south from it, as well as all the land stretching from this coastline to the Pacific and Arctic Ocean.

And we do also of our special Grace, certain Knowledge, and mere Motion, give, grant and confirm, unto the said Treasurer and Company, and their Successors, under the Reservations, Limitations, and. Declarations hereafter expressed, all those Lands, Countries, and Territories, situate, lying, and being in that Part of America, called Virginia, from the Point of Land, called Cape or Point Comfort, all along the Sea Coast to the Northward, two hundred miles, and from the said Point of Cape Comfort, all along the Sea Coast to the Southward, two hundred Miles, and all that Space and Circuit of Land, lying from the Sea Coast of the Precinct aforesaid, up into the Land throughout from Sea to Sea, West and Northwest; And also all the Islands lying within one hundred Miles along the Coast of both Seas of the Precinct aforesaid; Together with all the Soils, Grounds, Havens, and Ports, Mines, as well Royal Mines of Gold and Silver, as other Minerals, Pearls, and precious Stones, Quarries, Woods, Rivers, Waters, Fishings, Commodities, Jurisdictions, Royalties, Privileges, Franchises, and Preheminences within the said Territories, and the Precincts thereof, whatsoever, and thereto, and thereabouts both by Sea and Land, being, or in any sort belonging or appertaining, and which We, by our Letters Patents, may or can grant, in as ample Manner and Sort, as We, or any our noble Progenitors, have heretofore granted to any Company, Body Politic or Corporate, or to any Adventurer or Adventurers, Undertaker or Undertakers of any Discoveries, Plantations, or Traffic, of, in, or into any Foreign Parts whatsoever, and in as large and ample Manner, as if the same were herein particularly mentioned and expressed; To HAVE AND TO HOLD, possess and enjoy, all and singular the said Lands, Countries and Territories, with all and singular other the Premises heretofore by these Presents granted, or mentioned to be granted to them, the said Treasurer and Company, their Successors and Assigns forever To the sole and proper Use of them, the said Treasurer and Company, their Successors and Assigns forever; To BE HOLDEN of Us, our Heirs and Successors, as of our Manor of East-Greenwich, in free and common Soccage, and not in Capite; YIELDING and PAYING therefore, to Us, our Heirs and Successors, the fifth Part only of all Ore of Gold and Silver, that from Time to Time, and at all Times hereafter, shall be there gotten, had, or obtained, for all Manner of Services.

— The Second Charter of Virginia,

== See also ==
- First Virginia Charter
