= First Virginia Charter =

First Charter of the Colony of Virginia

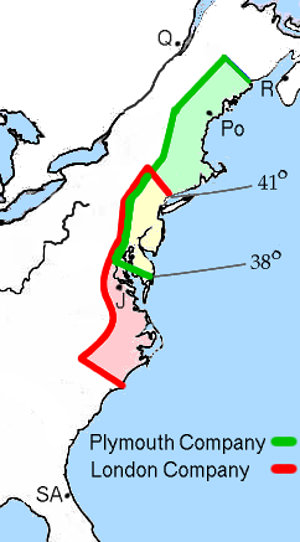
Map showing the grants provided for in the Charter of 1606

The First Charter of Virginia, also known as the Charter of 1606, is a document from King James I of England to the Virginia Company assigning land rights to colonists for the creation of a settlement which could be used as a base to export commodities to Great Britain and create a buffer preventing total Spanish control of the North and South American coasts. The land is described as coastal Virginia and the islands near to the coast, and stretches from present-day South Carolina to present-day Maine. The patch of land itself would remain the property of the King, with the London Company and the Plymouth Company (the two divisions of the Virginia Company) as the King's tenants, and the settlers as subtenants. The colony's government at first consisted of a council residing in London. The document designated the London Company as responsible for financing the project, which included recruiting settlers and also provided for their transport and supplies.

== Purpose of Charter ==
The charter favored the king's interests: The king did not invest, but was entitled to 20 percent of profit.

The charter also granted those born in the colonies all the rights of English subjects, and specifically for compensation and protection in case of robbery and spoliation.

The grant of the Charter was accompanied by the following words of the King:

We, greatly commending, and graciously accepting of, their Desires for the Furtherance of so noble a Work, which may, by the Providence of Almighty God, hereafter tend to the Glory of his Divine Majesty, in propagating of Christian Religion to such People, as yet live in Darkness and miserable Ignorance of the true Knowledge and Worship of God, and may in time bring the Infidels and Savages, living in those parts, to human Civility, and to a settled and quiet Government: DO, by these our Letters Patents, graciously accept of, and agree to, their humble and well-intended Desires.

== Management of charter ==
The King established a council and council member both in America and England to provide governance and management of the colonies and identified all council members. The council had the authority to enjoy the natural resources of the colonies with part of the profits given to the king. "That the said several Councils of and for the said several Colonies, shall and lawfully may, by Virtue hereof, from time to time, without any Interruption of Us, our Heirs or Successors, give and take Order, to dig, mine, and search for all Manner of Mines of Gold, Silver, and Copper, as well within any Part of their said several Colonies, as of the said main Lands on the Backside of the same Colonies; And to HAVE and enjoy the Gold, Silver, and Copper, to be gotten thereof, to the Use and Behoof of the same Colonies, and the Plantations thereof; YIELDING therefore to Us, our Heirs and Successors, the fifth Part only of all the same Gold and Silver, and the fifteenth Part of all the same Copper, so to be gotten or had, as is aforesaid, without any other Manner of Profit or Account, to be given or yielded to Us, our Heirs, or Successors, for or in Respect of the same" The charter also gave authority to council members, to perform regular governance activities as long as they conform to the King's approval. The king intended to give the colonists all benefits of a government including the right to have their own currency.

Although the colonists had a great deal of freedom, they were subject to the kings' approval. The following passage states the risk associated with trading without approval. "Moreover, our gracious Will and Pleasure is, and we do, by these Presents, for Us, our Heirs, and Successors, declare and set forth, that if any Person or Persons, which shall be of any of the said Colonies and Plantations, or any other, which shall trick to the said Colonies and Plantations, or any of them, shall, at any time or times hereafter, transport any Wares, Merchandises, or Commodities, out of any of our Dominions, with a Pretence to land, sell, or otherwise dispose of the same, within any the Limits and Precincts of any of the said Colonies and Plantations, and yet nevertheless, being at Sea, or after he hath landed the same within any of the said Colonies and Plantations, shall carry the same into any other Foreign Country, with a Purpose there to sell or dispose of the same, without the Licence of Us, our Heirs, and Successors, in that Behalf first had and obtained; That then, all the Goods and Chattels of such Person or Persons, so offending and transporting together with the said Ship or Vessel, wherein such Transportation was made, shall be forfeited to Us, our Heirs, and Successors."

The charter concluded with a final agreement of the king to authorize the stated colonists to practice their duties as outlined in the paragraphs above.

== See also ==
- Second Virginia Charter

== Notes ==
- “1584: The First English Voyage (U.S. National PARK SERVICE).” National Park Service, U.S. Department of the Interior, www.nps.gov/articles/1584voyage.htm.
- The First Charter of Virginia; April 10, 1606. Yale University Project "1996-2007 The Avalon Project at Yale Law School".
