= James City (Virginia Company) =

17th century Virginia Company settlement

Coordinates: 37°12′N 76°47′W

James City (or James Cittie as it was then called) was one of four incorporations established in the Virginia Colony in 1619 by the Virginia Company. The plantations and developments were divided into four "incorporations" or "citties" [sic], as they were called. These were Charles City, Elizabeth City, Henrico City, and James City. James City included the seat of government for the colony at Jamestown. Each of the four cities extended across the James River, the main conduit of transportation of the era.

In April 1623, the Privy Council appointed the proposal and commissioned a compromise. During the re-establishment, the Crown took over the company through a new charter similar to the one of 1606. The company refused this charter, causing the crown to issue a writ of quo warrant for annulment of the charter, ending the Virginia Company in May 1624. In 1634, under Royal authority, a portion became James City Shire, later the County of James City (aka James City County).

== Early events ==
In December 1609, a fleet commanded by Sir Thomas Gates set out from Plymouth, England, carrying 500 settlers, food, arms, and equipment to Jamestown, only to meet disaster. The ship hit a reef, causing damage and scattering the survivors. On May 16, 1610, they built James Fort, later renamed as Jamestown Colony. This became the first permanent English American settlement.

James City's survival was profoundly influential to America future as it allowed Virginia to emerge as the richest and most populous of the British mainland colonies with the first English language, law, institution, and Protestant Church. It blossomed into a vibrant political culture in Jamestown in 1619, even compared to other British colonies, which led in time to new republican ideals that found their fulfillment in the foundation of United States.

=== Starving Time ===
The Starving Time was an event that took place during years 1609–1610. It resulted from shortages of food, fractured leadership, and a siege by Powhatan Indian warriors. The colonists struggled to maintain enough food to sustain themselves, putting them in dire need. Relations were already strained with the Virginia Indian tribes, their most likely trading partners, and those relations worsened. The severe famine affected the entire region., leaving only 61 survivors by spring.

=== Early Indian conflict ===
Conflict between the colony and the Powhatan Indians lead to bloodshed, increasing the mortality rate that was already high due to disease and starvation. The Powhatans launched a mass attack on Jamestown. During the conflict, Pocahontas was kidnapped and made an uneasy truce with her father, Powhatan, which brought short peace between the tribe and settlers. However, after Pocahontas' death, new tensions began to rise between the colony and Indians. This conflict grew worse after Powhatan died shortly after Pocahontas death. Her father's death caused the downward spiral of Indian-English relations that led to the uprising of March 1622.

=== Massacre event ===
March 1622, the local tribes launched a major attack, massacring nearly 350 settlers by the time it was done. During the great massacre, the company went bankrupt, while Sandys's unpopularity prompted a royal investigation. This event combined with the subsequent high death rate in 1622–1623, caused it to lose its rule and ended the company.

== Trades ==
James City was a modest farm area with multiple small plantations containing 250 acres of land. The chief crop was tobacco, which remained the cornerstone of Virginia economy for 200 years. James City, itself, sold 60,000 pounds of tobacco to England by 1622. During the early 1620s, tobacco sold for approximately £200-£1,000 for single crops. After Bacon's Rebellion, the demand for more workers was required, so Jamestown brought over Africans from Africa to be sold for labor.
