= Charles City (Virginia Company) =

Subdivision of the Colony of Virginia

Charles City (or Charles Cittie as it was then called) was one of four incorporations established in the Virginia Colony in 1619 by the proprietor, the Virginia Company. In 1613, Bermuda City was founded, which was later renamed after Prince Charles. In 1634, under Royal authority, a portion became Charles City Shire, later Charles City County.

== History ==
Algonquian-speaking Native Americans migrated to the area from the north at least 800 years before the first Europeans arrived. It was home to the Chickahominy, Paspahegh and Weyanock tribes when the Susan Constant, the Godspeed and the Discovery entered the mouth of the Chesapeake Bay in 1607 and sailed up the James River. By the time of the English colonization of the area, the greatest power in the Virginia Tidewater region was the Powhatan confederacy of thirty tribes.

The plantations and developments were divided into four "incorporations" or "citties" (sic), as they were called. These were Charles City, Elizabeth City, Henrico City, and James City. The latter included the seat of government for the colony at Jamestown. Each of the four "citties [sic]" extended across the James River, the main conduit of transportation of the era.

In 1611 Kecoughtan (Elizabeth City) was established on a permanent basis and Henrico was laid out. In 1613 the fourth of the Company settlements was established as Bermuda City which was to become Charles City, named after Prince Charles. While some settlers farmed the land, others made pitch, tar, potash, and charcoal for the Company.
