= 1933 Chesapeake–Potomac hurricane =

Category 4 Atlantic hurricane in 1933

Hurricane Six 1933 Chesapeake–Potomac hurricane
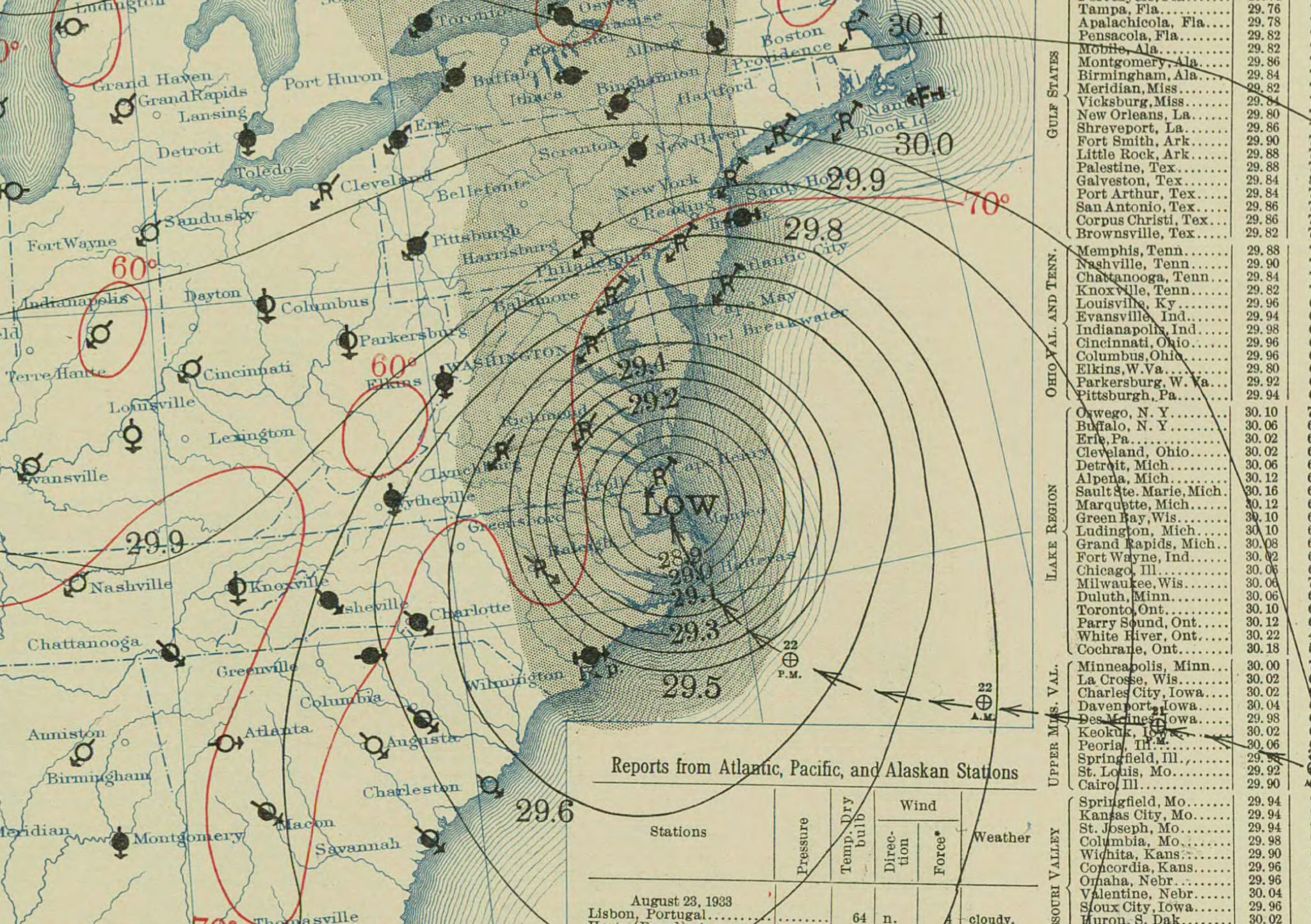
- Surface weather analysis of the hurricane shortly after landfall on August 23

Meteorological history
- Formed: August 13, 1933
- Extratropical: August 25, 1933
- Dissipated: August 28, 1933

Category 4 major hurricane
- 1-minute sustained (SSHWS/NWS)
- Highest winds: 140 mph (220 km/h)
- Lowest pressure: 940 mbar (hPa); 27.76 inHg

Overall effects
- Fatalities: 47 total
- Damage: $41.2 million (1933 USD)
- Areas affected: North Carolina, Virginia, Washington, D.C., Maryland, Delaware, Mid-Atlantic States, Northeastern United States, Atlantic Canada
- IBTrACS
- Part of the 1933 Atlantic hurricane season

The 1933 Chesapeake–Potomac hurricane was among the most damaging hurricanes in the Mid-Atlantic states in the eastern United States. The sixth storm and third hurricane of the very active 1933 Atlantic hurricane season, it formed in the eastern Atlantic, where it moved west-northwestward and eventually became a Category 4 on the Saffir-Simpson hurricane wind scale. (Note: The Saffir-Simpson hurricane wind scale was developed in 1971, and has been retroactively applied to the entirety of the Atlantic hurricane database.) A strong ridge over New England allowed a continued northwest course, bringing the storm south of Bermuda and later toward the middle coast of the eastern United States. Advanced warning allowed hundreds of people to evacuate ahead of the hurricane making landfall. It did so in northeastern North Carolina on August 23 with winds of about 90 mph (140 km/h). Soon after, the eye crossed over Norfolk, Virginia, the first time that happened since 1821. The hurricane weakened into a tropical storm over northern Virginia shortly before passing near Washington, D.C., becoming the worst tropical cyclone there since 1896. Curving northward, the storm moved through Pennsylvania and New York before losing tropical characteristics on August 25. Now extratropical, the former hurricane moved across Atlantic Canada, dissipating on August 28.

Across the eastern United States, the hurricane left widespread damage amounting to over $40 million (equivalent to about $956 million in 2024) and causing at least 47 deaths. Although the storm struck North Carolina, damage in the state totaled only about $250,000, (Note: All damage totals are in 1933 United States dollars unless otherwise stated.) largely to crops and transport. Along the Chesapeake Bay, the storm produced 100-year flooding from its storm surge, setting records that remained for 70 years. In Virginia, flooding covered downtown portions of Norfolk in the southeast and Alexandria in the north. Damage in the state was estimated at $17.5 million. Similarly heavy damage occurred in Maryland, including over $7 million to crops. High waves along the coast eroded beaches and created a new inlet at Ocean City. The highest rainfall associated with the hurricane was 13.28 in (337 mm) at York, Pennsylvania. In the state, the rains flooded several rivers which forced thousands to evacuate. In neighboring New Jersey, high waves wrecked boats and destroyed a fishing pier, while in New York, flooding caused traffic jams. In Atlantic Canada, heavy rainfall assisted firefighters in combating wildfires, and the associated winds caused isolated power outages.

== Meteorological history ==
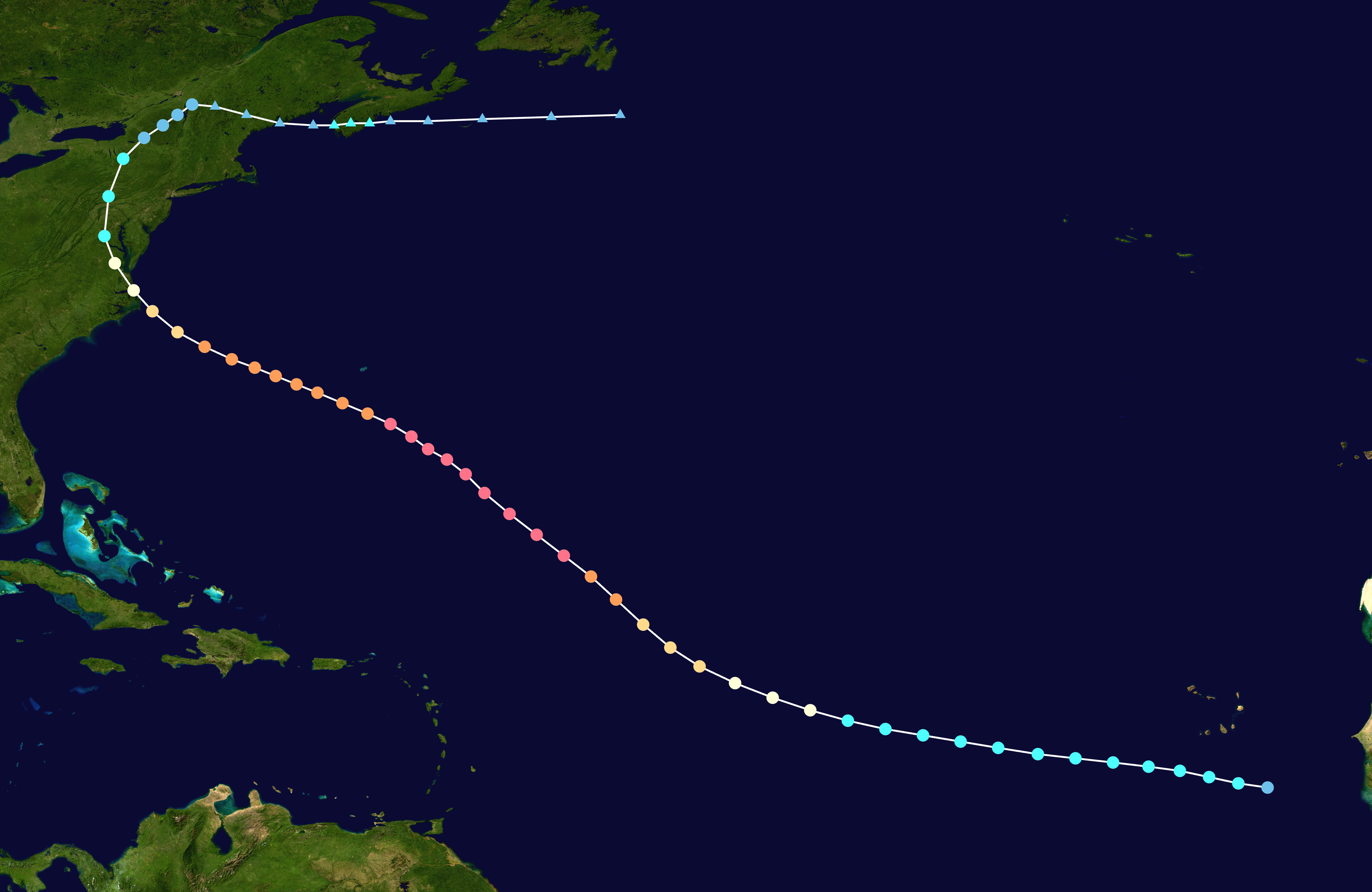
Map plotting the storm's track and intensity, according to the Saffir–Simpson scale Map key Saffir–Simpson scale Tropical depression (≤38 mph, ≤62 km/h) Tropical storm (39–73 mph, 63–118 km/h) Category 1 (74–95 mph, 119–153 km/h) Category 2 (96–110 mph, 154–177 km/h) Category 3 (111–129 mph, 178–208 km/h) Category 4 (130–156 mph, 209–251 km/h) Category 5 (≥157 mph, ≥252 km/h) Unknown Storm type Tropical cyclone Subtropical cyclone Extratropical cyclone, remnant low, tropical disturbance, or monsoon depression

On August 13, a tropical depression developed near the west coast of Africa, southeast of Cape Verde, with an associated closed circulation. Based on observations from a nearby ship, it is estimated the depression quickly intensified into a tropical storm while moving generally to the west-northwest. For several days the storm continued this general trajectory, eventually shifting more to the northwest. Based on interpolation of reports, it is estimated the storm intensified into a hurricane on August 16 while halfway between Africa and the Lesser Antilles. The Weather Bureau began tracking the system on August 18. Later that day, a ship reported a pressure of 948 mbar (28.0 inHg), suggesting winds of 135 mph (217 km/h). This made the hurricane a Category 4 on the Saffir-Simpson hurricane wind scale. Another ship report on August 20 indicated a pressure of 940 mbar (28 inHg) while reporting hurricane winds, suggesting peak winds of 140 mph (230 km/h).

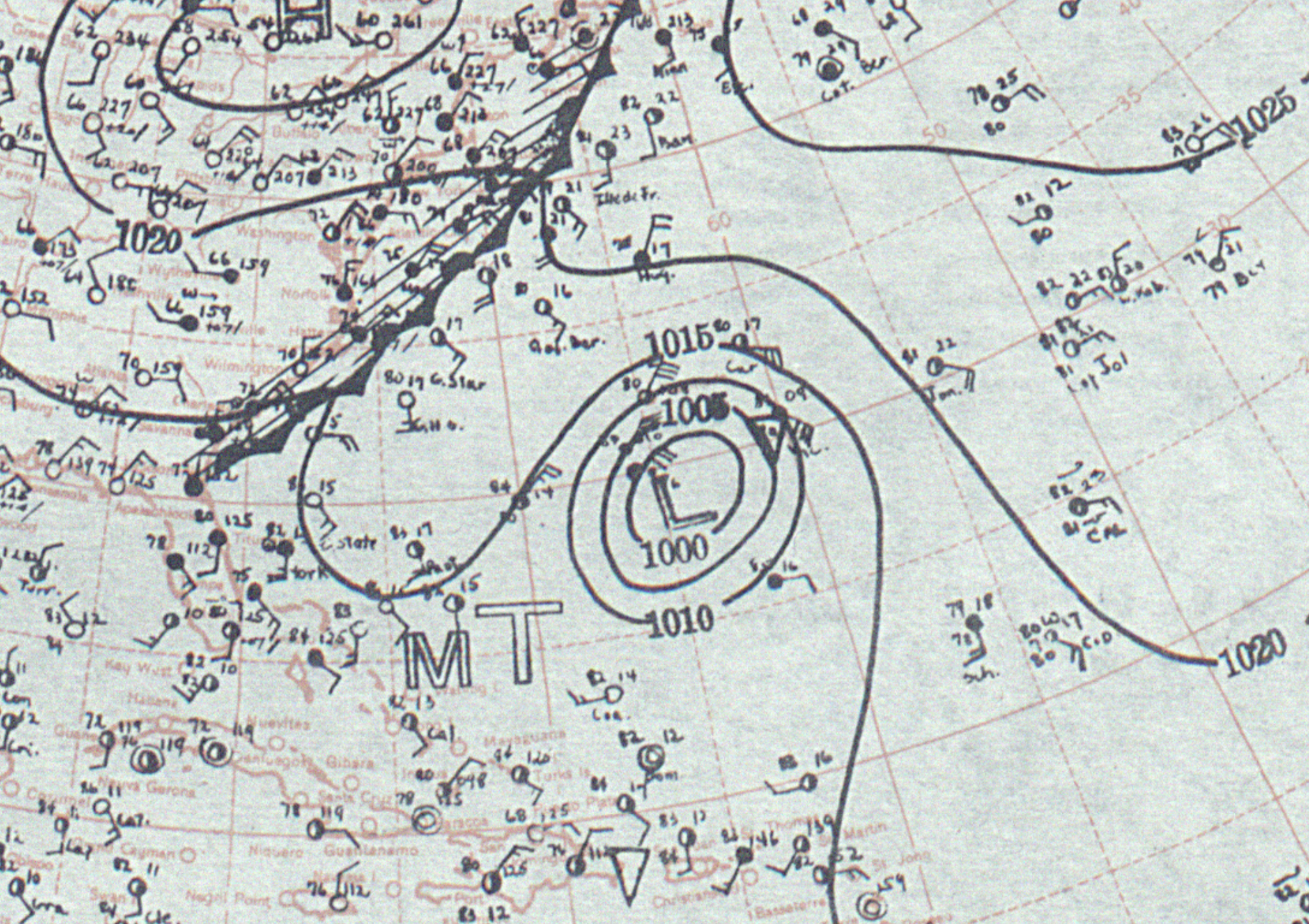
Weather map of the hurricane nearing peak intensity on August 20

After remaining near peak intensity for three days, the hurricane began steadily weakening while curving more to the west-northwest, a rare track for the region due to steering from a ridge over New England. On August 21, the storm passed about 150 mi (240 km) southwest of Bermuda. At 1000 UTC on August 23, the hurricane made landfall along the northern Outer Banks of North Carolina, near Nags Head, with a pressure of 963 mbar (28.4 inHg). Based on the steady weakening, coastal observations, and a larger than normal size, landfall winds were estimated at 90 mph (140 km/h). A few hours later, the hurricane made another landfall on the North Carolina mainland after crossing the Albemarle Sound. While the hurricane continued to the northwest, the eye briefly moved over Norfolk, Virginia, for the first time since the 1821 Norfolk and Long Island hurricane. Early on August 24, the hurricane weakened into a tropical storm while passing near Washington, D.C. Curving to the north, the storm crossed Pennsylvania and into New York, where it weakened further into a tropical depression. On August 25, the former hurricane turned to the east near the Canada–US border, and after interacting with a cold front, became extratropical. It emerged from Maine and briefly re-intensified, moving across southern Nova Scotia with gale-force winds. On August 28, the circulation dissipated to the south of Newfoundland.

== Preparations and impact ==
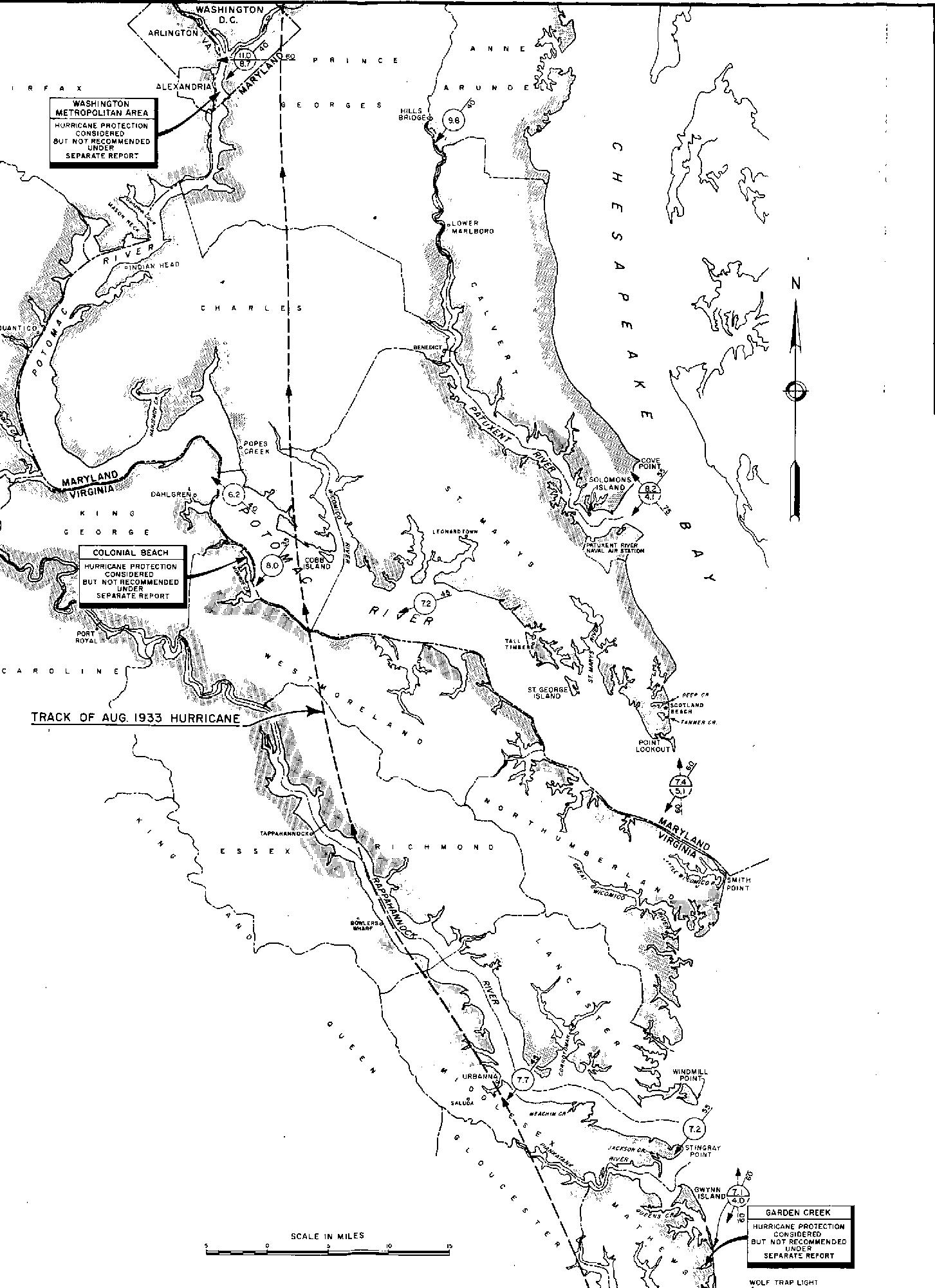
Track of the 1933 Hurricane across Virginia and Maryland

The hurricane first affected Bermuda when it passed to the south. Winds at St. George's reached 64 mph (103 km/h). High waves along the coast prevented boats from docking.

Early on August 21, the Weather Bureau issued storm warnings from Cape Hatteras to Boston, Massachusetts. As the hurricane approached land, the warnings were extended southward to Southport, North Carolina. In Norfolk, Virginia, most ships either remained at port or sought shelter due to advance warning. Residents were advised to evacuate in Ocean View, Virginia Beach, and Willoughby Spit, and about 350 people left their houses in Virginia Beach. Along the coast, the United States Coast Guard rescued more than 200 people, many of whom due to capsized boats. A 1993 article published in the Monthly Weather Review considered the storm to have been "one of the most severe storms that has ever visited the Middle Atlantic coast." Flooding affected a larger portion of the northeastern United States than any other hurricane in the 1900s after Hurricane Agnes in 1972. The Federal Emergency Management Agency later used high water levels from the storm as a 100-year event for the Chesapeake Bay region. The next storm to approach the storm surge levels was Isabel in 2003, which was lower in most locations in Virginia, although higher in Washington, D.C., and Baltimore due to sea level rise. This hurricane caused damage from North Carolina through New Jersey, due to the combination of high winds and storm tides, and left at least 47 people dead overall.

=== North Carolina and Virginia ===
When the hurricane made landfall in the Outer Banks, it produced winds of 76 mph (122 km/h) at Cape Hatteras. The winds caused crop damage as far inland as Granville County. The four-masted schooner G.A. Kohler hailing from Baltimore and bound for Haiti was driven ashore at Hatteras by the high winds. Across the region, the storm downed power lines, washed out highways, wrecked boats, and destroyed houses, and overall damage in the state was around $250,000.

As the hurricane moved into Virginia, winds were as strong as 82 mph (132 km/h) at Cape Henry, while Norfolk reported winds of 70 mph (110 km/h). The latter city reported a record high tide of 9.8 ft (3.0 m) above normal at Sewell's Point, which flooded the downtown section with 5 ft (1.5 m) of water. Water levels were 5 to 8 ft (1.5 to 2.4 m) higher than any previous high water mark in Newport News and most of Fort Eustis was flooded. In Hampton the storm surge flooded Langley Air Force Base, swamped homes and businesses, wrecked boats, and destroyed fishing piers. Rainfall in Chesapeake reached about 10 in (250 mm), and reached about 7 in (180 mm) in Norfolk. Flooding near Norfolk damaged crops, and after its downtown section was flooded, residents were forced to travel by boat. When the flood levels dropped, many fish were left behind in the streets. High water levels of around 4 ft (1.2 m) along the York River destroyed buildings at Gloucester Point. In Virginia Beach, the storm knocked down about 600 trees, many of them about 100 years old, and over 79,000 people lost telephone service.

Due to advance warning, there was minimal damage to shipping in the region. However, high waves damaged the steamer Madison with 90 people on board and caused it to drift off Cape Charles, which necessitated rescue from the Coast Guard. Inland flooding occurred along the James River as far west as Richmond, where damage was limited to downed trees and broken windows. The pier of the Jamestown Ferry was washed out in Surry and a marina at Jordan Point near Hopewell was wrecked after the river reached the highest level on record. A powerful storm surge moved up the Chesapeake Bay and flooded waterfront locations. At Colonial Beach along the Potomac River, the surge flooded the town with 4 ft (1.2 m) of water and wrecked a local amusement park. The Potomac in Alexandria was at its highest level since 1899, causing floods 8 ft (2.4 m) deep along U.S. Route 1, and flooding the Old Town section. High winds in the city caused power outages, and flooding along the Cameron Run washed out a bridge. The combination of rain and winds damaged crops in Fairfax and Loudoun counties, mainly to corn and peaches. Statewide, the storm caused $5.25 million in crop damage, largely to corn and tobacco. Damage in the state was estimated at $17.5 million, and there were 15 deaths. After the storm, about 350 people helped clear debris from the streets of Norfolk.

=== Maryland and the Mid-Atlantic ===
Farther north, it is estimated the storm produced hurricane-force winds in portions of Maryland. Along the coast, high waves eroded about 2 sq mi (5.2 km^{2}) of beaches in Maryland and another 1 sq mi (2.6 km^{2}) in Delaware. High waves created an inlet that turned Assateague into an island. The storm damaged or destroyed several hotels in the region. Power, telephone, and telegraph outages occurred from Cape Charles through Delaware. In Baltimore, 7.62 in (194 mm) of precipitation fell in 24 hours, setting a record and causing flooding. The storm surge wrecked a steamboat pier and promenade at Chesapeake Beach, and damaged or destroyed 70 houses in neighboring North Beach. In Cheverly, flooding caused nine cars of a train to derail, killing four people. Statewide, the storm caused about $7 million in crop damage, mostly to tobacco, tomato, and corn. The high tides caused $3 million in damage to the fishing industry, having damaged or destroyed many boats and docks. There was about $90,000 worth of damage to the United States Naval Academy in Annapolis, after docks were damaged. Throughout the state, the hurricane caused about $10 million in property damage, with another $1.1 million to federal properties, about $960,000 in transportation damage, and $364,000 in utility damage.

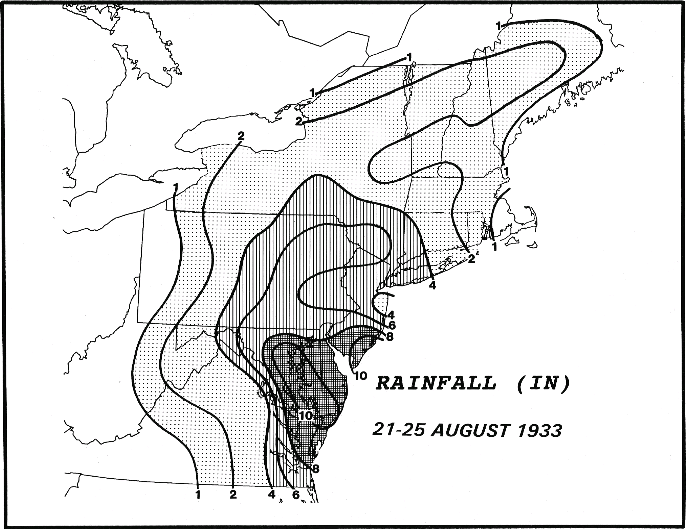
1933 hurricane rainfall across the Northeast

In neighboring Delaware, road damage was about $150,000, after three bridges were wrecked along DuPont Highway. Rainfall in the state reached 13.24 in (336 mm) in Bridgeville. In Washington, D.C., the storm dropped 6.39 in (162 mm) of rainfall, at the time the highest on record for a single day total. High winds knocked down trees and destroyed the roofs of several houses. Along the Anacostia River, flooding surpassed a seawall, and traffic was disrupted when the Benning Bridge was flooded with 2 ft (0.61 m) of water. The Washington-Hoover Airport was also flooded. Damage in the nation's capital was the worst since a tropical storm in 1896. The highest rainfall associated with the hurricane was 13.28 in (337 mm) near York, Pennsylvania. On August 24, the minimum pressure in Philadelphia dropped to 996 millibars (29.4 inHg), which was the lowest on record in the month of August at the time. Wind gusts in the city reached 42 mph (68 km/h). In the surrounding area, winds and rainfall caused $1 million in damage, mostly to crops and houses, and there were four deaths. Rainfall caused the worst flooding in the Lehigh Valley since 1902. In York County, floods destroyed 47 bridges, while in York proper, about 3,000 people evacuated along the swollen Codorus Creek.

Hurricane-force winds potentially affected portions of Delaware and southern New Jersey. In Atlantic City, New Jersey, winds reached 76 mph (122 km/h) at a height of 171 ft (52 m), which is 67 mph (108 km/h) at sea level. At the time, this was the highest wind report for the station in the month of August. Rainfall in Atlantic City totaled 8.12 in (206 mm), including 2.25 in (57 mm) that fell in an hour on August 20, which was the monthly average. Two people drowned along the Jersey Shore due to high waves, and the storm capsized nine boats. The waves destroyed a 300 ft (91 m) long fishing pier in Cape May. High winds damaged the boardwalk while streets were flooded in Atlantic City, and there was about $3 million in damage. The storm spawned a tornado in Wildwood. At Picatinny Arsenal, residents and members of the military helped prevent a dam from breaking. Sustained winds of around 35 mph (56 km/h) were observed across northern New York, while the top of the Empire State Building reported a gust of 90 mph (140 km/h). Heavy rainfall in the state increased water levels along streams, causing one person to drown at Mount Tremper. After a dam broke, 190 people at Godeffroy were stranded until they were rescued by a fire crew. A power outage during the storm caused the Statue of Liberty torch to extinguish for the first time since 1929. Streets and basements of New York City were flooded after the heavy rainfall. The combination of flooding and fallen trees caused heavy traffic jams.

The former hurricane passed near southern Quebec as a tropical depression, and later crossed southern Nova Scotia as an extratropical cyclone. Along Lake Ontario, winds reached 51 mph (82 km/h), and in Montreal, winds reached 21 mph (34 km/h). After a dry summer, the storm's accompanying rainfall was beneficial, reaching 4.4 inches (110 mm) in Fredericton, New Brunswick and 2 inches (51 mm) in Halifax, Nova Scotia. The rains helped farmers in Ontario and assisted firefighters in New Brunswick and Nova Scotia. In Montreal, 2.4 inches (61 mm) of rainfall flooded a tunnel. Gusty winds knocked down power lines in portions of Quebec, Nova Scotia, and Nova Scotia. Overall effects were minor, limited to some utility damage and delays for shipping.

== See also ==
- Hurricane Fran
- Hurricane Isabel
- Hurricane Florence
- List of Delaware hurricanes
- List of North Carolina hurricanes (1900–49)
- List of Virginia hurricanes
