= List of North Carolina hurricanes (1900–1949) =

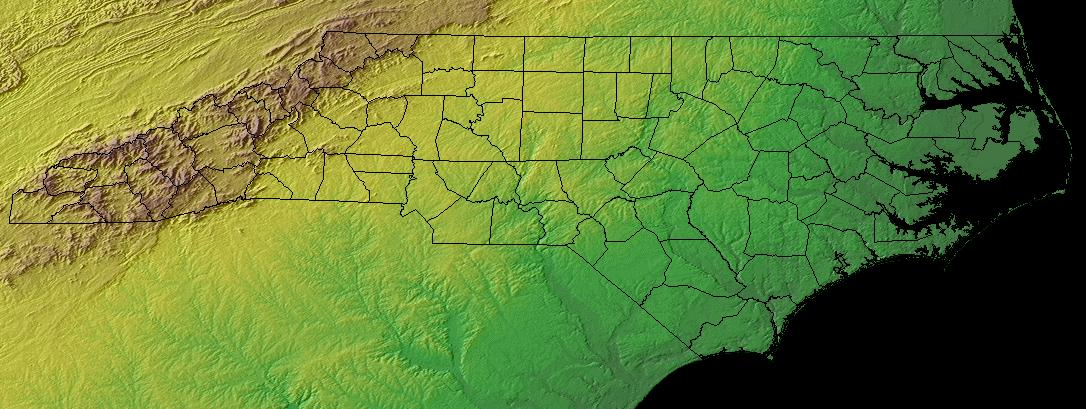
Topographic map of North Carolina

The list of North Carolina hurricanes between 1900 and 1949 encompasses 75 tropical cyclones or their remnants that affected the U.S. state of North Carolina. Collectively, cyclones in North Carolina during that time period resulted in 53 total fatalities, as well as about $328 million in damage in 2008 USD. Tropical cyclone affected the state in all but nine seasons. In the 1916 season, five storms affected the state, which makes it the season with the most storms impacting the state.

The strongest hurricanes to affect the state during the time period were the 1933 Outer Banks hurricane and the 1944 Great Atlantic Hurricane, which produced winds of Category 3 status on the Saffir–Simpson hurricane scale within the state. The 1933 Outer Banks hurricane was the deadliest hurricane in the state during the time period, which killed 21 people. The remnants of a hurricane in 1940 dropped heavy rainfall in the state, which caused over $150 million in damage (2008 USD) from flooding and landslides. Most storms affected the state in September, though in the first half of the 20th century, cyclones impacted the state between May and December.

== 1900s ==
- October 13, 1900 – The remnants of a tropical storm parallel the coastline.
- July 11, 1901 – A hurricane strikes the Outer Banks from the northeast, producing gusty winds but no serious damage.
- September 18, 1901 – A tropical storm brushes the coastline.
- June 16, 1902 – A tropical storm moves across the state.
- October 11, 1902 – The remnants of a tropical storm pass through the state.
- September 15, 1903 – A storm known as the Vagabond Hurricane passes just east of the Outer Banks, producing gusty winds but little damage.
- September 14, 1904 – After striking South Carolina, a hurricane causes heavy damage and one death while crossing the state.
- October 11, 1905 – The extratropical remnants of a tropical storm track along the Tennessee/North Carolina border.
- September 17, 1906 – Making landfall on South Carolina, a hurricane produces light damage near Wilmington.
- June 29, 1907 – A tropical storm parallels the coastline just inland.
- September 23, 1907 – The remnants of a tropical storm dissipate after crossing the state.
- May 29, 1908 – A hurricane passes just east of the Outer Banks, though its strongest winds remain offshore.
- July 31, 1908 – Heavy rainfall accompanies a hurricane moving across the state, which causes severe flooding near the coastline. Damage is locally heavy, but no casualties are reported.
- September 1, 1908 – A tropical storm moves across the Outer Banks, producing flooding and high tides.

== 1910s ==
- August 28, 1910 – A former tropical storm brings heavy rainfall to the coastline.
- October 20, 1910 – Unusual high tides accompany a tropical storm paralleling the coastline.
- August 6, 1911 – The first storm of the season brushes the coastline.
- August 31, 1911 – The remnants of a tropical storm dissipate in the state.
- June 14, 1912 – The extratropical remnants of a tropical storm pass through the state with gusty winds.
- September 4, 1912 – A tropical storm brushes the coastline while tracking southwestward just offshore.
- October 5, 1912 – An offshore hurricane drops 3.09 inches (78 mm) of rainfall in Cape Hatteras.
- September 3, 1913 – A hurricane makes landfall in the state, causing great damage to crops and property from winds and high tides. Several bridges are washed away, and for a time it is feared that the entire population of Ocracoke island is killed in the storm. The hurricane causes $3 million in damage (1913 USD, $65 million 2008 USD) and five deaths.
- October 11, 1913 – A former hurricane dissipates in the southern portion of the state.
- August 3, 1915 – A tropical depression crosses the state.
- September 15, 1915 – Moderate rainfall accompanies a tropical cyclone moving northward from the Gulf of Mexico through the Ohio Valley.
- May 16, 1916 – A tropical storm weakens while crossing the eastern portion of the state.
- July 10, 1916 – A former hurricane dissipates over Tennessee after dropping rainfall in western North Carolina.
- July 15, 1916 – The remnants of a tropical storm drop 22.22 inches (564 mm) of rainfall in a 24‑hour period in Highlands, which was the highest 24‑hour rainfall total in the entire United States. The rainfall causes landslides and flooding, which results in 11 fatalities.
- July 20, 1916 – An offshore hurricane produces gusty winds along the coastline.
- September 7, 1916 – A weak tropical storm dissipates after crossing the state.
- August 24, 1918 – A minimal hurricane crosses the eastern portion of the state, causing locally heavy damage.

== 1920s ==
- September 22, 1920 – A strong tropical storm moves ashore near Wilmington, which damages or destroys several buildings; one person is killed.
- October 23, 1923 – The extratropical remnants of a tropical storm bring severe gales to the Outer Banks as it moves inland.
- August 25, 1924 – A hurricane passes a short distance east of Hatteras, with its storm surge flooding portions of Ocracoke Island; two people drown during the storm.
- September 17, 1924 – The coastline is brushed by a tropical storm.
- September 30, 1924 – A former tropical storm crosses the eastern portion of the state.
- December 2, 1925 – The Outer Banks are struck by a post-season tropical storm, reporting gusty winds but little damage.
- August 24, 1927 – A hurricane brushes the Outer Banks.
- October 3, 1927 – A weakening tropical storm crosses through the state.
- August 13, 1928 – The remnants of a hurricane cause crop and structural damage from winds and heavy rainfall.
- August 17, 1928 – A second tropical cyclone produces further rainfall in the western portion of the state, which causes severe flooding that destroys several houses; property damage totals over $1 million (1928 USD, $12.6 million 2008 USD). Six people are killed in the state, of which four due to flooding.
- September 18, 1928 – The former Okeechobee Hurricane causes heavy rainfall and severe river flooding in the southeastern portion of the state. The flooding closes several roads and washes out a few bridges.
- October 29, 1929 – A former Florida hurricane produces heavy precipitation in the state, which causes severe flooding. The Cape Fear River rises 41 feet (12.5 m) in a 24‑hour period, and the storm results in damage to roads, crops, and businesses.

== 1930s ==
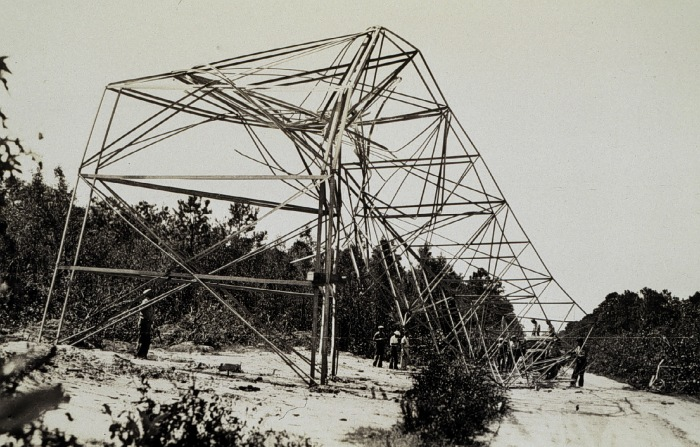
Damage from 1933 Outer Banks hurricane

- September 12, 1930 – The coastline receives minor damage from an offshore hurricane.
- September 16, 1932 – A tropical storm brushes the Outer Banks.
- October 16, 1932 – The remnants of a tropical storm bring moderate rainfall to the western portion of the state.
- August 23, 1933 – The Chesapeake Potomac Hurricane makes landfall along the northeastern portion of the state, causing locally heavy damage and high tides; damage is estimated at $250,000 (1933 USD, $4 million 2008 USD).
- September 15, 1933 – The Outer Banks hurricane produces heavy rainfall, strong winds, and high tides. Several homes are destroyed, leaving about 1,000 people homeless, and damage amounts to $4.5 million (1933 USD, $74.6 million 2008 USD). A total of 21 people are killed in the state.
- May 29, 1934 – A tropical storm moves ashore along South Carolina, and produces light wind damage in the Piedmont Triad area.
- July 21, 1934 – A developing tropical cyclone brushes the coastline while tracking southwestward.
- September 8, 1934 – The Outer Banks are affected by a hurricane transitioning into an extratropical cyclone, with heavy rainfall and gusty winds reported.
- September 6, 1935 – The remnants of the Great Labor Day Hurricane cross through the state with little impact.
- September 18, 1936 – Hatteras is struck by a hurricane, where it is described as one of the most severe on record. Strong winds destroy crops near the coastline, while high tides result in beach erosion; no deaths are reported.
- July 31, 1937 – A tropical storm brushes the coastline.
- August 6, 1937 – A tropical storm passes east of the Outer Banks.
- September 21, 1938 – The New England Hurricane of 1938 passes a short distance east of the Outer Banks, causing heavy rainfall and gusty winds.
- October 24, 1938 – A former tropical storm crosses the eastern portion of the state.
- August 18, 1939 – A tornado spawned by a weakening tropical depression kills a person in the state.

== 1940s ==
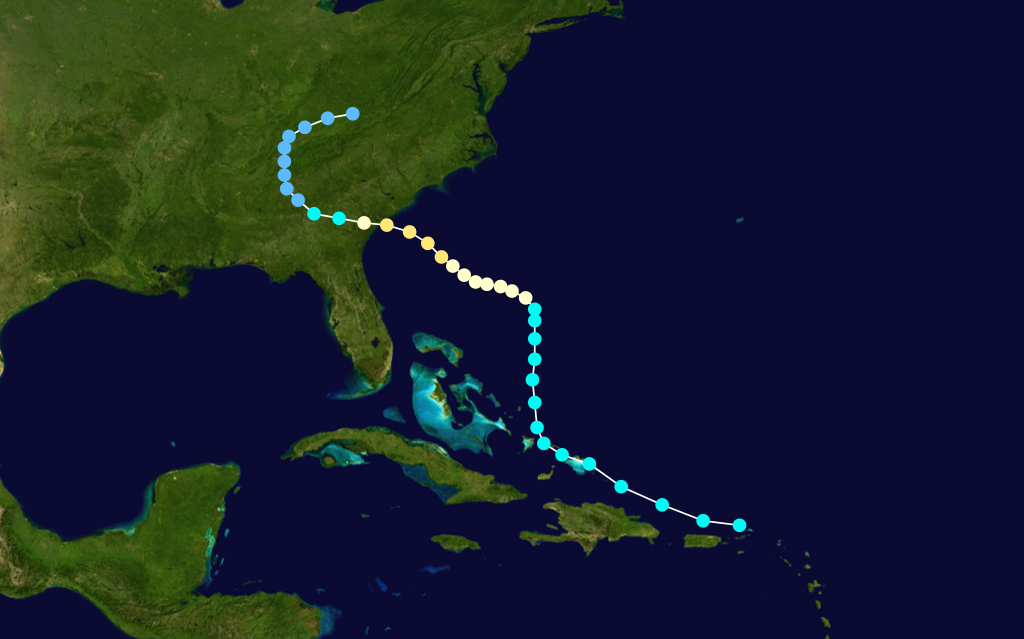
Track map of the storm of 1940

- August 15, 1940 – The extratropical remnants of a former hurricane dissipate in the state, dropping heavy rainfall which peaks at 19.6 inches (498 mm) in Swansboro. The precipitation causes severe river flooding, as well as flash flooding and mudslides, and thousands are left homeless. Over 20 people are killed, many due to mudslides, and damage amounted to over $10 million (1940 USD, $154 million 2008 USD).
- September 1, 1940 – A hurricane brushes the Outer Banks.
- September 23, 1941 – A tropical storm brushes the Outer Banks with light winds and rainfall.
- October 12, 1942 – Heavy rainfall is reported in association with a weak tropical storm hitting the state.
- August 1, 1944 – A hurricane moves ashore south of Wilmington, causing heavy damage in a small area along its path. Damage amounts to $2 million (1944 USD), primarily through crop damage, and no casualties are reported.
- September 14, 1944 – The Great Atlantic Hurricane passes just east of the Outer Banks, setting records, at the time, for strongest winds and the lowest pressure at Hatteras. The storm destroys 108 buildings and damages 667 more along the coast, resulting in $1.45 million in damage (1944 USD, $17.8 million 2008 USD). One person is killed in the state.
- October 20, 1944 – A former hurricane crosses the eastern portion of the state, causing power outages and coastal flooding.
- June 26, 1945 – Gusty winds and heavy rainfall accompany a tropical storm moving across the Outer Banks, which disrupts coastal communications and forces evacuations in two cities.
- September 17, 1945 – Torrential precipitation from a tropical storm crossing the state causes major river flooding across eastern North Carolina. A few dams break in the flooding, and there are reports of localized heavy damage.
- July 6, 1946 – A tropical storm crosses the eastern portion of the state, bringing heavy rainfall but little damage to the immediate coastline.
- October 9, 1946 – A former hurricane becomes extratropical over the state, dropping heavy rains along its path.
- August 24, 1947 – The extratropical remnants of a tropical storm cross the state.
- October 15, 1947 – A hurricane striking near Savannah, Georgia produces flooding and locally heavy rainfall in southeastern North Carolina.
- August 31, 1948 – High tides are reported in association with an offshore hurricane.
- November 11, 1948 – A late season hurricane becomes extratropical a short distance offshore the Outer Banks, causing high winds and waves.
- August 24, 1949 – A cyclone brushes the Outer Banks with moderate rainfall and hurricane-force winds, which results in two deaths.
- August 28, 1949 – Crossing the western portion of the state, a tropical storm brings several tornadoes and heavy rainfall, which causes severe river flooding.

== Monthly statistics ==
Number of recorded storms affecting North Carolina
Month	Number of storms
May	3
June	4
July	8
August	18
September	25
October	15
November	1
December	1

== Deadly storms ==
The table lists hurricanes by death tolls.

Name	Year	Number of deaths
Outer Banks Hurricane	1933	21 direct
Unnamed	1916	11 direct
Unnamed	1928	6 direct
Unnamed	1913	5 direct
Unnamed	1924	2 direct
Georgia-South Carolina Hurricane	1940	2 direct
Unnamed	1949	2 direct
Unnamed	1904	1 direct
Unnamed	1920	1 direct
Unnamed	1939	1 direct
Great Atlantic Hurricane	1944	1 direct

== See also ==
- List of North Carolina hurricanes
- Geography of North Carolina
