= Willoughby Spit =

Landform in Virginia

Coordinates: 36°58′1.2″N 76°16′56.9″W

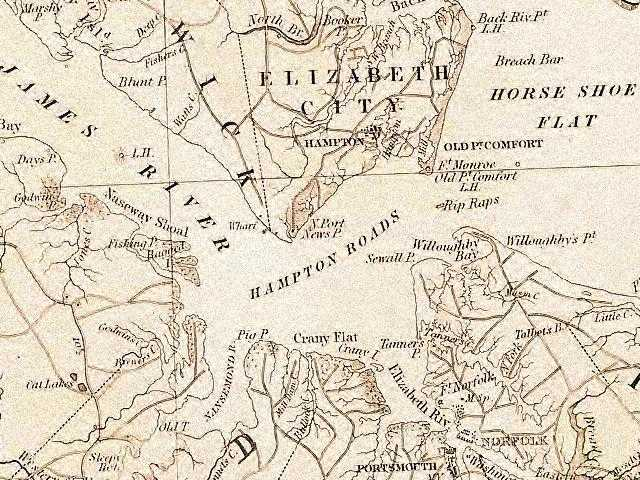
Hampton Roads, Virginia 1858.

Willoughby Spit is a peninsula of land in the independent city of Norfolk, Virginia in the United States. It is bordered by water on three sides: the Chesapeake Bay to the north, the James River to the west, and Willoughby Bay to the south.

== History ==
The area known as Willoughby Spit takes its name from Thomas Willoughby, who came to Virginia in 1610 and received his first of many land grants in 1625. Willoughby's son, Thomas II, was living there in the 1660s, and legend has it that his wife awoke one morning following a terrific storm (possibly the "Harry Cane" of 1667) to see a point of land in front her home, where there had been only water the night before. The Willoughby family, it is said, were quick to apply for an addendum to the original land grant, giving them ownership of the "new" property.

Severe storms and hurricanes would continue to transform the contour of the coast, and the Willoughby holdings, for more than a century. Although official records of Hampton Roads weather go back only to 1871 when the National Weather Service was established in downtown Norfolk, records of earlier storms have been located in ships' logs, newspaper accounts, history books and writings of early settlers.

Residents of colonial coastal Virginia were very much aware of the weather. To people who lived near the water and derived much of their livelihood from the sea, a tropical storm was a noteworthy event. During a hurricane in 1749, the Chesapeake Bay rose 15 feet (4.6 m) above normal, and a sand spit was washed up at Sewell's Point. With the help of the Great Coastal Hurricane of 1806, Willoughby Spit was formed.

Over the course of the next centuries, general westward movement of sand was compounded by extensive erosion of the 7.3-mile (11.7 km) long beach of Willoughby Spit and the rest of Ocean View. Homes and businesses built too close to the water were routinely threatened by coastal storms, and recreational use was limited because of the narrow width of the beach. The City of Norfolk began implementing a "beach nourishment" construction project, which included the installation of breakwaters to try to reduce beach erosion and protect the shoreline. Since then, the coastline has been improved to provide more beach for recreation, and a buffer from the power of a storm-driven oceans and hurricanes.

The breakwaters are by no means a permanent fix and create problems of their own, influencing the movement of sand. The beaches and coastal areas are by nature unstable. After Hurricane Isabel pounded on the coast of Norfolk in late 2003, Norfolk had to replenish the shore with 428,000 cubic yards (327,000 m^{3}) of sand, costing the city around $3.8 million. Despite the costs of maintaining the coastline, renewed growth around the area and increased tourism have generated revenue that the region depends upon.

The area of water now located between Sewell's Point and Willoughby Spit is known as Willoughby Bay.

== Ferries, bridge-tunnel ==
A ferry service operated between Willoughby Spit and Old Point Comfort across the mouth of Hampton Roads until 1958. In that year, the first portion of the new Hampton Roads Bridge-Tunnel was completed.

Today, the southern terminus of the Hampton Roads Bridge-Tunnel, which was expanded to four lanes in the 1970s, is located at the tip of Willoughby Spit. After leaving the bridge-tunnel, Interstate 64, part of the Hampton Roads Beltway, crosses a small portion of the spit and enters a bridge across the northern edge of Willoughby Bay.

== Shire to county to city ==
The entire area of South Hampton Roads was part of Elizabeth City Shire when it was formed in 1634. From this original shire (or county), in 1636 New Norfolk County was formed, soon divided into Upper and Lower Norfolk counties. Lower Norfolk County was split in 1691 to form Princess Anne County and Norfolk County.

The Willoughby Spit area was to remain part of Norfolk County for over 225 years. In 1923 it and the rest of Ocean View area were annexed by the independent City of Norfolk. (Virginia has had independent city political subdivisions since 1871).

== Aircraft flight makes history ==
In 1910, Eugene Ely made aviation history when he successfully launched his Curtiss biplane from the modified deck of the cruiser U.S.S. Birmingham and landed on the beach at Ocean View's Willoughby Spit, becoming the first pilot to take off from a ship.

== See also ==
- Sewell's Point
- Ocean View, Virginia
- Norfolk, Virginia
- Norfolk County, Virginia
