= Ocean View, Virginia =

Coastal region in Norfolk, Virginia

Coordinates: 36°57′00″N 76°14′47″W

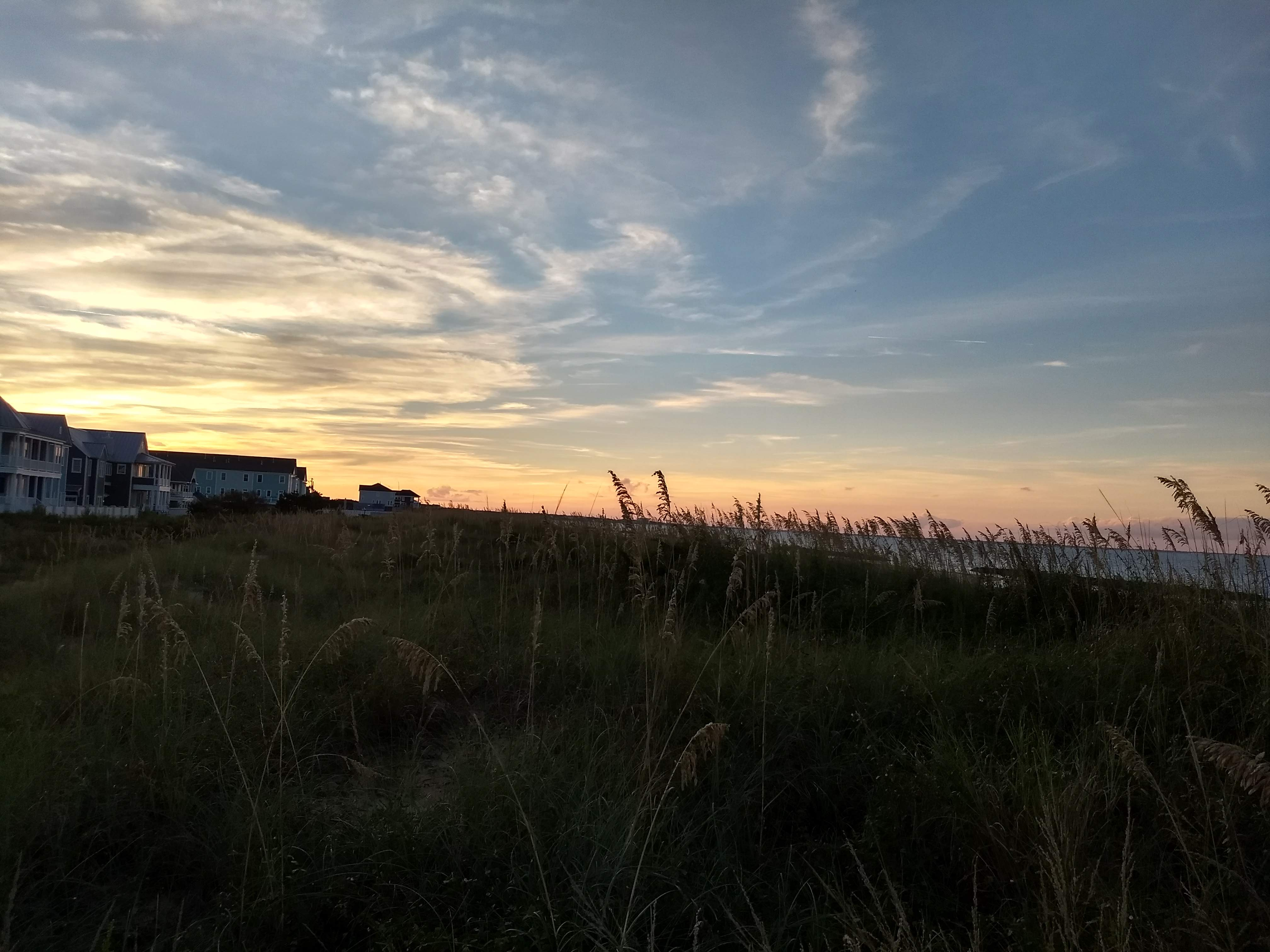
East Beach in Ocean View, along the Chesapeake Bay

Ocean View is a bayfront beach region in the independent city of Norfolk, Virginia in the United States. It has several miles of shoreline on the southern end of the Chesapeake Bay, starting at the Willoughby Spit to the west and ending at the Little Creek channel in the East Beach neighborhood to the east, just before reaching the Joint Expeditionary Base–Little Creek in the independent city of Virginia Beach.

== Shire to County to City ==
The entire area of South Hampton Roads was part of Elizabeth River Shire when it was formed in 1634. From this original shire (or county), in 1636, New Norfolk County was formed, which was divided again into Upper and Lower Norfolk counties in 1637. Lower Norfolk County was split in 1691 to form Princess Anne County and Norfolk County.

The Ocean View area was to remain part of Norfolk County for over 225 years, until it and the adjacent Willoughby Spit area were annexed by the independent City of Norfolk in 1923. (Virginia has had independent city political subdivisions since 1871). A small portion of East Ocean View adjacent to the Little Creek Amphibious Base was added in a land-swap with the city of Virginia Beach in 1988.

== Ocean View City: Trolleys, Famous Amusement Park ==
The area which became known as Ocean View City was originally a 360-acre (1.5 km^{2}) tract called the Magagnos Plantation which had extensive frontage on the Chesapeake Bay east of Willoughby Spit and west of Little Creek.

The Ocean View area was surveyed and laid out with streets and lots as Ocean View City in 1854 by William Mahone, a young civil engineer who was building the Norfolk and Petersburg Railroad. Under the leadership of Walter H. Taylor, about 30 years later, a narrow gauge steam passenger railroad service was established between Norfolk and Ocean View, a 9-mile long line crossing what was then known as Tanner's Creek (later renamed Lafayette River). Originally named the Ocean View Railroad, it was later known as the Norfolk and Ocean View Railroad. A small steam locomotive named the General William B. Mahone hauled ever increasing volumes of passengers, primarily on the weekends. The steam service was later replaced by electric-powered trolley cars, becoming both a popular resort and a streetcar suburb of the City of Norfolk. Initially, the improvements consisted of the swimming beach and cottages. The location was quite popular for Sunday outings from Norfolk.

The popular Nansemond Hotel was built about 1928; it was destroyed in a fire in 1980.

With the advent of additional electric streetcars in the late 19th century, an amusement park was developed at the end-of-the-line and a boardwalk was built along the adjacent beach area. These were a favorite of sailors on leave from the Norfolk Navy Base. Buses replaced the streetcars in the late 1940s. In the mid 20th century, for a number of years, AM radio station WGH broadcast live from a booth under the roller coaster.

Completion of the Hampton Roads Bridge-Tunnel in 1957 connected the Ocean View area to the Virginia Peninsula. However, it and other newer highways encouraged visitors to continue on to the Virginia Beach resort area on the Atlantic Ocean, a small city which boomed after merging with Princess Anne County in 1963. In particular, construction of nearby Interstate 64 and the Virginia Beach Expressway (now part of Interstate 264) made it easier for tourists from afar to bypass Ocean View en route to the Oceanfront area of Virginia Beach.

== Decline, Reemergence ==
After several years of decline in the 1970s, during which Busch Gardens in Williamsburg opened less than an hour's drive away, Ocean View Amusement Park was closed after Labor Day, 1978 and was torn down soon after the filming of a 1979 made-for-TV movie called The Death of Ocean View Park, which starred Mike Connors of Mannix fame, Barry Newman, and Academy Award winner Martin Landau. A key scene featured blowing up the landmark wooden roller coaster "The Rocket". While there had been popular concern as to the structural integrity of the famous but aged wooden structure, early attempts to film its destruction with explosives met with failure. Finally, on the third attempt, and with a bulldozer off camera helping to pull the structure down, the landmark appeared to explode in a large fireball. Also, the 1977 movie Rollercoaster (with Timothy Bottoms), George Segal, Henry Fonda, and Richard Widmark, features "The Rocket", as well as other shots of the park in the opening sequences.

In the early 21st century, as the entire coastal property market surged with new growth, redevelopment in the Ocean View community has resulted in new upscale residential properties replacing old beach cottages and small motels along the resort strip. Property values, especially bay front property, particularly in the East Beach neighborhood, have increased significantly in value.

Today, U.S. Route 60 is the main roadway paralleling the bay along the resort strip on Ocean View Avenue. U.S. Route 460 begins at its junction in front of the site of the former amusement park, where a city park and a high rise condominium is now located.

== East Beach ==
In a large-scale urban renewal project begun in the 1990s, the city of Norfolk invested over $50 million to develop, as part of a public-private partnership, an upscale new urbanist waterfront neighborhood named "East Beach" in East Ocean View. As part of the project, the city acquired and tore down more than 1,600 buildings across 100 acres, and relocated hundreds of low-income residents. The master plan for the neighborhood was designed by Andrés Duany with Duany Plater-Zyberk. The neighborhood is fashioned after classic Southeastern seaboard coastal villages, and includes 700 residences, neighborhood restaurants, boutique shops, a Bay Front Club, offices, parks and public places.

In 2003, a massive beach restoration project was completed by the city, the U.S. Army Corps of Engineers, and the Virginia Port Authority, which involved a large-scale rebuilding of sand dunes, planting of vegetation, and the placement of 10 offshore breakwaters to slow erosion and protect the neighborhood from coastal storms. In 2007, the American Shore and Beach Preservation Association named East Beach one of the nation's top seven restored beaches.

== Ocean View Fishing Pier ==
Not only was the Amusement Park well known to the region, so was Harrison's Fishing Pier. Owned by Bill Harrison and managed by Charlie Woodard. It was heavily damaged during Hurricane Isabel in September, 2003. A new pier was built, called the Ocean View Fishing Pier. Now owned by Ronnie Boone Jr., it continues to be an Ocean View landmark and attraction. This fishing pier is 1,690 feet long and considered the longest fishing pier in North America.

== See also ==
- Sewell's Point
- Willoughby Spit
- City of Norfolk
- Norfolk County
- Ocean View Elementary School
- Northside Middle School
