= Sewell's Point =

Landform in Norfolk, Virginia, U.S.

- Cape
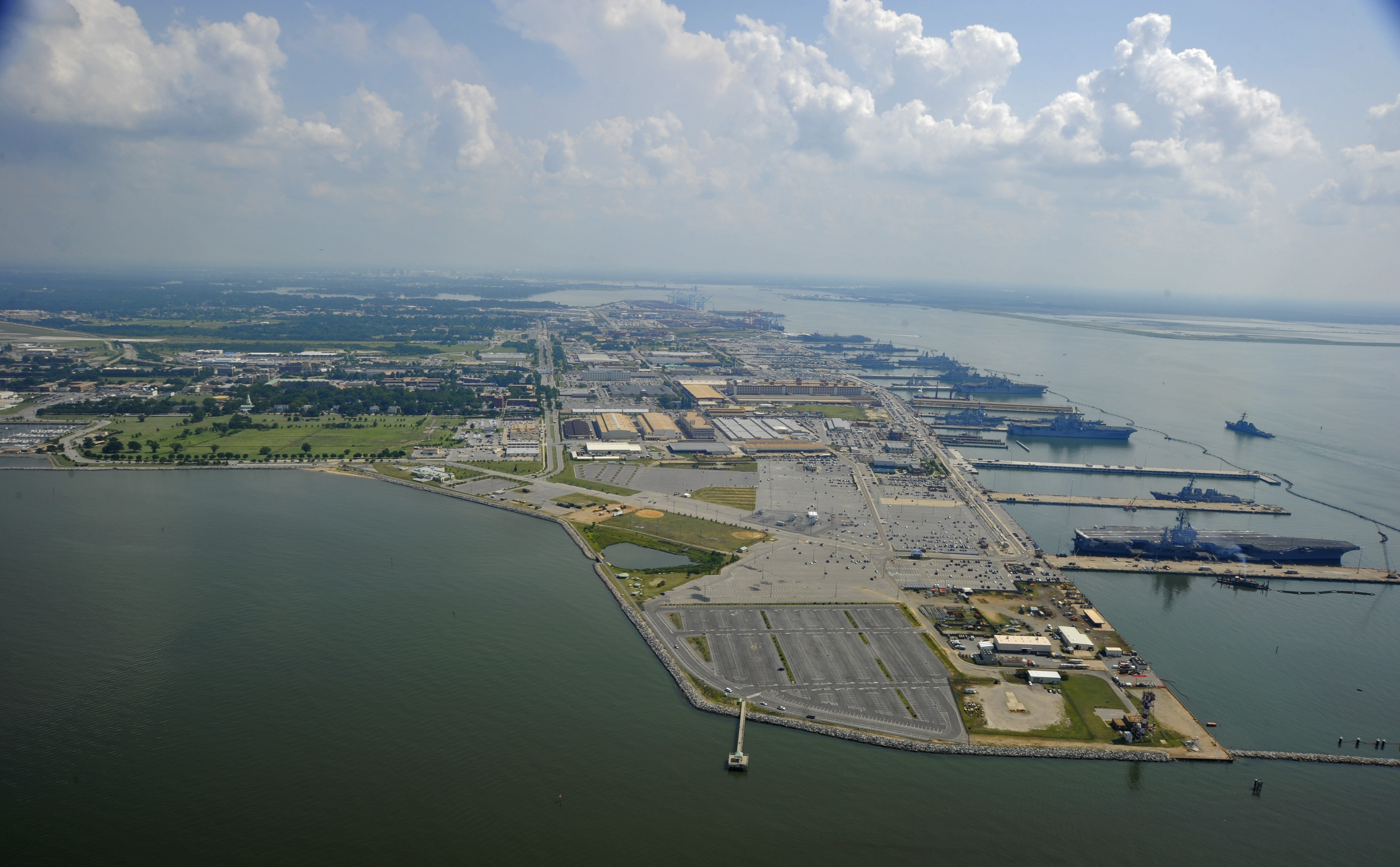
- Sewell's Point viewed from the north, 2011

- Location within Virginia
- Coordinates: 36°57′18″N 76°19′37″W
- Location: Virginia, United States
- Water bodies: Hampton Roads; Willoughby Bay; Lafayette River
- Elevation: 7 ft (2.1 m)

Sewells Point is a peninsula of land in the independent city of Norfolk, Virginia in the United States, located at the mouth of the salt-water port of Hampton Roads. Sewells Point is bordered by water on three sides, with Willoughby Bay to the north, Hampton Roads to the west, and the Lafayette River to the south. It is the site of Naval Station Norfolk.

== Origins and variations of name ==
The area was originally named in the 17th century after Henry Sewell, an Englishman who arrived in Virginia sometime prior to 1632.

Later, variations in spelling were used, such as Sowells Point, Seawells Point, and Sewalls Point. The common spelling today is Sewells Point.

== First church in Norfolk ==
About 1637, the Elizabeth River Parish was created. The first Anglican church of Elizabeth River Parish was erected between 1638 and 1640 "at Mr. Seawell's Pointe," with assistance of Thomas Willoughby. The first recorded minister was the Reverend John Wilson. The second church to be located in the area now known as South Hampton Roads (the first being St Lukes in Smithfield), it stood somewhere within the present western limits of the US Naval Station Norfolk. According to old court records, the Episcopal churches in Norfolk are directly descended from it.

== Local government – Shire to County to City – A Virginia tradition ==
Sewells Point is an area of land, most notable because of its prominence along the eastern shore of the harbor of Hampton Roads. Never declared a town or city, Sewells Point is more correctly described as a geographical area. The listing of political entities which have constituted the local government at Sewells Point is complex, but typical of many communities in the state of Virginia dating back to the colonial period.

During the 17th century, shortly after establishment of Jamestown in 1607, English settlers and explorers began settling the areas adjacent to Hampton Roads. By 1634, the English colony of Virginia consisted of eight shires or counties with a total population of approximately 5,000 inhabitants. Sewells Point was a part of Elizabeth River Shire.

In 1636, the southern portion of Elizabeth River Shire became New Norfolk County, and was divided in 1637 into Upper and Lower Norfolk Counties. In 1691 Lower Norfolk County was in turn divided to form Norfolk County and Princess Anne County.

Sewells Point was to remain located in Norfolk County for over 225 years, until the independent City of Norfolk annexed the area in 1923. (Virginia has had an independent city political subdivision since 1871). The City of South Norfolk and Norfolk County merged to form the new independent city of Chesapeake in 1963.

== Boundaries determined by weather ==
Although Hampton Roads represents a sheltered area from the tempests of both the Chesapeake Bay and the Atlantic Ocean, the area's shorelines change with extreme weather. At one time, apparently since English settlement began at Jamestown in 1607, Willoughby Bay did not border Sewells Point to the north, since it didn't even exist yet.

The area known as Willoughby takes its name from Thomas Willoughby, who came to Virginia in 1610 and received a land grant around 1625. Willoughby's son, Thomas II, was living there in the 1660s. According to local legend, his wife awoke one morning following a terrific storm (possibly the "Harry Cane" of 1667) to see a point of land in front her home, where there had been only water the night before. The Willoughby family, it is said, were quick to apply for an addendum to the original land grant, giving them ownership of the "new" property.

Severe storms and hurricanes would continue to transform the contour of the coast, and the Willoughby holdings, for more than a century. Although official records of Hampton Roads weather go back only to 1871 when the National Weather Service office was established in downtown Norfolk, records of earlier storms have been located in ships' logs, newspaper accounts, history books and writings of early settlers.

Residents of coastal Virginia in the colonial period (1607–1776) were very much aware of the weather. To people who lived near the water and derived much of their livelihood from the sea, a tropical storm was a noteworthy event. During a hurricane in 1749, the Chesapeake Bay rose 15 feet (4.6 m) above normal, sand spit was washed up at Sewells Point. With the help of the Great Coastal Hurricane of 1806, Willoughby Spit was formed. The area of water now located between Sewells Point and Willoughby Spit became known as Willoughby Bay.

== A strategic Civil War location ==
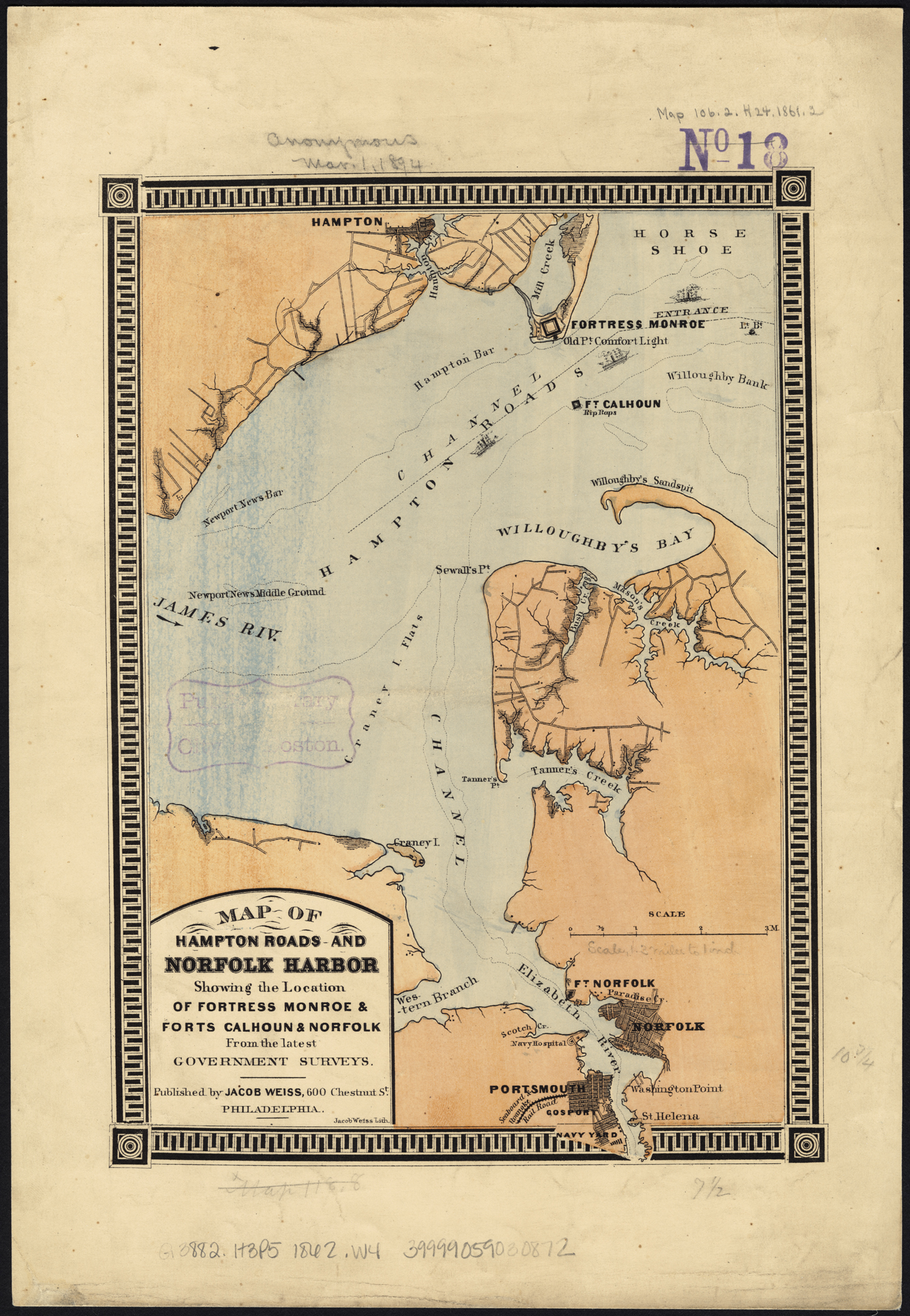
1861 map of Hampton Roads, Virginia

Sewells Point's location at the mouth of Hampton Roads proved to be a strategic location during the early portion of the Civil War.

=== Battle of Sewells Point ===
The first skirmish in Virginia, the little-known Battle of Sewells Point, was fought on May 18–19, 1861, on ground now occupied by the US Naval Station Norfolk. The events leading up to the initial engagement on Virginia soil had moved with whirlwind rapidity.

==== Events leading onto the Battle ====
On December 20, 1860, South Carolina became the first state to secede from the Union. Four months later, on April 12, 1861, troops of that state opened fire on Fort Sumter in Charleston's harbor. Five days later, Virginia became the eighth Southern state to withdraw from the Union, and join the newly formed Confederacy.

A few weeks later that spring, US General-in-Chief Winfield Scott proposed to President Lincoln a plan to bring the states back into the Union: cut the Confederacy off from the rest of the world instead of attacking its army in Virginia.

His plan was to blockade the Confederacy's coastline and control the Mississippi River valley with gunboats. Lincoln ordered a blockade of the southern seaboard from the South Carolina line to the Rio Grande on April 19 and on April 27 extended it to include the North Carolina and Virginia coasts. On April 20, the Union Navy burned and evacuated the Norfolk Navy Yard, destroying nine ships in the process, leaving only Fort Monroe at Old Point Comfort as the last bastion of the United States in Tidewater Virginia.

Occupation of Norfolk gave the Confederacy its only major shipyard and thousands of heavy guns, but they held it for only one year. CS Brigadier General Walter Gwynn, who commanded the Confederate defenses around Norfolk, erected batteries at Sewells Point, both to protect Norfolk and to control Hampton Roads.

The Union dispatched a fleet to Hampton Roads to enforce the blockade, and on May 18–19 Federal gunboats exchanged fire with the batteries at Sewells Point, resulting in little damage to either side.

==== The Battle Itself ====
Stewart's "History of Norfolk County, Virginia" (1902), contains a detailed account of the Battle of Sewells Point that took place one month later.

On May 18, 1861, Norfolk-area and Georgia Confederate troops began erecting land batteries at Sewells Point opposite Fort Monroe on Hampton Roads. By 5 o'clock that evening, three guns and two rifled guns had been mounted and work was rapidly progressing on the fortifications when the USS Monticello, commanded by Captain Henry Eagle, steamed over from Fort Monroe to see what was afoot. Not liking what he saw, Captain Eagle gave the order to open fire. One of the shots from his vessel hit the battery, throwing turf high in the air. In the meantime, the Monticello had been joined by an armed tug, also from Fort Monroe. The bombardment from these two vessels caused momentary confusion in the breastworks, but once the Confederates had recovered from the initial shock, immediate preparations were made to return the fire from their two 32-pounders and the two rifled guns already in position. In the absence of a Confederate or Virginia flag, Captain Peyton H. Colquitt of the Light Guard of Columbus, Georgia, who was in charge of the erection of the battery, called for the raising of the Georgia flag on the Sewells Point ramparts. Under the cover of darkness, the armed tug returned to Fort Monroe, but the Monticello remained off Sewells Point with her guns pointed in the direction of the Confederate fortifications. During the night, frantic efforts were made to complete the breastworks, and it was not until the next day at around 5:50 in the afternoon that the bombardment was resumed. It continued until 6:45 p.m. In the end, the Monticello, with several gaping holes in her hull from well-aimed Confederate shots limped back to Fort Monroe. The first engagement on Virginia soil during the Civil War was over.

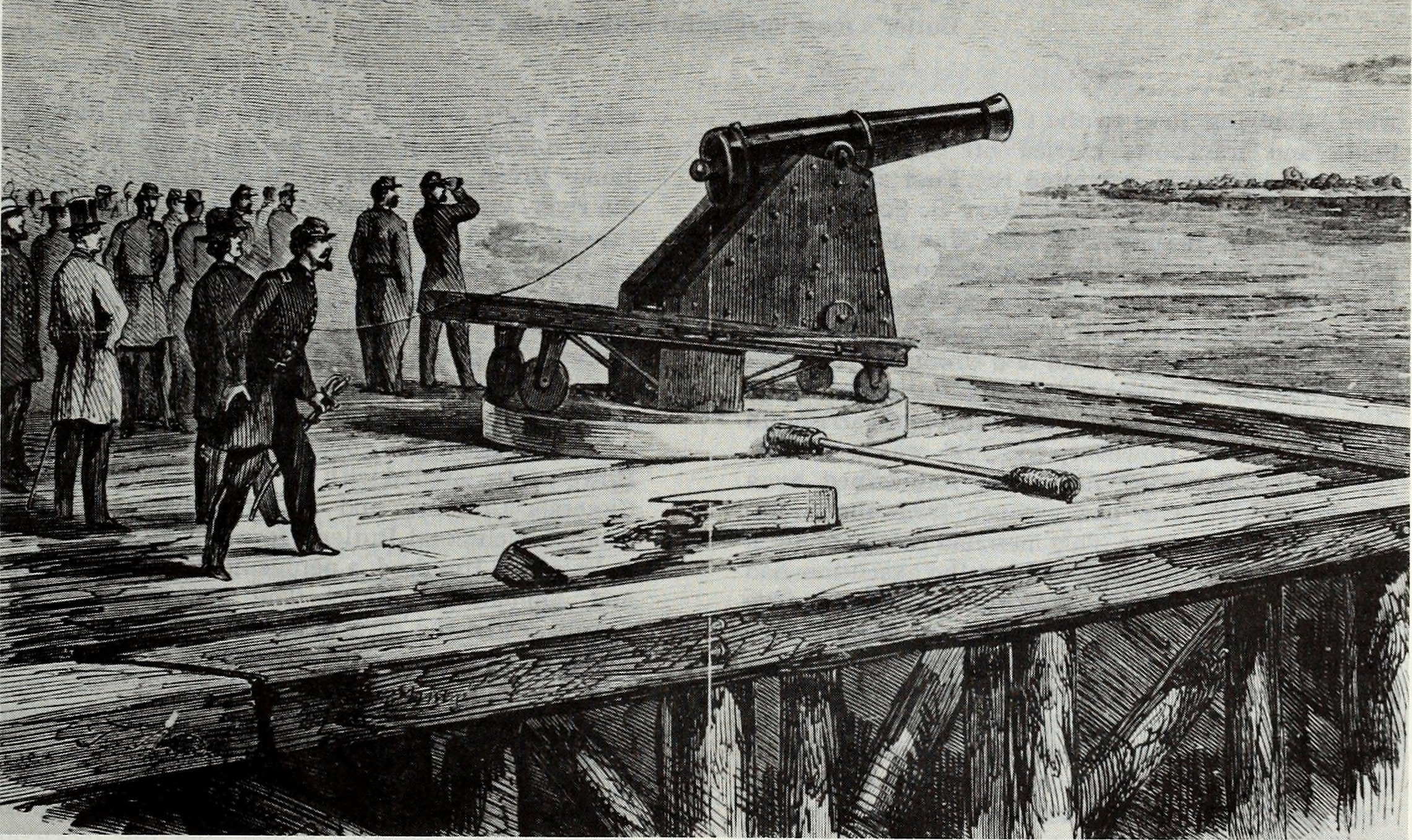
The Sawyer gun being demonstrated by Major General Benjamin Butler for Major General Wool at the Rip Raps (Fort Calhoun, later Fort Wool), 1861

There were no fatalities on either side. The only person wounded was a Confederate private who was struck by a fragment of a bursting shell. Subsequently, the Sewells Point batteries were under fire many times, but they were never silenced or captured in combat. A long-range rifled Sawyer gun of 24-pounder bore, firing 42-pound projectiles, was mounted at Fort Calhoun and shelled Sewells Point circa August 1861. Later, when Confederate forces evacuated Norfolk on May 10, 1862, the batteries were abandoned.

=== Battle of Hampton Roads ===
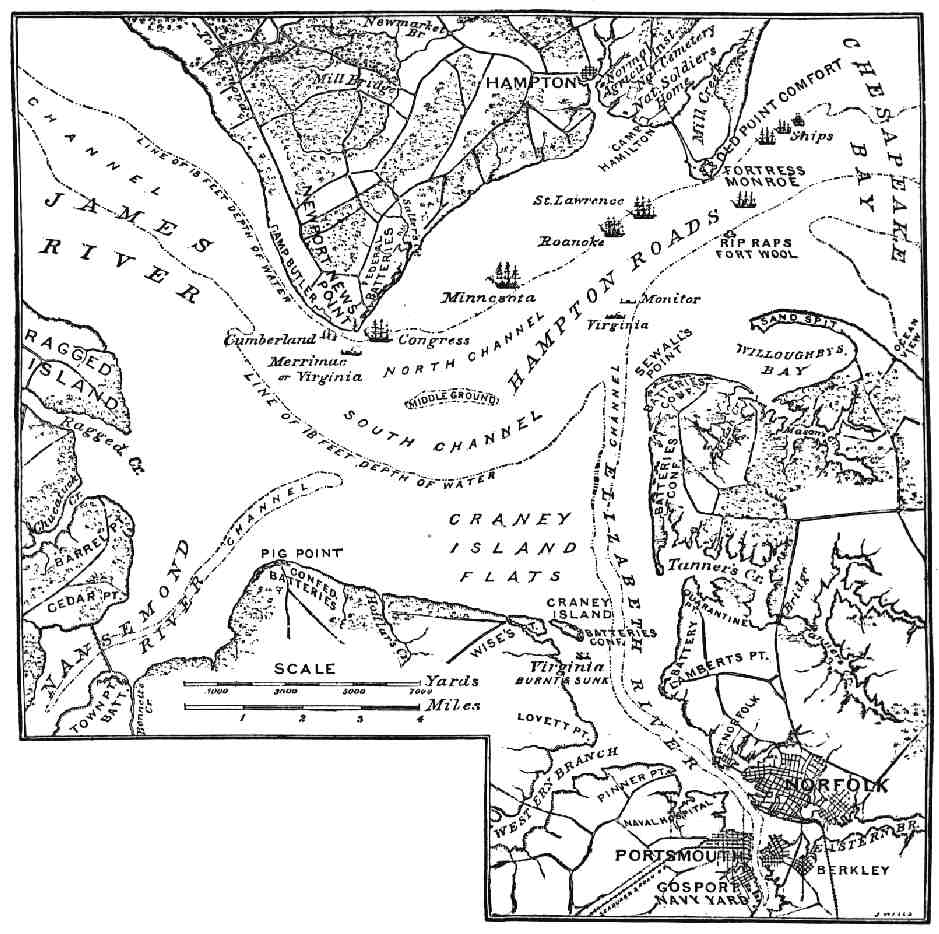
Battle of Hampton Roads, Virginia

The famous Battle of Hampton Roads took place off Sewells Point in Hampton Roads on March 8–9, 1862.

USS Monitor of the Union Navy faced CSS Virginia of the Confederate States Navy.

The battle, which was inconclusive, is chiefly significant in naval history as the first battle between two powered, ironclad warships.

=== Abraham Lincoln and the bombardment of Sewells Point ===
On May 5, 1862, President Lincoln, with his Cabinet Secretaries Stanton and Chase on board, proceeded to Hampton Roads on steamer Miami to personally direct the stalled Peninsular Campaign. The following day, Lincoln directed gunboat operations in the James River and the bombardment of Sewells Point by the blockading squadron in the five days he acted as Commander-in-Chief in the field.

On May 8, 1862, Monitor, Dacotah, Naugatuck, Seminole, and Susquehanna by direction of the President "-shelled Confederate batteries at Sewells Point, Virginia, as Flag Officer L. M. Goldsborough reported, "mainly with the view of ascertaining the practicability of landing a body of troops thereabouts" to move on Norfolk. Whatever rumors President Lincoln had received about Confederates abandoning Norfolk were now confirmed; a tug deserted and brought news that the evacuation was well underway and that CSS Virginia, with her accompanying small gunboats, planned to proceed up the James River or York River.

It was planned that when the Virginia came out, as she had on the 7th, the Union fleet would retire with the Monitor in the rear hoping to draw the powerful but under-engined warship into deep water where she might be rammed by high speed steamers. The bombardment uncovered reduced but still considerable strength at Sewells Point. The Virginia came out but not far enough to be rammed.

Two days later, President Lincoln, still acting as Commander-in-Chief, directed Flag Officer Goldsborough: "If you have tolerable confidence that you can successfully contend with the Merrimac [Lincoln and the North used the ships' former name] without the help of the Galena and two accompanying gunboats, send the Galena and two gunboats up the James River at once to support General McClellan." This division power afloat by the President silenced two shore batteries and forced gunboats CSS Jamestown and CSS Patrick Henry to return up the James River.

On May 9, 1862, President Lincoln himself, after talking to pilots and studying charts, reconnoitered to the eastward of Sewells Point and found a suitably unfortified landing site near Willoughby Point. The troops embarked in transports that night. The next morning they landed near the site selected by the President. The latter, still afloat, from his "command ship" Miami ordered the Monitor to reconnoiter Sewells Point to learn if the batteries were still manned. When he found the works abandoned, President Lincoln ordered Major General Wool's troops to march on Norfolk, where they arrived late on the afternoon of the 10th.

On May 10, 1862, Norfolk Navy Yard was set afire before being evacuated by Confederate forces in a general withdrawal up the peninsula to defend Richmond. Union troops crossed Hampton Roads from Fort Monroe, landed at Ocean View, and captured Norfolk. With the entire area back under Union control, the isolated batteries at Sewells Point lost their importance and were abandoned. For the remainder of the 19th century, the area was largely undeveloped and sparsely populated.

== Sewells Point in the 20th century ==
Early in the 20th century, two developments at Sewells Point would have a long-lasting effect on its role in US history. Each laid the groundwork for founding of what was to become the world's largest naval base.

The first could be described as a civilian battle, one of competition, between the growing railroad and industrial powers. The other had its beginning as a civilian celebration. These were the building of the Virginian Railway and the Jamestown Exposition.

=== Building the Virginian Railway ===
In the mid-1890s, William N. Page, a civil engineer who had previously worked building the Chesapeake and Ohio Railway (C&O) had a dream. He knew of rich untapped bituminous coal fields lying between the New River Valley and the lower Guyandotte River in southern West Virginia in an area not yet reached by the C&O and its major competitor, the Norfolk and Western Railway (N&W).

While the bigger railroads which were busy developing nearby areas and shipping coal via rail to Hampton Roads, he formed a plan. To take advantage of the undeveloped coal lands, Page enlisted several friends as investors to help purchase the land. In 1898, he acquired a small logging railroad, and converted and expanded it to become the intrastate (within West Virginia only) Deepwater Railway. The new short-line railroad planned to connect with the existing lines of the C&O along the Kanawha River at Deepwater and the N&W at Matoaka.

As Page developed his Deepwater Railway, he ran into a wall in negotiating to make connections and share favorable rates with either of the larger railroads. It was later revealed that the leaders of both the C&O and the N&W considered the territory to be potentially theirs for future growth. They secretly agreed to refuse to negotiate with Page and his upstart Deepwater Railway.

Page didn't give up as apparently was anticipated. Instead, he stubbornly continued building his Deepwater Railroad, to the increasing puzzlement of the two big railroads. They were unaware that one of Page's investors, who were silent partners in the venture, was financier and industrialist Henry Huttleston Rogers, a millionaire who had made his initial fortune as one of the key men with the Standard Oil Trust. Rogers wasn't about to have the investment foiled by the big railroads. Instead, he and Page set about secretly planning and securing their own route out of the mountains, all the way east across Virginia to Hampton Roads!

A separate company, the Tidewater Railway, was formed in Virginia for the portion to be in that state. Both planning and land acquisition were done largely in secret. One group of 35 surveyors posing as fishermen (on a Sunday in February) mapped out a crossing of the New River at Glen Lyn, Virginia, as well as the adjacent portion of the line from West Virginia through Narrows, Virginia. The new line essentially followed the valley of the Roanoke River through the Blue Ridge Mountains, and then was to run almost due east to the Hampton Roads area.

Deals were quietly struck with the various communities all along the way. Among these was Norfolk, the home-turf for the established Norfolk & Western Railway and its coal pier at Lambert's Point. Access to Hampton Roads frontage with enough adjoining land to build a new coal pier was crucial to the whole scheme. Undeveloped land was located at Sewells Point where the Page-Rogers interests purchased 1,000 feet (300 m) of frontage on Hampton Roads, and adjoining land. To facilitate building of the new railroad, Norfolk provided a right-of-way extending virtually completely around the city to reach Sewells Point.

With their land and route secured, in 1905, Page (with Rogers' identity still not revealed) began building the rest of the new railroad. By the time the larger railroads finally realized what was happening, their new competitor could not be successfully blocked. Rogers' identity and backing were finally disclosed more than a year later. Early in 1907, the Deepwater and Tidewater Railways, still under construction, were combined to become the Virginian Railway (VGN).

Aerial view looking east of Virginian Railway coal piers at Sewells Point, Virginia. The original 1909 pier is at the left. The larger pier to the right was completed in 1925.

About the same time, the Norfolk portion of the new Virginian Railway tracks had been completed. This proved just in time to serve the Jamestown Exposition, which was held on land just north of the VGN coal pier site at Sewells Point, which opened in the spring of 1907.

By using construction techniques not available when the larger railroads had been built about 25 years earlier, and paying for work with Rogers' own personal fortune, the new Virginian Railway was built to the highest standards. An engineering marvel of the day, the final spike in the VGN was driven on January 29, 1909.

In April 1909, Rogers was feted at Norfolk in celebration of the completion his new "Mountains to the Sea" railroad. He toured the railway's new $2.5 million coal pier at Sewells Point and Mark Twain spoke at a grand Norfolk banquet.

The Virginian Railway and its terminal location at Sewells Point played an important role in 20th-century US naval history. Located immediately adjacent to the former Exposition grounds (which became an important Navy facility beginning in 1917) the VGN transported the high quality smokeless bituminous coal favored by the US Navy for its ships.

When the VGN was merged with the Norfolk & Western in 1959, civilian coal loading was shifted to Lambert's Point, and the Navy purchased the site a few years later. The former VGN Sewells Point site is now part of the United States' Naval Station Norfolk.

=== Jamestown Exposition of 1907 ===
The Jamestown Exposition was one of the many world's fairs and expositions that were popular in the United States early part of the 20th century. It was held from April 26 to December 1, 1907, at Sewells Point to commemorate the 300th anniversary of the founding of the Jamestown Settlement in 1607.

Early in the 20th century, as the tercentennial neared, leaders in Norfolk began a campaign to have a celebration held there. The Association for the Preservation of Virginia Antiquities had gotten the ball rolling in 1900 by calling for a celebration honoring the establishment of the first permanent English colony in the New World at Jamestown, to be held on the 300th anniversary.

No one thought that the actual isolated and long-abandoned original site at Jamestown Island would be suitable. Jamestown had no facilities for large crowds, and the fort housing the Jamestown Settlement was believed to have been long-ago swallowed by the James River. However, there was an assumption in many parts of the state that Richmond, the state capital, would be chosen as the site of the celebration.

Hampton Roads' interest was awakened by an editorial in James M. Thomson's Norfolk Dispatch, on February 4, 1901, proclaiming: "Norfolk is undoubtedly the proper place for the holding of this celebration. Norfolk is today the center of the most populous portion of Virginia, and every historical, business and sentimental reason can be adduced in favor of the celebration taking place here rather than in Richmond."

The Dispatch was an unrelenting champion of Norfolk as the site for the exposition, noting in subsequent editorials that "Richmond has absolutely no claim to the celebration except her location on the James River."

By September 1901, the Norfolk City Council had given support to the project and in December, 100 prominent residents of Hampton Roads journeyed to Richmond to urge Norfolk as the site. In 1902, the Jamestown Exposition Co. was incorporated. Former Virginia Governor Fitzhugh Lee, nephew of General Robert E. Lee, was named its president.

The decision was made to locate the international exposition on a mile-long frontage at Sewells Point. The location was politically correct, as it was almost an equal distance from the cities of Norfolk, Portsmouth, Newport News and Hampton. Rural Sewells Point was also not conveniently located near any one of them. While hard to reach by land, it was more favorably accessible by water, which ultimately proved an asset.

The Jamestown Exposition proved to be a logistical nightmare. Roads had to be built to the site. Piers had to be constructed for moving supplies to exposition buildings. Hotels had to be raised to handle the exposition visitors, almost 3 million by the November closing. Bad weather slowed everything.

Another major setback was the death of Fitzhugh Lee. He died while in New England drumming up trade for the celebration. Henry St. George Tucker, another former Virginia Congressman, succeeded him. Norfolk businessman David Lowenberg ran most of the operation as director general.

Opening day had its share of headaches. Only a fifth of the electric lights could be turned on, and the Warpath recreation area was far from ready. Construction of the government pier left much of the ground in the center of the exposition muddy soup.

But in time, things improved and the event became spectacular. Planners asked each state of the union to contribute a house to celebrate its history and industry. Lack of interest or funds prevented participation by all, but 21 states funded houses, which bore their names: Pennsylvania House, Virginia House, New Hampshire House, North Carolina House, etc. During the exposition, days were set aside to honor the states individually. The governor of the state usually appeared to greet visitors to the state's house. Thirteen of the state houses can still be seen on Dillingham Boulevard at the Naval Station Norfolk, on what has been called "Admiral's Row." Many of them are now residences of high-ranking Navy officers.

US President Theodore Roosevelt was an honored guest. Mark Twain and Henry H. Rogers also paid a visit, in the latter's yacht "Kanawha". Twain's humorous talk was partly an introduction of Rear Admiral Purnell F. Harrington, former Commandant of the Norfolk Navy Yard. Said Twain, "In my remarks of welcome of Admiral Harrington, I am not going to give him compliments. Compliments always embarrass a man. You do not know what to say. It does not inspire you with words. There is nothing you can say in answer to a compliment. I have been complimented myself a great many times, and they always embarrass me. I always feel they have not said enough."

Although the exposition was a financial failure, it served an American purpose and one for Norfolk and Hampton Roads.

Perhaps the exposition's most impressive display was on water rather than land. Ships of two squadrons commanded by Admiral Robley Evans formed a continuing presence off Sewells Point. The assembly included sixteen battleships, five cruisers, and six destroyers. The fleet remained in Hampton Roads after the exposition closed and became President Roosevelt's Great White Fleet, which toured the globe as evidence of the nation's military might. Nearly every Congressman and Senator of prominence had attended the exposition, and Admirals in Norfolk urged the creation of a Naval Base at the exposition site. However, nearly 10 years would elapse before the idea, given impetus by World War I, would become a reality.

On June 28, 1917, President Woodrow Wilson set aside $2.8 million for land purchase and the erection of storehouses and piers for the base. Of the 474 acres (192 ha) originally acquired, 367 had been the old Jamestown Exposition grounds. The military property was later expanded considerably. The former Virginian Railway coal piers, land, and an adjacent coal storage facility owned by Norfolk & Western Railway were added in the 1960s and 1970s.

== Sewells Point in the 21st century ==
Naval Station Norfolk currently occupies Sewells Point. The base is approximately 4,000 acres (16.2 km^{2}) and is the largest naval base in the world.

The headquarters of the 5th Naval District, the Atlantic Fleet, the 2nd Fleet, the NATO Joint Force Command Norfolk and NATO Allied Command Transformation are there. The Naval Complex includes Naval Station Norfolk, NAS Norfolk, as well as other Naval Facilities of the Hampton Roads area.

When the 78 ships and 133 aircraft home ported there are not at sea, they are alongside one of the 14 piers or inside one of the 15 aircraft hangars for repair, refit, training and to provide the ship's or squadron's crew an opportunity to be with their families. The base is home port to aircraft carriers, cruisers, destroyers, large amphibious ships, submarines, and a variety of supply and logistics ships. Port Services controls more than 3,100 ships' movements annually as they arrive and depart their berths. Port facilities extend more than four miles (6.4 km) along the waterfront and include some seven miles (11 km) of pier and wharf space.

== See also ==
- Hampton Roads
- Battle of Hampton Roads
- Jamestown Exposition
- Virginian Railway
- Norfolk Navy Base
- Willoughby Spit
- Ocean View
- City of Norfolk
- Norfolk County
