= Interstate 295 (Maine) =

Highway in Maine

Interstate 295
- Richard A. Coleman Highway
- I-295 highlighted in red

Route information
- Auxiliary route of I-95
- Maintained by MaineDOT
- Length: 52 mi (84 km)
- Existed: 1960–present
- NHS: Entire route

Major junctions
- South end: I-95 / Maine Turnpike in Scarborough
- US 1 in South Portland; US 302 / SR 100 in Portland; SR 26 in Portland; I-495 in Falmouth; US 1 in Yarmouth; SR 125 / SR 136 in Freeport; US 1 in Brunswick; SR 196 in Topsham; US 201 in Libby Hill
- North end: I-95 / Maine Turnpike in West Gardiner

Location
- Country: United States
- State: Maine
- Counties: Cumberland, Sagadahoc, Kennebec

Highway system
- Interstate Highway System; Main; Auxiliary; Suffixed; Business; Future; Maine State Highway System; Interstate; US; State; Auto trails; Lettered highways
← SR 238	→ US 302

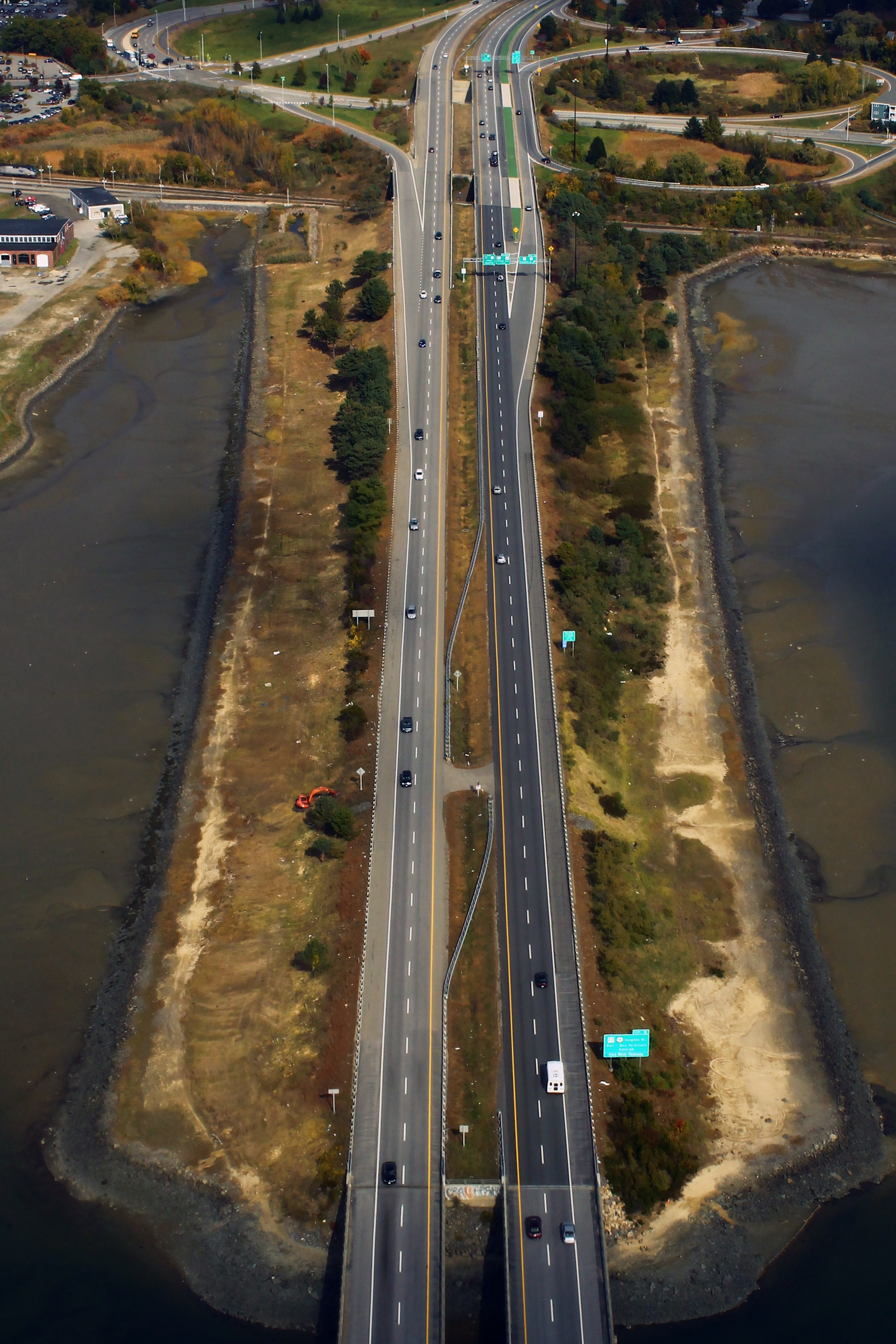
An aerial view of I-295 at exit 5

Interstate 295 (I-295) is a 52-mile-long (84 km) auxiliary Interstate Highway in the US state of Maine from I-95 in Scarborough to I-95 in West Gardiner. The highway was designated the Richard A. Coleman Highway in 2015 by the Maine Legislature. The highway serves as a bypass of Lewiston–Auburn and serves the Portland metropolitan area. It takes a more direct route between Portland and Augusta, the state capital, than its parent I-95. It also is toll-free, unlike I-95, which carries the tolled Maine Turnpike.

== Route description ==
I-295 branches off from exit 44 of I-95 (Maine Turnpike) providing access to downtown Portland, Maine, and then generally follows the Atlantic coast and Kennebec River until it merges back into I-95 in West Gardiner 52 miles (84 km) to the north at exit 103.

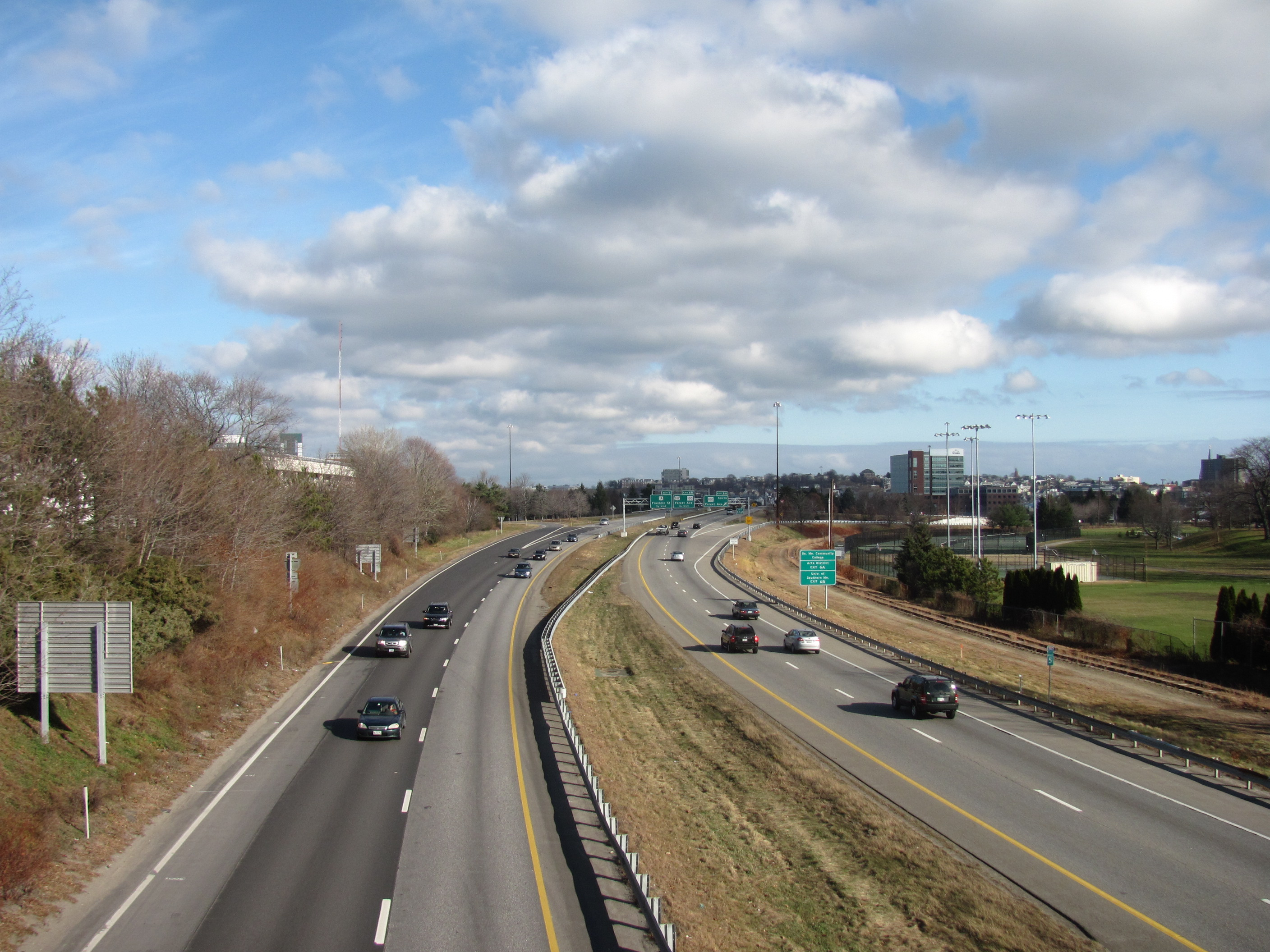
Northbound in Portland

After splitting from I-95, I-295 has a toll plaza just before its own exit 1. I-295's first exit is in South Portland, giving access to The Maine Mall (southbound) and South Portland and Scarborough (northbound). At exit 4, US Route 1 (US 1) joins I-295, and the two highways run concurrently for the next four miles (6.4 km). After crossing the Fore River, the highway passes through downtown Portland, which can be accessed via exits 4 through 8. North of the downtown area, I-295 crosses the Tukey's Bridge over the Back Cove, after which US 1 departs at exit 9. Running parallel with US 1, I-295 meets the eastern terminus of Falmouth Spur at exit 11 in the town of Falmouth, with a southbound exit and northbound entrance. After passing through Yarmouth and Freeport, exit 28 provides access to the town of Brunswick, where US 1 turns east away from I-295. Continuing north, the highway's last exit is exit 51, which gives access to Gardiner. After a toll plaza, I-295 merges back with I-95, which heads north toward Augusta. As an Interstate Highway, all of I-295 is included in the National Highway System, a network of roads important to the country's economy, defense, and mobility.

== History ==
=== 1960 to 2004 ===
In 1960, Tukey's Bridge was completed. It was named for Lemuel Tukey, a tavern owner and toll collector for the Back Cove Bridge in the late 18th century. The Falmouth Spur of the Maine Turnpike to Yarmouth opened the next year, in 1961.

Additional urban sections opened through Portland in 1971. This was followed in 1973 by the opening of I-295 through Brunswick to Topsham, then in 1974 by the opening of the section from the Maine Turnpike in Scarborough to South Portland. The section from Topsham to Gardiner opened in 1977.

=== 2004 extension ===
In 2004, to clear up confusion, I-95 was redesignated to continue along the Maine Turnpike for its entire length. I-295 was extended past the Falmouth Spur as a redesignation of I-95, to where it merges back into the turnpike in West Gardiner 42 miles (68 km) to the north. The four-mile (6.4 km) long Falmouth Spur officially became I-495 but was left unsigned.

At the same time, the exits were renumbered; previously they had been numbered more or less sequentially from south to north—there were skipped numbers, for example, there was no exit 23. After the changes the exits renumbered to mile-log in relation to the Scarborough junction, except for the exits in Portland and South Portland, which remained the same. Exits on I-95 in Maine were similarly renumbered based on mileage.

=== Speed limits ===
The speed limit on I-295 on the section past Tukey's Bridge to mile 51 in Gardiner was raised from 65 to 70 mph (105 to 113 km/h) on May 27, 2014. This occurred as the result of a new law passed in 2013 by the Maine Legislature allowing the Maine Department of Transportation (MaineDOT) to set speed limits on Interstate highways with the approval of the Maine State Police, instead of appealing to the Legislature. The speed limit was reverted from 70 to 65 mph (113 to 105 km/h) for a length of 22 miles (35 km) from the section past Tukey's Bridge to Topsham on March 27, 2017.

=== Naming ===
In 2015, the Maine Legislature unanimously voted to name the highway's entire length for Richard A. Coleman, a MaineDOT employee since 1956, who has been involved with many Maine transportation projects. He was involved in projects ranging from Maine's Interstates to the Penobscot Narrows Bridge and Observatory. Coleman declined comment on the naming, only telling the Kennebec Journal that while the naming is humbling, he found it uncomfortable. Maine Senator Roger Katz, the sponsor of the bill, said "Very few people have heard of Dick Coleman, but as he drives around the state, he must feel a great deal of pride looking at his decades of work."

== Emergency routes ==
In 2019, MaineDOT began signing emergency routes along roads near I-295. The routes generally lead from one exit to the next exit and are meant to be used when sections of the highway must be closed due to an accident or other disruption. In such an event, electronic signs will be activated and flaggers deployed to direct drivers to use the appropriate emergency route to lead them around the closure and maintain traffic flow. Northbound routes are designated with a single letter, while southbound routes are designated with double letters. This system was first used when a section of highway was closed due to the death of a Maine State Trooper in an accident.

== Exit list ==
County	Location	mi	km	Exit	Destinations	Notes
Cumberland	Scarborough	0.00	0.00		I-95 south / Maine Turnpike south – Kittery	Southern terminus; exit 44 on I-95 / Turnpike
Cumberland	Scarborough	0.55	0.89	Toll plaza		
Cumberland	South Portland	1.26	2.03	1	To US 1 (SR 9) – South Portland	Northbound exit only; access via SR 703
Cumberland	South Portland	1.26	2.03	1	To I-95 north / Maine Turnpike north / Maine Mall Road	Southbound exit and northbound entrance; access via SR 703; last southbound exit before toll
Cumberland	South Portland	1.99	3.20	2	To US 1 south (SR 9 west) – Scarborough, Old Orchard Beach	Southbound exit and northbound entrance; access via SR 701
Cumberland	South Portland	2.16	3.48	3	SR 9 (Westbrook Street) – Jetport	Southbound exit and northbound entrance
Cumberland	South Portland	3.19	5.13	4	Casco Bay Drive – Portland Waterfront	Northbound exit and southbound entrance
Cumberland	South Portland	3.19	5.13	4	US 1 south (Main Street)	Southbound exit and northbound entrance; southern end of US 1 concurrency
Cumberland	South Portland–Portland line	3.70	5.95	Fore River		
Cumberland	Portland	4.46	7.18	5	US 1A / SR 22 (Congress Street)	Signed as exits 5A (east) and 5B (west) southbound
Cumberland	Portland	5.35	8.61	6	US 302 west / SR 100 (Forest Avenue)	Signed as exits 6A (south) and 6B (north/west); eastern terminus of US 302
Cumberland	Portland	5.89	9.48	7	US 1A (Franklin Street)	
Cumberland	Portland	6.57	10.57	8	SR 26 south (Washington Avenue)	Southbound exit and northbound entrance; southern end of SR 26 concurrency
Cumberland	Portland	6.6	10.6	Tukey's Bridge over Back Cove		
Cumberland	Portland	6.73	10.83	8	SR 26 north (Washington Avenue)	Northbound exit and southbound entrance; northern end of SR 26 concurrency
Cumberland	Portland	6.97	11.22	9	US 1 south / SR 26 north (Washington Avenue) / Baxter Boulevard	Southbound exit and northbound entrance
Cumberland	Portland	7.12	11.46	9	US 1 north – Falmouth Foreside	Northbound exit and southbound entrance; northern end of US 1 concurrency
Cumberland	Falmouth	9.45	15.21	Ryan Quirion Guthrie Bridge over the Presumpscot River		
Cumberland	Falmouth	10.62	17.09	10	Bucknam Road to I-95 / Maine Turnpike / US 1 / SR 9 – Falmouth, Cumberland	I-95/Cumberland not signed southbound
Cumberland	Falmouth	11.00	17.70	11	To I-95 / Maine Turnpike – New Hampshire, Massachusetts	Southbound exit and northbound entrance; access via Falmouth Spur
Cumberland	Yarmouth	15.24	24.53	15	US 1 – Yarmouth, Cumberland	Northbound entrance added August 2013
Cumberland	Yarmouth	16.35	26.31	Royal River		
Cumberland	Yarmouth	17.24	27.75	17	US 1 – Yarmouth, Freeport	Freeport not signed southbound
Cumberland	Yarmouth–Freeport line	17.98	28.94	Cousins River		
Cumberland	Freeport	20.65	33.23	20	US 1 / Desert Road – Freeport	US 1 not signed northbound
Cumberland	Freeport	22.25	35.81	22	SR 125 / SR 136 (Mallet Drive) – Freeport, Durham	
Cumberland	Freeport	23.70	38.14	24	US 1 – Freeport	Northbound exit and entrance
Cumberland	Brunswick	28.38	45.67	28	US 1 (Coastal Route) – Brunswick, Bath	
Cumberland–Sagadahoc county line	Brunswick–Topsham line	30.02	48.31	Androscoggin River		
Sagadahoc	Topsham	31.04	49.95	31	SR 196 (Lewiston Road) – Topsham, Brunswick, Lisbon, Lewiston	Signed as exits 31A (east) and 31B (west) southbound; Brunswick/Lewiston not signed northbound; access to Bates College
Sagadahoc	Bowdoinham	37.10	59.71	37	SR 125 / SR 138 – Bowdoinham, Bowdoin	
Sagadahoc	Richmond	43.47	69.96	43	SR 197 – Richmond, Litchfield	
Kennebec	Gardiner	49.29	79.32	49	US 201 – Gardiner	
Kennebec	Gardiner–West Gardiner line	50.29	80.93	Cobbosseecontee Stream		
Kennebec	West Gardiner	51.48	82.85	51	SR 9 / SR 126 – Litchfield, Gardiner	Last northbound exit before toll
Kennebec	West Gardiner	51.70	83.20	Toll plaza		
Kennebec	West Gardiner	52.27	84.12	–	I-95 north / Maine Turnpike north – Augusta, Waterville	Northern terminus; exit 103 on I-95 / Turnpike
1.000 mi = 1.609 km; 1.000 km = 0.621 mi: Concurrency terminus; Incomplete access; Tolled
