= Maine State Route 24 =

State highway in Maine, US

State Route 24
- SR 24 in red, SR 24 Bus. in blue

Route information
- Maintained by MaineDOT
- Length: 43.98 mi (70.78 km)
- Existed: c. 1933–present

Major junctions
- South end: Bailey Island near Orr's Island in Harpswell
- US 1 in Brunswick
- North end: US 201 / SR 9 / SR 27 / SR 126 in Gardiner

Location
- Country: United States
- State: Maine
- Counties: Cumberland, Sagadahoc, Kennebec

Highway system
- Maine State Highway System; Interstate; US; State; Auto trails; Lettered highways
← SR 23	→ SR 25

State Route 24 (abbreviated SR 24) is part of Maine's system of numbered state highways, running from Bailey Island south of Orr's Island in Harpswell northward to Gardiner, passing through Brunswick along the way.

== Route description ==
SR 24 begins at an intersection with Abner Point Road on Bailey Island in the town of Harpswell. It formerly began at the southern tip of the island, where the road dead-ends. It proceeds northward through the "downtown" area of Harpswell on Orr's Island and continues onto mainland Maine where it crosses into the town of Brunswick.

SR 24 used to traverse downtown Brunswick, but now bypasses the downtown area. The route continues north until reaching the southern terminus of its business route, then interchanges with a freeway portion of US 1, which it then joins until it reaches SR 196. SR 24 exits US 1 to join Route 196 and both routes cross the Androscoggin River into Topsham. SR 24 splits off from Route 196 immediately after crossing the river and rejoins its former alignment.

SR 24 enters the town of Bowdoinham where it meets the northern terminus of SR 125 and turns northeast. SR 24 enters Richmond and briefly overlaps with SR 197 before continuing into Gardiner, paralleling the river at this point. SR 24 comes to an end in the heart of Gardiner at the intersection of Maine Avenue and Bridge Street (US 201, SR 9, SR 27, and SR 126).

== History ==
SR 24 between its southern terminus and the Androscoggin River crossing was formerly designated SR 124. It was renumbered to 24 in the early 1930s when the number 124 was reassigned to a completely new route. From Topsham, SR 24 was designated over a new routing to its current northern terminus in Gardiner and ultimately as far as Guilford.

From Gardiner, SR 24 used to run concurrently with US 201 and SR 27 to Sidney, a designation which was simply dropped following SR 24's truncation in 1954. The remainder of the route, which runs from Sidney to Guilford, was renumbered SR 23. This 1954 routing remains to the present.

=== Brunswick bypass and new business route ===
In 2014, SR 24 was removed from its existing alignment in downtown Brunswick and Topsham and routed along the US 1 freeway and the southernmost 1/2 mile (0.80 km) of SR 196 to bypass downtown. This re-routing reduced the overall length of SR 24 by approximately one mile (1.6 km) and eliminated its concurrency with US 201. Its existing alignment was redesignated SR 24 Business.

SR 24 departs its old alignment at the intersection of Gurnet and Bath Roads. Instead of turning left onto Bath Road, it now continues straight onto the US 1 bypass. It runs concurrently with US 1, then exits onto SR 196 northbound. SR 24 departs SR 196 at Bypass Road and rejoins its existing alignment at Elm Street in Topsham.

== Major intersections ==
County	Location	mi	km	Destinations	Notes
Cumberland	Harpswell	0.00	0.00	Harpswell Islands Road (dead end)	Southern terminus
Cumberland	Harpswell	5.86	9.43	Mountain Road – North Harpswell, South Harpswell	
Cumberland	Harpswell	9.88	15.90	Cundy's Harbor Road – Cundy's Harbor	
Cumberland	Brunswick	14.15	22.77	SR 24 Bus. north to SR 123 / Bath Road – Bath, Brunswick Executive Airport	Southern terminus of SR 24 Business
Cumberland	Brunswick	14.5	23.3	US 1 north – Bath, Wiscasset	Interchange; southern end of wrong-way concurrency with US 1
Cumberland	Brunswick	16.6	26.7	US 1 south to US 201 / I-295 south – Brunswick, Freeport	Interchange; northern end of wrong-way concurrency with US 1; eastern terminus of SR 196
Sagadahoc	Topsham	17.27	27.79	SR 196 north (Brunswick-Topsham Bypass) to US 201 / I-295 – Lewiston	Northern end of concurrency with SR 196
Sagadahoc	Topsham	17.38	27.97	SR 24 Bus. south (Elm Street) to US 201 – Topsham	Northern terminus of SR 24 Business
Sagadahoc	Bowdoinham	24.65	39.67	SR 125 (Main Street) to SR 138 / I-295 – Bowdoin	Northern terminus of SR 125
Sagadahoc	Richmond	32.75	52.71	SR 197 west (Main Street) to I-295 – Litchfield, Lewiston	Southern end of concurrency with SR 197
Sagadahoc	Richmond	33.24	53.49	SR 197 east (Front Street) – Dresden	Northern end of concurrency with SR 197
Kennebec	Gardiner	43.98	70.78	US 201 / SR 9 / SR 27 / SR 126 – Augusta, Randolph	Northern terminus
1.000 mi = 1.609 km; 1.000 km = 0.621 mi: Concurrency terminus

== Bannered business route ==
State Route 24 Business
- Location: Brunswick
- Existed: 2014–present

State Route 24 Business was designated in 2014 along the former alignment of SR 24 through downtown Brunswick and into Topsham, after the parent route was realigned to bypass downtown via US 1 and SR 196.
