= Maine State Route 125 =

Highway in Maine

State Route 125

Route information
- Maintained by MaineDOT
- Length: 22.16 mi (35.66 km)

Major junctions
- South end: US 1 in Freeport
- I-295 in Freeport; SR 9 / SR 196 in Lisbon Falls; US 201 in Bowdoin; I-295 in Bowdoinham
- North end: SR 24 in Bowdoinham

Location
- Country: United States
- State: Maine
- Counties: Cumberland, Androscoggin, Sagadahoc

Highway system
- Maine State Highway System; Interstate; US; State; Auto trails; Lettered highways
← SR 124	→ SR 126

State Route 125 (SR 125) is a north–south route in the U.S. State of Maine that runs between the towns of Freeport and Bowdoinham, passing through Lisbon Falls.

== Major intersections ==
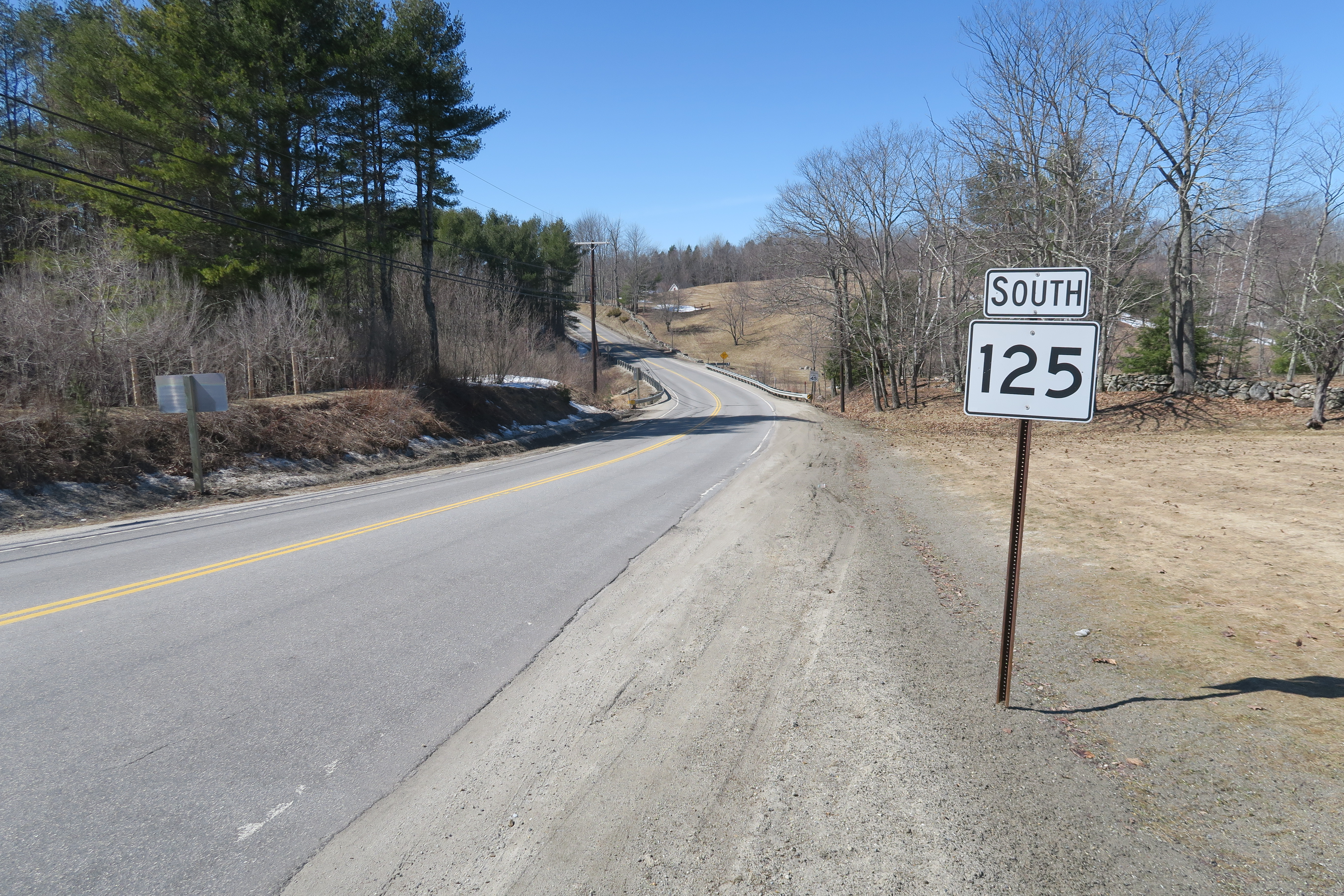
Signage for SR 125 in Bowdoin

County	Location	mi	km	Destinations	Notes
Cumberland	Freeport	0.00	0.00	US 1 (Main Street) / SR 136 begins – Freeport	Southern terminus of SR 136
Cumberland	Freeport	0.34– 0.55	0.55– 0.89	I-295 – Brunswick, Portland	Exit 22 (I-295)
Cumberland	Freeport	1.27	2.04	SR 136 north (Durham Road) – Durham	Northern end of concurrency with SR 136
Androscoggin	Durham	10.54	16.96	SR 9 west (Newell Brook Road) – Durham Center, Auburn	Southern end of concurrency with SR 9
Androscoggin	Lisbon	10.89	17.53	SR 9 east (Lisbon Street) / SR 196 – Lewiston, Topsham	Northern end of concurrency with SR 9
Sagadahoc	Bowdoin	18.83	30.30	US 201 north (Augusta Road) – Gardiner	Southern end of concurrency with US 201
Sagadahoc	Bowdoin	18.92	30.45	US 201 south (Augusta Road) – Brunswick	Northern end of concurrency with US 201
Sagadahoc	Bowdoinham	20.57	33.10	SR 138 south (Post Road) – Brunswick	Southern end of concurrency with SR 138
Sagadahoc	Bowdoinham	20.63– 20.81	33.20– 33.49	I-295 – Augusta, Brunswick	Exit 37 (I-295)
Sagadahoc	Bowdoinham	21.50	34.60	SR 138 north (Post Road)	Northern end of concurrency with SR 138
Sagadahoc	Bowdoinham	22.16	35.66	SR 24 (River Road) – Richmond, Topsham	
1.000 mi = 1.609 km; 1.000 km = 0.621 mi: Concurrency terminus
