= Maine State Route 196 =

State highway in Maine, US

State Route 196

Route information
- Maintained by MaineDOT
- Length: 19.41 mi (31.24 km)
- Existed: 1925–present

Major junctions
- West end: US 202 / SR 11 / SR 100 in Lewiston
- I-95 / Maine Turnpike in Lewiston; I-295 in Topsham; US 201 in Topsham
- East end: US 1 / SR 24 in Brunswick

Location
- Country: United States
- State: Maine
- Counties: Androscoggin, Sagadahoc, Cumberland

Highway system
- Maine State Highway System; Interstate; US; State; Auto trails; Lettered highways
← SR 195	→ SR 197

State Route 196 (SR 196) is a state highway in the U.S. state of Maine. It connects Lewiston to Brunswick, following the Androscoggin River valley.

== Route description ==
ME 196 begins at a junction with US 202, ME 11, and ME 100 in downtown Lewiston and heads southeast. It begins as two one way roads through downtown as Canal Street and Lisbon Street. The two roads then merge together as it exits downtown and ME 196 continues as Lisbon Street. The route runs by the Androscoggin River and interchanges Alfred A. Plourde Parkway, which gives access to I-95 from the highway. The route then passes under I-95 and heads through Lisbon. It becomes concurrent with ME 9 until it reaches the intersection of ME 125, where ME 9 terminates. The route continues along the Androscoggin River heading southeast. It interchanges I-295 heading into Topsham. It intersects US 201, then becomes a two-lane expressway before intersecting ME 24 and crossing over the Androscoggin River, where it reaches its southern terminus at US 1 at a directional T interchange

== Major junctions ==
County	Location	mi	km	Destinations	Notes
Androscoggin	Lewiston	0.00	0.00	US 202 / SR 11 / SR 100 (Main Street)	Western terminus
Androscoggin	Lewiston	2.31	3.72	I-95 / Maine Turnpike – Augusta, Portland	Interchange; no westbound exit; access via Alfred A. Plourde Parkway; exit 80 on I-95 / Turnpike
Androscoggin	Lewiston	2.69	4.33	To I-95 / Maine Turnpike	Access via Pleasant Street
Androscoggin	Lisbon	10.31	16.59	SR 9 west (Ridge Road) to I-95 / Maine Turnpike – Sabattus	Western end of SR 9 concurrency
Androscoggin	Lisbon	11.14	17.93	SR 9 east / SR 125 (Main Street) – West Bowdoin, Durham	Eastern end of SR 9 concurrency
Sagadahoc	Topsham	16.71– 17.00	26.89– 27.36	I-295 – Augusta, Portland	Exit 31 on I-295
Sagadahoc	Topsham	17.60	28.32	US 201 (Main Street) – Brunswick, Richmond	
Sagadahoc	Topsham	17.60	28.32	Western end of limited-access section	
Sagadahoc	Topsham	18.88	30.38	SR 24 north (Bypass Drive) – Richmond	At-grade intersection; western end of SR 24 concurrency
Cumberland	Brunswick	19.41	31.24	US 1 (SR 24 south) – Cooks Corner, Bath, Brunswick	Eastern terminus; eastern end of SR 24 concurrency
1.000 mi = 1.609 km; 1.000 km = 0.621 mi: Concurrency terminus; Incomplete access
