= Maine State Route 9 =

Highway in Maine

State Route 9
- Route of SR 9 highlighted in red; SR 9 Bus. in green

Route information
- Maintained by MaineDOT
- Length: 289.27 mi (465.53 km)
- Existed: 1925, 2007 (current alignment)–present

Major junctions
- West end: NH 9 / NH 236 at the New Hampshire state line in Berwick
- I-95 / Maine Turnpike in Wells; US 1 in Wells; US 302 in Portland; I-95 / Maine Turnpike in West Gardiner; I-295 in West Gardiner; US 201 / US 202 in Augusta; US 1A / SR 9 Bus. in Bangor
- East end: Ferry Point International Bridge at the Canadian border in Calais

Location
- Country: United States
- State: Maine
- Counties: York, Cumberland, Androscoggin, Kennebec, Waldo, Penobscot, Hancock, Washington

Highway system
- Maine State Highway System; Interstate; US; State; Auto trails; Lettered highways
← SR 8	→ SR 9A
← Route 8	N.E.	→ Route 10

State Route 9 (SR 9) is a numbered state highway in Maine, running from the New Hampshire border at Berwick in the west to the Canada–US border with New Brunswick at Calais in the east. SR 9 runs a total of 289 miles (465 km).

== Route description ==
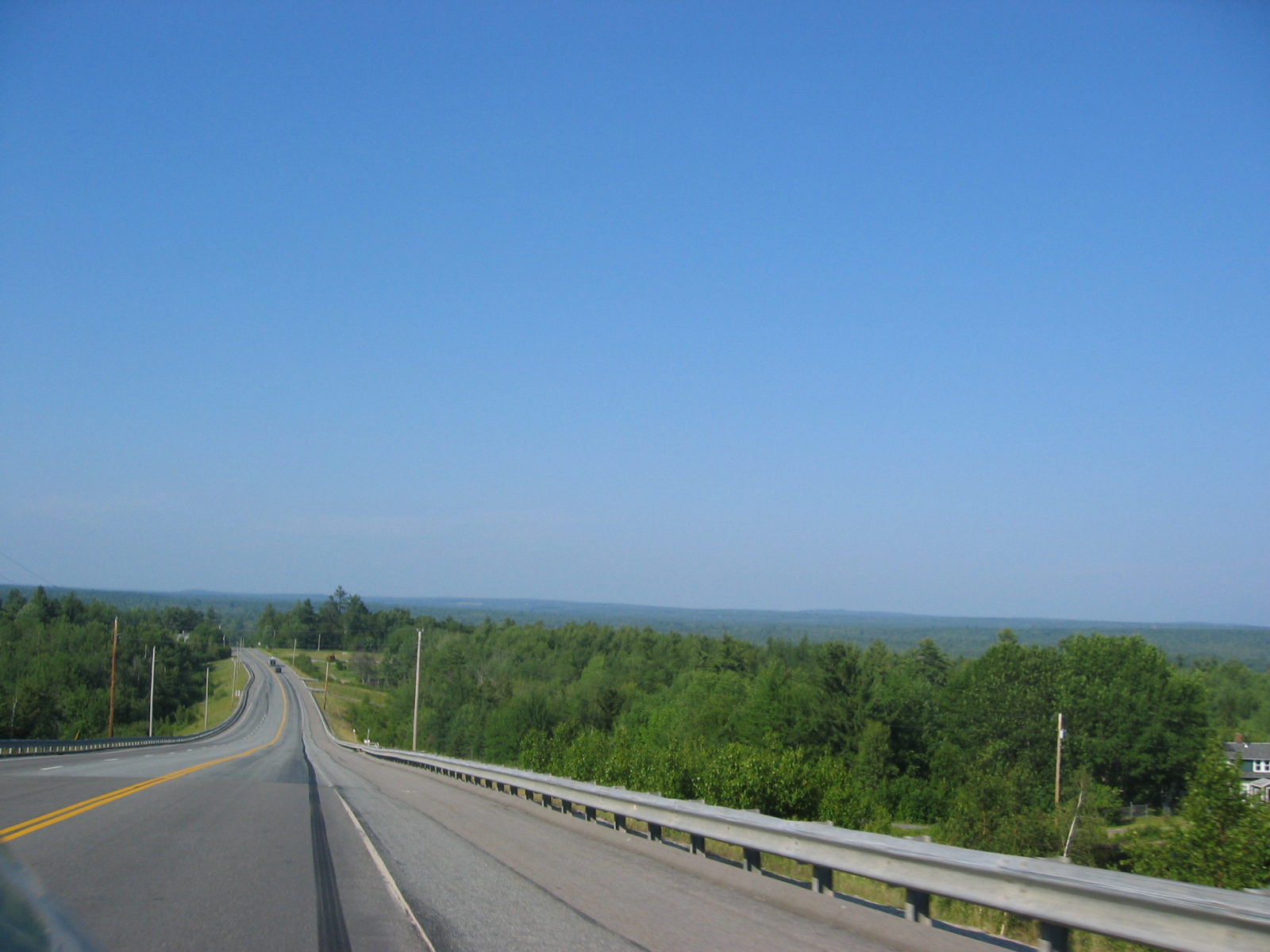
Maine State Route 9 east of Bangor.

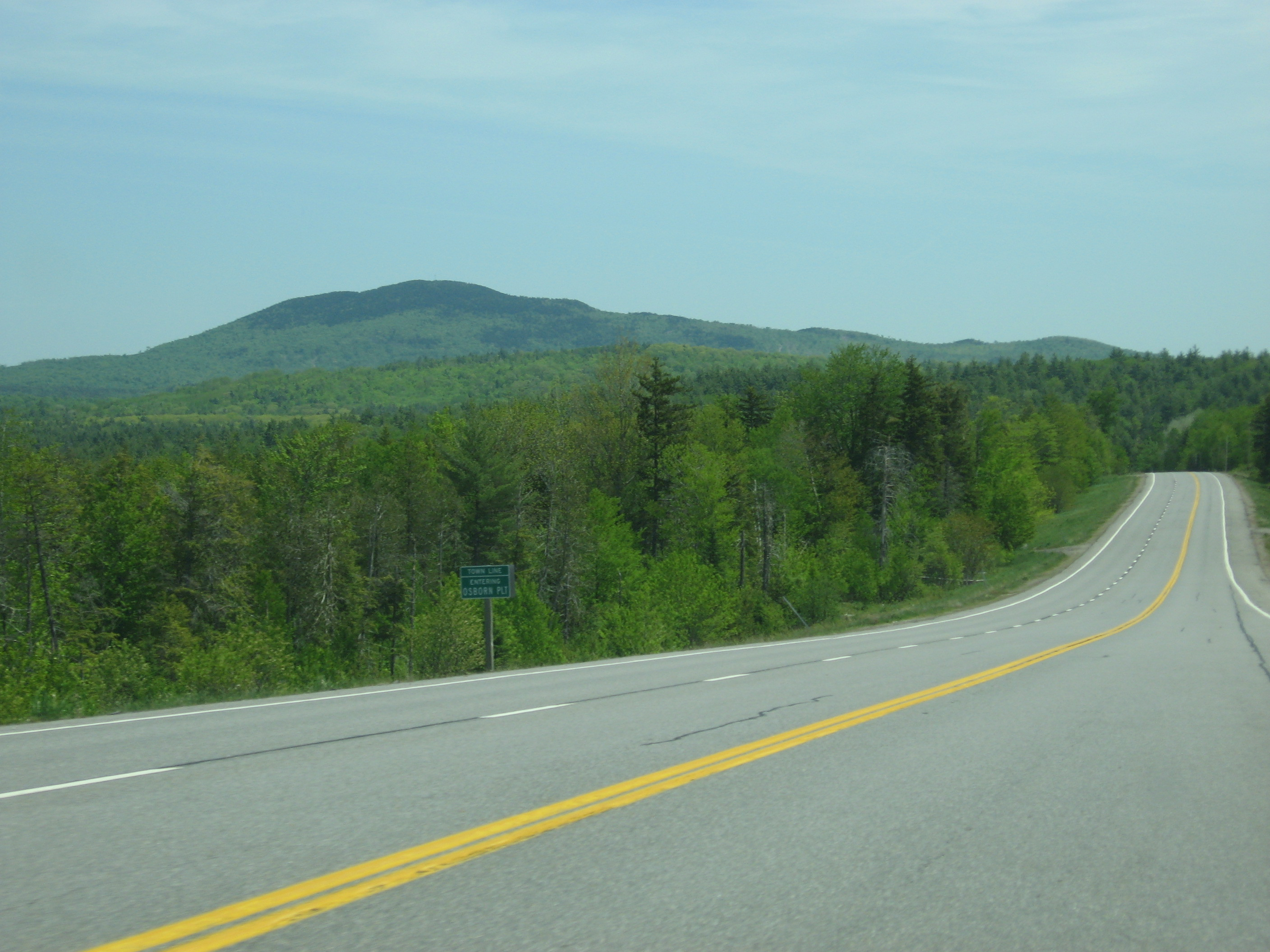
Looking east to Lead Mountain along State Route 9

State Route 9 is a meandering highway that works its way from New Hampshire to Canada. It frequently runs concurrently with other highways listed below and also frequently changes direction.

State Route 9 runs through most of Maine's major cities including Biddeford, Saco, South Portland, Portland, Augusta, and Bangor.

Over the years, a number of improvements have been made by the Route 9 Committee, a partnership of local government officials and business interests in the Baileyville-Calais area.

=== The Airline ===
The leg from Bangor to Calais is often referred to as "The Airline," commonly thought to be because of its shorter route than the older U.S. 1. (Before the coming of air travel, the term airline often referred to such a shortcut.) Although anecdotes about unexploded ordnance deriving from bombers flying from the former Dow Air Force Base (now Bangor International Airport) using a number of towers and landmarks along "The Airline", in fact the term goes back to the early 1850s as a contrast to the shoreline route. The last section of "The Airline" was paved in 1973 in Crawford and many old sections of the road are visible to the side of the present roadway. The "Whale's Back", a two-mile stretch built atop an esker in Hancock County was one of the most notable features of the highway until it was rebuilt.

=== Bypass of Brewer ===
Plans to extend I-395 connecting it to SR 9 began as early as 2001. In February 2008, MaineDOT suggested five possible routes to extend I-395 to SR 9, with two in particular designated as "State's Choice" and "Holden's Choice". The state approved the "Holden's Choice" route, designated 2B-2. All three affected communities issued resolutions in 2014 opposing this route.

The state went forward with the project not as an I-395 extension but as a 5.5-mile (9 km) super two rerouting of SR 9. The design was finalized in 2021, with construction commencing in 2022.

MaineDOT completed the project with a ribbon cutting ceremony on June 27, 2025. When it opened, the existing segment of Route 9 that ran through the downtown areas of Hampden, Brewer and Bangor became Route 9 Business.

== Junction list ==
County	Location	mi	km	Destinations	Notes
York	Berwick	0.0	0.0	NH 9 west / NH 236 west (Market Street) – Somersworth	Continuation into New Hampshire
York	Berwick	0.2	0.32	SR 236 (Allen Street) – South Berwick	Northern terminus of SR 236
York	North Berwick	7.2	11.6	SR 4 south (Elm Street)	Southern terminus of concurrency
York	North Berwick	7.6	12.2	SR 4 north (High Street) – Sanford	Northern terminus of concurrency
York	Wells	11.4	18.3	SR 9B (Littlefield Road) – Ogunquit	Western terminus of SR 9B
York	Wells	13.5	21.7	SR 9A (Crediford Road) – Sanford	Western terminus of SR 9A
York	Wells	14.3	23.0	SR 109 north (Sanford Road) – Sanford	Northern terminus of concurrency
York	Wells	14.9	24.0	I-95 / Maine Turnpike	Maine Turnpike exit 19
York	Wells	16.5	26.6	US 1 south (Post Road) – Ogunquit; SR 109	Southern terminus of SR 109; Southern terminus of US 1/SR 9 concurrency
York	Wells	18.3	29.5	US 1 north (Post Road) – Kennebunk	Northern terminus of US 1/SR 9 concurrency
York	Kennebunk	22.5	36.2	SR 9A / SR 35 (Port Road) – Kennebunk Center via Dock Square, Kennebunkport	Eastern terminus of SR 9A; Southern terminus of SR 35
York	Biddeford	31.8	51.2	SR 208 south (Bridge Road) – Biddeford Pool	Southern terminus of concurrency
York	Biddeford	37.1	59.7	SR 111 (Alfred Street) / SR 208 – Arundel, Kennebunk	Eastern terminus of SR 111; Northern terminus of SR 208
York	Saco	38.1	61.3	US 1 south (Elm Street) – Biddeford US 1 north / SR 5 south (Main Street) – Scarborough SR 5 / SR 112 north (North Street) – Buxton	Southern terminus of SR 112
York	Old Orchard Beach	45.7	73.5	SR 5 to SR 98 (Old Orchard Street)	Southern terminus of SR 5
Cumberland	Scarborough	51.1	82.2	US 1 south – Saco	Southern terminus of concurrency
Cumberland	Scarborough	54.2	87.2	SR 114 (Gorham Road) – Gorham; SR 207 (Black Point Road)	Southern terminus of SR 114; Northern terminus of SR 207
Cumberland	Scarborough	55.4	89.2	To I-95 / I-295 / Maine Turnpike (Scarborough Connector) – Portland	Partial interchange
Cumberland	South Portland	56.7	91.2	To I-95 / I-295 / Maine Turnpike (Maine Turnpike Approach)	Unsigned SR 703
Cumberland	South Portland	56.8	91.4	US 1 north (Main Street) – South Portland	Northern terminus of concurrency
Cumberland	South Portland	57.6	92.7	I-295 north – Portland	I-295 exit 3; partial interchange No access to SR 9 from I-295 north
Cumberland	Portland	59.4	95.6	To I-95 / Maine Turnpike (Skyway Drive)	Maine Turnpike exit 46
Cumberland	Portland	59.7	96.1	SR 22 west (Congress Street)	Western terminus of concurrency
Cumberland	Portland	61.2	98.5	SR 22 east (Congress Street)	Eastern terminus of concurrency To I-295 / US 1
Cumberland	Portland	61.2	98.5	SR 25 (Brighton Avenue)	
Cumberland	Portland	62.6	100.7	US 302 east / SR 100 south (Forest Avenue)	Southern terminus of concurrency To I-295 / US 1
Cumberland	Portland	62.7	100.9	US 302 west / SR 100 north (Forest Avenue)	Northern terminus of concurrency
Cumberland	Portland	63.9	102.8	SR 26 (Washington Avenue) – Gray, Munjoy Hill	To I-295 / US 1
Cumberland	Falmouth	67.3	108.3	To I-295 / US 1 (Bucknam Road)	I-295 exit 10
Cumberland	North Yarmouth	74.3	119.6	SR 115 east (Walnut Hill Road) – Yarmouth	Southern terminus of concurrency
Cumberland	North Yarmouth	74.6	120.1	SR 115 west (Walnut Hill Road) – Gray, Pineland Center	Northern terminus of concurrency
Androscoggin	Durham	86.9	139.9	SR 136 south (Royalsborough Road) – Freeport	Southern terminus of concurrency
Androscoggin	Durham	87.3	140.5	SR 136 north (Royalsborough Road) – Auburn	Northern terminus of concurrency
Androscoggin	Durham	91.1	146.6	SR 125 south (Pinkham Brook Road) – Freeport	Southern terminus of SR 9/125 concurrency
Androscoggin	Lisbon	91.4	147.1	SR 125 north (Main Street) – West Bowdoin SR 196 east (Lisbon Street) – Topsham	Northern terminus of SR 9/125 concurrency Eastern terminus of SR 9/196 concurrency
Androscoggin	Lisbon	92.2	148.4	SR 196 west (Lisbon Street) – Lewiston	Western terminus of SR 9/196 concurrency
Androscoggin	Sabattus	99.3	159.8	I-95 / Maine Turnpike – Gardiner, Augusta, Lewiston, Portland	Maine Turnpike exit 86
Androscoggin	Sabattus	100.7	162.1	SR 126 west (Sabattus Street) – Lewiston	Western terminus of concurrency
Androscoggin	Sabattus	101.7	163.7	SR 132 (Wales Road) – Wales, Monmouth	Southern terminus of SR 132
Androscoggin	Sabattus	102.9	165.6	SR 197 (Litchfield Road) – Richmond	Western terminus of SR 197
Kennebec	West Gardiner	117.3	188.8	I-95 south / Maine Turnpike south – Lewiston, Auburn	Maine Turnpike exit 102; partial interchange
Kennebec	West Gardiner	117.4	188.9	I-295 to I-95 north / Maine Turnpike north – Augusta, Brunswick	I-295 exit 51
Kennebec	Gardiner	120.5	193.9	US 201 south (Brunswick Avenue) – Brunswick	Southern terminus of US 201/SR 9/126 concurrency
Kennebec	Gardiner	120.9	194.6	US 201 / SR 27 north (Maine Avenue) – Hallowell, Augusta; SR 24 (Maine Avenue) – Richmond	Northern terminus of US 201/SR 9 concurrency Western terminus of SR 9/27/126 concurrency Northern terminus of SR 24
Kennebec	Randolph	121.1	194.9	SR 27 south / SR 126 east (Water Street) – Randolph, USVA Togus, Wiscasset	Eastern terminus of SR 9/27/126 concurrency
Kennebec	Augusta	126.8	204.1	SR 17 east (Eastern Avenue) – USVA Togus, Rockland	Southern terminus of wrong-way concurrency with SR 17
Kennebec	Augusta	127.3	204.9	US 202 west / US 201 / SR 17 / SR 100 south to I-95 south – Gardiner, Winthrop; SR 105 (Cony Street) – Windsor	Northern terminus of wrong-way concurrency with SR-17; Southern terminus of US 201/202/SR 9/100 concurrency Western terminus of SR 105
Kennebec	Augusta	127.9	205.8	US 201 / SR 100 north (Riverside Drive) – Waterville	Northern terminus of US 201/SR 9/100 concurrency
Kennebec	Augusta	128.9	207.4	SR 3 west (Augusta Bypass) to I-95 – Waterville, Portland	Western terminus of US 202/SR 3/9 concurrency
Kennebec	China	138.1	222.3	SR 32 north (Vassalboro Road)	Western terminus of concurrency
Kennebec	China	139.3	224.2	SR 32 south (Windsor Road) – Windsor	Eastern terminus of concurrency
Kennebec	China	139.5	224.5	SR 3 east (Belfast Road) – Belfast	Eastern terminus of US 202/SR 3/9 concurrency
Kennebec	China	146.6	235.9	SR 137 west (Waterville Road) – Winslow	Western terminus of concurrency
Kennebec	Albion	153.9	247.7	SR 137 east (Belfast Road) – Freedom	Eastern terminus of concurrency
Waldo	Unity	160.2	257.8	SR 139 west (School Street)	Western terminus of US 202/SR 9/139 concurrency
Waldo	Unity	161.1	259.3	SR 139 east / SR 220 south (Thorndike Road)	Eastern terminus of US 202/SR 9/139 concurrency Southern terminus of US 202/SR 9/220 concurrency
Waldo	Troy	164.1	264.1	SR 220 north (Detroit Road)	Northern terminus of US 202/SR 9/220 concurrency
Penobscot	Dixmont	170.8	274.9	SR 7 (Moosehead Trail) – Newport, Brooks	
Penobscot	Dixmont	173.0	278.4	SR 143 (Simpson Corner Road) – Etna	Southern terminus of SR 143
Penobscot	Newburgh	181.4	291.9	SR 69 to I-95 (Carmel Road) – Carmel, Winterport	
Penobscot	Hampden	187.5	301.8	SR 9 Bus. east – Hampden	Western terminus of SR 9 Bus.
Penobscot	Bangor	192.4	309.6	I-395 west / SR 15 north to I-95 – Bangor, Brewer, Orono, Newport	Exit 2 on I-395; western terminus of I-395/SR 9 concurrency, eastern terminus of US 202
Penobscot	Bangor	192.7	310.1	US 1A / SR 9 Bus. / Farm Road (Main Street) – Downtown Bangor, Hampden	Exit 3 on I-395
Penobscot	Brewer	193.4	311.2	SR 15 south / SR 15 Bus. north (South Main Street) – Brewer	Exit 4 on I-395, eastern end of SR 15 concurrency
Penobscot	Brewer	194.1	312.4	Industrial Park Road / Parkway South – Brewer	Exit 5 on I-395
Penobscot	Brewer	195.9	315.3	US 1A east to US 1 (Coastal Route) – Ellsworth, Bar Harbor	Exit 6A on I-395
Penobscot	Brewer	196.2	315.8	I-395 ends / US 1A west (Wilson Street) – Brewer	Exit 6B and eastern terminus of I-395, beginning of the segment that opened in 2025
Penobscot	Eddington	201.5	324.3	SR 9 Bus. west – Downtown Brewer	End of the segment that opened in 2025, Eastern terminus of SR 9 Bus.
Penobscot	Eddington	205.3	330.4	SR 46 (Jarvis Gore Drive) – Holden	Northern terminus of SR 46
Penobscot	Clifton	207.7	334.3	SR 180 (Rebel Hill Road) – Otis, Ellsworth	Northern terminus of SR 180
Hancock	Amherst	218.1	351.0	SR 181 – Ellsworth	Northern terminus of SR 181
Hancock	Aurora	220.2	354.4	SR 179 – Ellsworth	Northern terminus of SR 179
Washington	Beddington	234.2	376.9	SR 193 (Beddington Road) – Deblois, Cherryfield	Northern terminus of SR 193
Washington	Wesley	259.1	417.0	SR 192 (Jr. Williams Road) – Machias	Northern terminus of SR 192
Washington	Baileyville	281.9	453.7	US 1 north – Baileyville, Houlton	Western terminus of US 1/SR 9 concurrency
Washington	Baring	283.2	455.8	SR 191 – Machias	Northern terminus of SR 191
Washington	Calais	286.6	461.2	To Route 1 (International Drive) – Saint John NB	Rotary;International Avenue Bridge - As of 2010, all commercial vehicles must use this border crossing
Washington	Calais	287.2	462.2	To Route 170 – Milltown NB	Milltown International Bridge
Washington	Calais	288.8	464.8	US 1 south (Main Street) – Machias	Eastern terminus of US 1/SR 9 concurrency
Washington	Calais	289.2	465.4	To Route 170	Ferry Point International Bridge; Eastern terminus of SR 9
1.000 mi = 1.609 km; 1.000 km = 0.621 mi: Concurrency terminus; Incomplete access; Tolled

== Auxiliary route ==
State Route 9 Business
- Location: Hampden–Eddington
- Length: 13.0 mi (20.9 km)
- Existed: 2025–present

State Route 9 Business (abbreviated SR 9 Bus. or SR 9B) is a 13.0-mile (20.9 km) business route of SR 9. Its western terminus is at US 202 and SR 9 in Hampden. Its eastern terminus is at SR 9 in Eddington.

SR 9 Business was designated in 2025 after SR 9 was rerouted to bypass the downtown areas of Hampden, Brewer, and Bangor via US 202 and I-395.

Junction list

The entire route is in Penobscot County.

Location	mi	km	Destinations	Notes
Hampden	0.0	0.0	US 202 / SR 9 – Bangor, Unity	Western terminus of SR 9B
Hampden	0.3	0.48	US 1A west (Main Road) – Winterport	Western terminus of US 1A/SR 9B concurrency
Bangor	4.3	6.9	I-395 / SR 9 / SR 15 to I-95 – Brewer, Ellsworth, Orono, Newport	I-395 exit 3
Brewer	5.8	9.3	US 1A east (Wilson Street) – Ellsworth, Bar Harbor SR 15 Bus. south to I-395 / SR 9 / SR 15 – Bucksport	Eastern terminus of US 1A concurrency, Western terminus of SR 15B concurrency
Brewer	6.0	9.7	SR 15 Bus. north (Betton Street)	Eastern terminus of SR 15B concurrency
Brewer	6.1	9.8	State Street (former US 1A) SR 178 north	Southern terminus of SR 178
Eddington	10.2	16.4	SR 178 north (Riverside Drive) – Old Town	Eastern terminus of SR 9B/SR 178 concurrency
Eddington	13.0	20.9	SR 9 – Calais, Brewer	Eastern terminus of SR 9B
1.000 mi = 1.609 km; 1.000 km = 0.621 mi: Concurrency terminus

== See also ==
- New England Interstate Route 9
