= Maine State Route 138 =

State highway in Sagadahoc County, Maine, US

State Route 138

Route information
- Maintained by MaineDOT
- Length: 9.48 mi (15.26 km)

Major junctions
- South end: US 201 in Bowdoin
- SR 125 in Bowdoinham; I-295 in Bowdoinham; SR 197 in Richmond
- North end: US 201 in Richmond

Location
- Country: United States
- State: Maine
- Counties: Sagadahoc

Highway system
- Maine State Highway System; Interstate; US; State; Auto trails; Lettered highways
← SR 137	→ SR 139

State Route 138 (SR 138) is part of Maine's system of numbered state highways, located entirely in Sagadahoc County. It runs from U.S. Route 201 (US 201) in Bowdoin, to Interstate 295 (I-295) while running concurrent with SR 125 for one mile (1.6 km). It then reaches SR 197 in Richmond, and ends at the junction with US 201 in Richmond.

== Route description ==
SR 138 begins at an intersection with US 201 in Bowdoin. It heads east towards I-295, and SR 125 in Bowdoinham, where the two state routes run concurrent for one mile (1.6 km). After splitting from SR 125 in Bowdoinham, SR 138 heads north through Richmond, where it intersects SR 197 and terminates at US 201 in Richmond.

== Junction list ==
The entire route is in Sagadahoc County.

Location	mi	km	Destinations	Notes
Bowdoin	0.00	0.00	US 201	
Bowdoinham	1.32	2.12	SR 125 south – Bowdoin Ctr.	Southern end of SR 125 concurrency
Bowdoinham	1.38– 1.56	2.22– 2.51	I-295 – Augusta, Brunswick	Exit 37 on I-295
Bowdoinham	2.25	3.62	SR 125 north	Northern end of SR 125 concurrency
Richmond	9.25	14.89	SR 197 – Litchfield, Richmond	
Richmond	9.48	15.26	US 201 – Augusta, Brunswick	
1.000 mi = 1.609 km; 1.000 km = 0.621 mi: Concurrency terminus
