= Maine State Route 197 =

East-west state highway in Maine, US

State Route 197

Route information
- Maintained by MaineDOT
- Length: 20.54 mi (33.06 km)

Major junctions
- West end: SR 9 / SR 126 in Sabattus
- US 201 in Richmond; I-295 in Richmond; SR 24 in Richmond
- East end: SR 27 in Dresden

Location
- Country: United States
- State: Maine
- Counties: Androscoggin, Kennebec, Sagadahoc, Lincoln

Highway system
- Maine State Highway System; Interstate; US; State; Auto trails; Lettered highways
| ← SR 196 | → SR 198 |

State Route 197 (SR 197) is a 20.54-mile-long (33.06 km) east-west state highway in the US state of Maine.

== Route description ==
SR 197 begins in Sabattus at the intersection with SR 9 and SR 126. This intersection is SR 197's western terminus. SR 197 heads east. From the corner it is called Litchfield Road. SR 197 then crosses the Sabattus-Wales town line, and then the Wales-Litchfield town line entering Kennebec County, as Litchfield Road becomes Richmond Road instead. SR 197 then passes over Interstate 95. Even though it is an east–west highway, it takes a sharp curve and heads south, and then it takes an easterly turn. The route enters Sagadahoc County and Bowdoin briefly and becomes County Rd. It SR 197 then enters Richmond intersects U.S. Route 201, called Brunswick Rd (northbound) and Augusta Rd (southbound). and intersects SR 138. SR 197 continues to head east. It then and crosses the West Branch Denham Stream before coming to an interchange with on and off ramps onto Interstate 295. SR 197 continues to head east. In downtown Richmond, it has a concurrency with SR 24. SR 24 then branches off SR 197. A bridge carries SR 197 across the Kennebec River, into Lincoln County, and into the town of Dresden. It then junctions SR 128, crosses the Eastern River, and turns onto Middle Rd (This is also a junction with the northern terminus of SR 127). SR 197 continues along Middle Rd until the intersection with SR 27, where SR 197 has its eastern terminus.

== Major junctions ==
| County | Location | mi | km | Destinations | Notes |
|---|---|---|---|---|---|
| Androscoggin | Sabattus | 0.00 | 0.00 | SR 9 / SR 126 (Sabattus Road) – Lewiston, Gardiner | |
| Kennebec | No major junctions | | | | |
| Sagadahoc | Richmond | 10.53 | 16.95 | US 201 (Brunswick) – Gardiner, Topsham | |
| Sagadahoc | Richmond | 10.70 | 17.22 | SR 138 (Post Road) – Bowdoinham | |
| Sagadahoc | Richmond | 11.68– 11.87 | 18.80– 19.10 | I-295 – Augusta, Brunswick | Exit 43 (I-295) |
| Sagadahoc | Richmond | 15.39 | 24.77 | SR 24 south (River Road) – Topsham | Western end of SR 24 concurrency |
| Sagadahoc | Richmond | 15.85 | 25.51 | SR 24 north (River Road) – Gardiner | Eastern end of SR 24 concurrency |
| Lincoln | Dresden | 16.92 | 27.23 | SR 128 (Cedar Grove Road) – Woolwich | |
| Lincoln | Dresden | 18.40– 18.51 | 29.61– 29.79 | SR 127 south (Middle Road) – Woolwich | Western end of SR 127 concurrency |
| Lincoln | Dresden | 20.54 | 33.06 | SR 27 (Gardiner Road) / SR 127 ends – Gardiner, Augusta, Wiscasset | Eastern end of SR 127 concurrency |
1.000 mi = 1.609 km; 1.000 km = 0.621 mi: Concurrency terminus

== See also ==
- Portal:U.S. Roads
