= Bowman House (Dresden, Maine) =

Historic house in Maine, United States

- Bowman-Carney House
- U.S. National Register of Historic Places
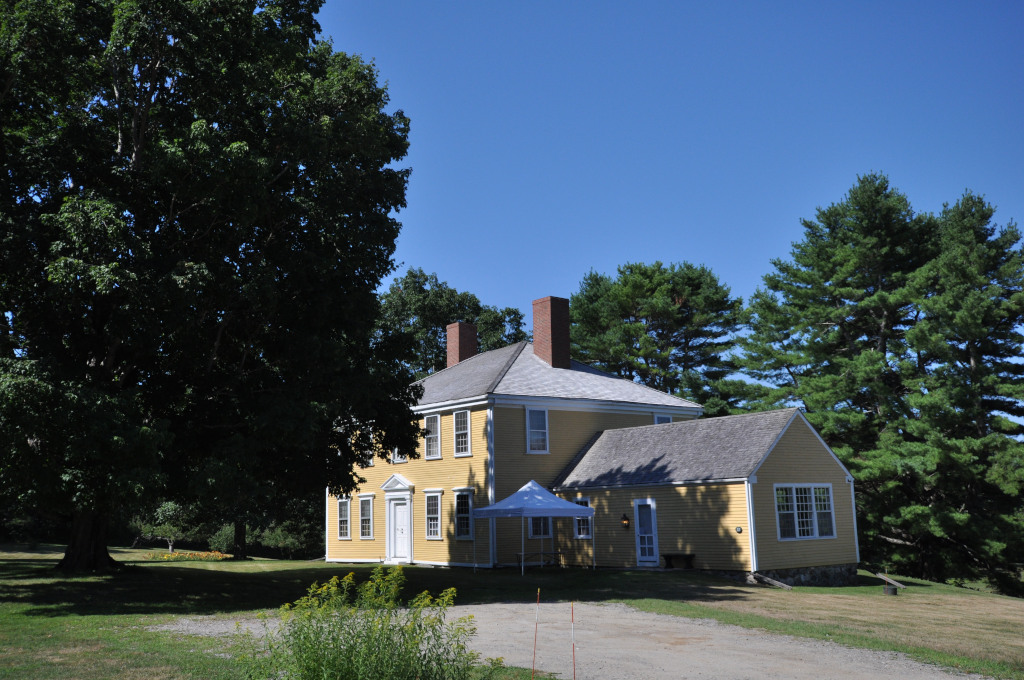
- Bowman House in 2022

- Location within Maine Location within the United States
- Location: Bowman Ln., off 128, Dresden, Maine
- Coordinates: 44°5′45″N 69°46′23″W
- Area: 7 acres (2.8 ha)
- Built: 1762
- Architect: Flagg, Gersham
- Architectural style: Colonial
- NRHP reference No.: 71000071
- Added to NRHP: April 7, 1971

The Bowman House is a historic house museum on Bowman Lane, off Maine State Route 128, in Dresden, Maine, United States. It was built in 1762, early in the area's colonial settlement history, and later served as the office of an ice harvesting business. The house was listed on the National Register of Historic Places on April 7, 1971, under the name Bowman-Carney House. It is now a museum owned and managed by Historic New England.

== Description and history ==
The Bowman House stands on the eastern bank of the Kennebec River, about 1,200 feet (370 m) north of Maine State Route 197, and a similar distance west of Maine State Route 128. Five of its seven acres are cleared, providing a view overlooking the river. The house is a 2 1/2-story wood-frame structure, five bays wide, with a hip roof, two interior chimneys, clapboard siding, and a stone foundation. Its main facades, facing toward the river and Route 128, are essentially identical, with centered entrances framed by pilasters, entablature, and gabled pediment. A single-story ell, probably of 19th-century construction, extends to one side. The interior retains many 18th-century features, include wide floors of pumpkin pine, wall paneling, and trim.

The town of Dresden was originally part of Pownalborough, settled in 1754 and incorporated in 1760, which was the first shire town of Lincoln County. This house was built in 1762 for Jonathan Bowman by Gersham Flagg, a local master builder who had recently completed the Pownalborough Courthouse. Bowman was a leading citizen, serving as a judge of probate, and engaged in a variety of economically important local businesses. In the 19th century it came into the hands of James Carney, a blacksmith whose work supported maritime trade, and the house came to be known as the Bowman-Carney House. The property was later adapted for use in the ice harvesting business, with the house converted into an office, and ice storage sheds lining the river. This business peaked in the 1870s, and crashed by the turn of the 20th century. It was then purchased by the daughters of historian Henry S. Burrage, who recognized its historic significance and contributed to its preservation.

Ms. Burrage's friend, William Waters, born and raised in Blakely, Georgia, bought the home and spent close to 40 years investing-in, restoring and enjoying the home and property, including tracking down most all of the original furniture built in 1760 for the home by an expert craftsman in Boston. William was an artist (a student of Lamar Dodd), New York designer and owner of a few successful businesses, including The Firehouse and Lilac Antiques. Waters' family originally hailed from Baltimore and for generations the family antiques were handed down, many of which ended up with Waters, including for example a family grandfather clock.

In 1971, Waters donated the house to Historic New England, retaining a life tenancy. Waters died in 2016. In 2021, Historic New England opened the house as a museum under the name "Bowman House".

== See also ==
- National Register of Historic Places listings in Lincoln County, Maine
