= Maine State Route 127 =

North-south state highway in Maine, US

State Route 127

Route information
- Maintained by MaineDOT
- Length: 25.64 mi (41.26 km)

Major junctions
- South end: Seguinland Road in Georgetown
- US 1 in Woolwich; SR 128 in Woolwich; SR 197 in Dresden
- North end: SR 27 in Dresden

Location
- Country: United States
- State: Maine
- Counties: Sagadahoc, Lincoln

Highway system
- Maine State Highway System; Interstate; US; State; Auto trails; Lettered highways
← SR 126	→ SR 128

State Route 127 (SR 127) is a state highway running between Dresden and Georgetown in the U.S. state of Maine.

== Route description ==
The route starts to the east of Georgetown, and goes in towards the center of the settlement before turning north towards Arrowsic. Passing through Arrowsic, the route then passes through Woolwich and Dresden before terminating at SR 27.

== History ==
SR 127 was originally created in 1925 and ran between Gardiner and Wiscasset. The following year, that route became SR 27, and SR 127 was moved to its current route. SR 127 originally ran to the shoreline, but in 2003, it was truncated to a rural intersection.

== Junction list ==
County	Location	mi	km	Destinations	Notes
Sagadahoc	Georgetown	0.0	0.0	Seguinland Road	Southern terminus
Sagadahoc	Woolwich	10.4	16.7	US 1 south – Bath, Brunswick	Southern end of US 1 concurrency
Sagadahoc	Woolwich	10.7	17.2	US 1 north – Wiscasset, Newcastle	Northern end of US 1 concurrency
Sagadahoc	Woolwich	12.6	20.3	SR 128 north – Dresden	Southern terminus of SR 128
Lincoln	Dresden	23.3	37.5	SR 197 west	Eastern terminus of SR 197
Lincoln	Dresden	25.6	41.2	SR 27 – Gardiner, Augusta, Wiscasset	Northern terminus
1.000 mi = 1.609 km; 1.000 km = 0.621 mi: Concurrency terminus
