= Maine State Route 128 =

North-south state highway in Maine, US

State Route 128

Route information
- Maintained by MaineDOT
- Length: 15.2 mi (24.5 km)

Major junctions
- South end: SR 127 in Woolwich
- SR 197 in Dresden
- North end: SR 27 in Dresden

Location
- Country: United States
- State: Maine
- Counties: Sagadahoc, Lincoln

Highway system
- Maine State Highway System; Interstate; US; State; Auto trails; Lettered highways
← SR 127	→ SR 129

State Route 128 (SR 128) is part of Maine's systems of numbered state highways, running from SR 127 in Woolwich, passing SR 197 in Dresden, and ending at SR 27 at Dresden.

== Route description ==
SR 128 begins at SR 127 in Woolwich. It heads northwest, running parallel with the Kennebec River. It proceeds northward to SR 197 in Dresden, and then, it heads further north and then east towards its northern terminus at SR 27 at Dresden.

== History ==
SR 128 was created in 1925 and originally ran between Wiscasset and Boothbay Harbor. In 1926, the road was realigned to its present location.

== Junction list ==
County	Location	mi	km	Destinations	Notes
Sagadahoc	Woolwich	0.0	0.0	SR 127 (Middle Road) – Bath, Dresden Mills, Woolwich	Southern terminus of SR 128
Lincoln	Dresden	11.4	18.3	SR 197 (Patterson Road) – Dresden Mills, Richmond	
Lincoln	Dresden	15.2	24.5	SR 27 (Gardiner Road) – Gardiner, Wiscasset	Northern terminus of SR 128
1.000 mi = 1.609 km; 1.000 km = 0.621 mi
