= 2023 Bowdoin–Yarmouth shootings =

Spree shooting in Maine, U.S.

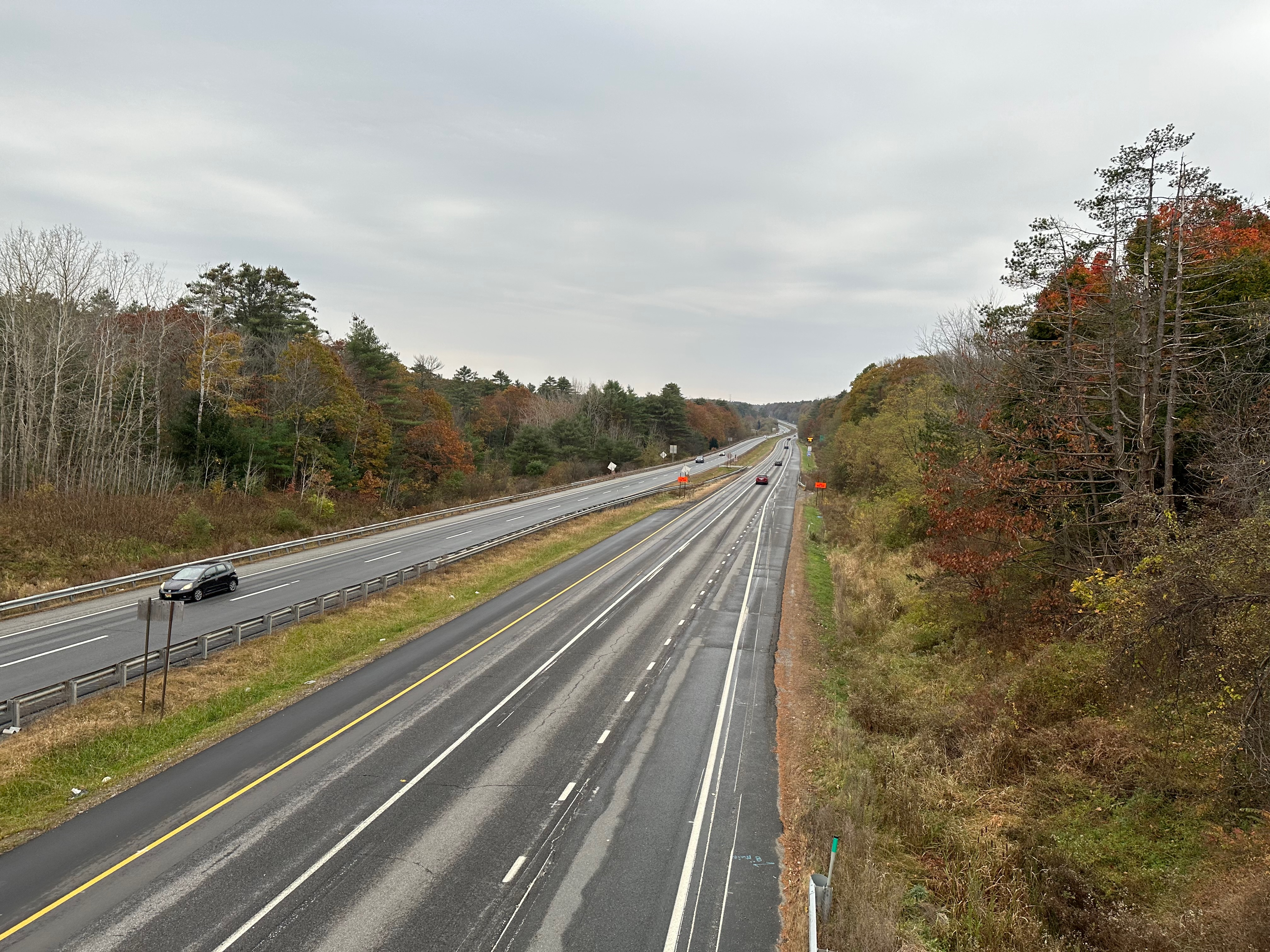
- The section of Interstate 295 southbound in Yarmouth, Maine, where some of the shootings occurred
- Location: Bowdoin and Yarmouth, Maine, U.S.
- Date: April 18–19, 2023
- Attack type: Mass shooting, spree shooting, familicide
- Weapon: Firearm
- Deaths: 4
- Injuries: 3
- Perpetrator: Joseph Eaton

On April 17, 2023, 34-year-old Joseph Eaton shot his parents and two of their close friends to death at their home in Bowdoin, Maine, United States. The next morning, he fired shots at several vehicles, seemingly randomly, along Interstate 295 in Yarmouth. In addition to damaging several vehicles, he wounded three members of one family in one of the vehicles, one critically. He said later that he shot at the vehicles because he thought they were police.

The perpetrator, who had a long history of mental illness and drug addiction and had recently been released from prison for unrelated charges, was taken into custody that day. On July 1, 2024, Eaton pleaded guilty to the murders and was sentenced to life in prison. He died in prison on October 28, 2025, at the age of 36.

== Shooting ==
The first shooting happened at a rural property in Bowdoin, where four people—the parents of the suspected shooter and their long-time friends—were killed. One person was found dead in the barn, and the other three were found in the house.

The next day, the shooter then drove 40 minutes south to the Yarmouth area. He opened fire indiscriminately at several cars on Interstate 295 southbound, between exits 17 and 15, wounding a 59-year-old man and his son and daughter, both in their 20s. The daughter was seriously wounded.

== Perpetrator ==
Joseph Eaton, 34, was arrested and charged with four counts of murder on April 18 after police located and detained him off Interstate 295. Police say he subsequently confessed to the killings of his mother and father and a couple, described as the parents' best friends, in Bowdoin, as well as to shooting at vehicles along the interstate highway.

Eaton started drinking alcohol and using recreational drug and steroids at a young age. He has had multiple mental health diagnoses, most recently borderline personality disorder, and says he was sexually assaulted by two babysitters and another person. According to a forensic psychologist who has not met him personally, borderline personality disorder is associated with symptoms such as "poor impulse control, minimization of responsibility, and justification of violence because he was treated unfairly". Eaton was upset that when he was released from prison, most people, including his two ex-wives, did not welcome him back into their lives.

Eaton had a substantial criminal record before the shooting. He had previously been convicted of crimes in Kansas, Maine, and Florida, on charges such as burglary, drunk driving, and aggravated assault. At least three women, including both ex-wives, broke up with him after he physically assaulted them. In 2018, he assaulted three police officers with a baseball bat in Florida, in what he says was an attempted suicide by cop. This resulted in a three-year prison sentence in Florida, plus two years in the Maine Correctional Center in Windham, because the Florida assault violated the terms of probation for a previous conviction in Maine. He was released from the Maine facility four days before the shootings. His mother picked him up from the prison; his parents, whom he described as "the absolute epitome of unconditional love", paid for a hotel, and bought new clothes for him.

On October 28, 2025, Eaton died in custody at a Massachusetts correctional facility after suffering a medical emergency. Officials said no foul play was suspected, and the cause of death remains under investigation.

== Charges ==
For his actions in Bowdoin, Eaton was charged with four counts of murder for the family and family friends he killed, one count of aggravated cruelty to animals for killing a dog, plus nine charges for stealing firearms from his mother and the friends he killed, and one count of possession of a firearm by a prohibited person.

For his actions in Yarmouth, Eaton was indicted on 11 criminal counts, including three counts of attempted murder for the people he injured on the highway. Eaton said that he opened fire on the cars because he thought they were police cars.

In July 2023, he entered pleas of both not guilty and not criminally responsible. Later, in December 2023, he withdrew the not criminally responsible plea.

On July 1, 2024, he pleaded guilty in the shooting and was sentenced to life in prison.

== See also ==
- 2023 Lewiston shootings, shootings that occurred in Lewiston, Maine, in October 2023
- List of mass shootings in the United States in 2023
