= Airline (disambiguation) =

An airline is a company that provides air transport services for passengers and/or freight.

Airline or Air Line may also refer to:

== Television ==
- Airline (1982 TV series), a British television series
- Airline (1998 TV series), a British television series
- Airline (American TV series) (2004–2005)
- Airlines (Indian TV series)

== Other uses ==
- Airline (brand), a line of consumer electronics sold by Montgomery Ward
- Airlines (video game), a simulation game
- Air line, air-line, or airline, a tube that carries a compressed air supply
- "The Airline", a leg of State Route 9 in Maine, US
- Air Line, Georgia, a community
- Airline Highway, a highway in Louisiana, US
- Air-line railroad, a relatively flat and straight railroad
- Airline State Park, a park in Connecticut, US
- The Emirates Air Line, former name of the London Cable Car across the River Thames
- Santa Monica Air Line, a former interurban train route in Santa Monica, California
- Airline Inthyrath, American drag queen also known as Jujubee
- Airline (magazine), a Japanese magazine

== See also ==
- Airline Road (disambiguation)
- Airliner
