= Airline Road =

Airline Road may be:

- The Airline, a portion of Maine State Route 9
- Airline Road in Weidman, Michigan
- Airline Road in Eads, Tennessee
- Airline Road near Walnut Creek
- Airline Road in Norton Shores, Michigan
- Airline Road (Singapore)
