= Maine State Route 136 =

State highway in Maine, US

State Route 136

Route information
- Maintained by MaineDOT
- Length: 19.07 mi (30.69 km)

Major junctions
- South end: US 1 / SR 125 in Freeport
- I-295 in Freeport; SR 9 in Durham
- North end: US 202 / SR 11 / SR 100 in Auburn

Location
- Country: United States
- State: Maine
- Counties: Cumberland, Androscoggin

Highway system
- Maine State Highway System; Interstate; US; State; Auto trails; Lettered highways
← SR 135	→ SR 137

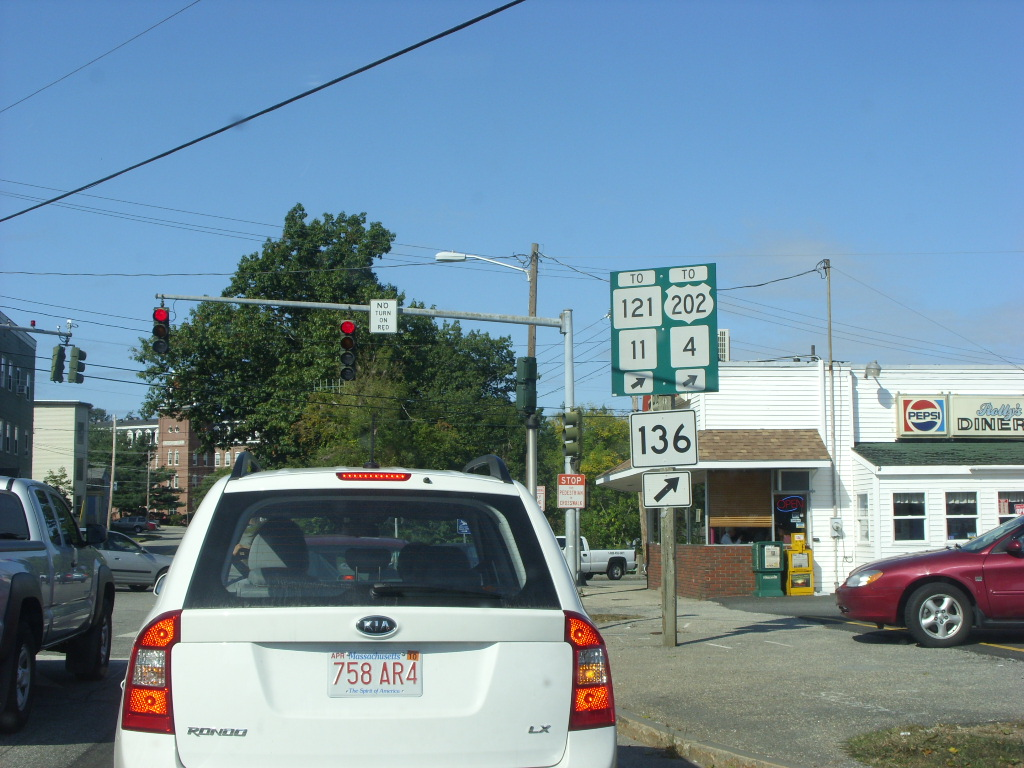
Maine State Route 136 in Auburn

State Route 136 (SR 136) is a numbered state highway in Maine, United States. It begins with SR 125 at the junction of U.S. Route 1 (US 1) in Freeport, and travels to Auburn. Although it is only approximately 19 miles (31 km) long, it connects three major Maine commerce areas (Lewiston, Auburn, and Freeport as well as points south).

== Major junctions ==
County	Location	mi	km	Destinations	Notes
Cumberland	Freeport	0.00	0.00	US 1 (Main Street) / SR 125 begins	Southern end of SR 125 concurrency
Cumberland	Freeport	0.34– 0.55	0.55– 0.89	I-295 – Brunswick, Portland	Exit 22 (I-295)
Cumberland	Freeport	1.27	2.04	SR 125 north (Griffin Road) – Lisbon, Lisbon Falls	Northern end of SR 125 concurrency
Androscoggin	Durham	8.56	13.78	SR 9 south (Hallowell Road) – Pownal, Bradbury Mountain State Park	Southern end of SR 9 concurrency
Androscoggin	Durham	8.95	14.40	SR 9 north (Newell Brook Road) – Lisbon Falls	Northern end of SR 9 concurrency
Androscoggin	Auburn	19.07	30.69	US 202 / SR 11 / SR 100 (Court Street)	
1.000 mi = 1.609 km; 1.000 km = 0.621 mi: Concurrency terminus
