= Libby Hill, Maine =

Unincorporated area in Maine, United States of America

Coordinates: 44°10′57″N 69°49′32″W

Libby Hill is a village in the city of Gardiner in Kennebec County, Maine, United States. It is located near the intersection of U.S. Route 201 and Interstate 295 in western Gardiner. The village is the home of the city of Gardiner's Libby Hill Business Park.
