= Bowdoin, Maine =

Town in Maine, United States

- Town
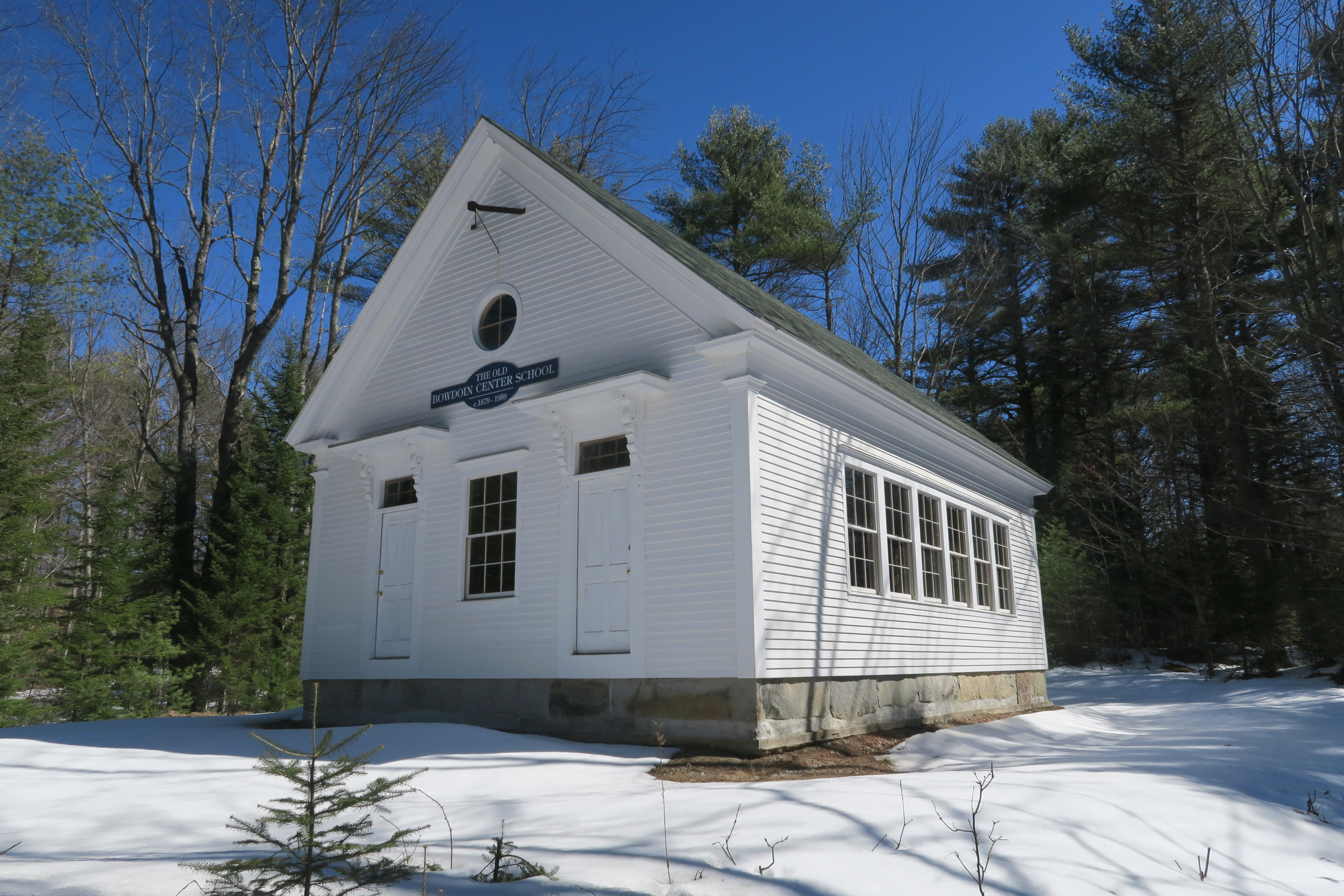
- The Old Bowdoin Center School

- Seal

- Location within Maine Location within the United States
- Coordinates: 44°02′53″N 69°58′26″W
- Country: United States
- State: Maine
- County: Sagadahoc
- Incorporated: 1788

Area
  - Total: 43.58 sq mi (112.87 km^{2})
  - Land: 43.46 sq mi (112.56 km^{2})
  - Water: 0.12 sq mi (0.31 km^{2})
- Elevation: 269 ft (82 m)

Population (2020)
  - Total: 3,136
  - Density: 27.9/sq mi (10.8/km^{2})
- Time zone: UTC-5 (Eastern (EST))
  - Summer (DST): UTC-4 (EDT)
- ZIP code: 04287
- Area code: 207
- FIPS code: 23-06260
- GNIS feature ID: 582360
- Website: bowdoinmaine.gov

Bowdoin is a town in Sagadahoc County, Maine, United States. Bowdoin is included in the Lewiston-Auburn, Maine metropolitan New England City and Town Area. The population was 3,136 at the 2020 census. Bowdoin is located 36 miles (58 km) north-northeast of Portland, and 28 miles (45 km) miles south-southwest of Augusta (Maine's state capital).

== History ==
Bowdoin was part of a tract of land extending from Merrymeeting Bay to the Androscoggin River that was conveyed in 1752 by the Kennebec Company to William Bowdoin of Boston, older brother of James Bowdoin. Originally called West Bowdoinham Plantation, it was settled some years before the Revolutionary War. In 1773, William Bowdoin died, and by 1779 James Bowdoin had legal claim to the area and was granting deeds. It contained about 121 families when the town was incorporated by the Massachusetts General Court on March 21, 1788, named after the Bowdoin family. In 1799, it ceded land to form Thompsonborough, whose name changed in 1802 to Lisbon. In 1834, it ceded more territory to Lisbon.

Bowdoin developed as an agricultural town, raising sheep and producing apples, wheat, hay and potatoes. Other industries included an ice company, sawmill, gristmill, carding mill and brickyard. Since 1993, alpacas have been raised in the town.

In 2023, four people were killed in a shooting and three more were injured. The same year, 18 people were shot dead in a shooting rampage in nearby Lewiston; the suspect's house was in Bowdoin, and was the scene of a massive police search.

== Geography ==
According to the United States Census Bureau, the town has a total area of 43.58 square miles (112.87 km^{2}), of which 43.46 square miles (112.56 km^{2}) is land and 0.12 square miles (0.31 km^{2}) is water. Bowdoin is drained by the Little River, Dead River, as well as the east and west streams of the Cathance River.

The town is served by U.S. Route 201 and State Routes 138 and 125. It borders the towns of Lisbon and Sabattus to the west, Litchfield to the north, Richmond and Bowdoinham to the east, and Topsham to the south.

== Demographics ==
Historical population
Census	Pop.	Note	%±
1790	984		—
1800	1,260		28.0%
1810	1,649		30.9%
1820	1,777		7.8%
1830	2,094		17.8%
1840	2,073		−1.0%
1850	1,857		−10.4%
1860	1,744		−6.1%
1870	1,345		−22.9%
1880	1,136		−15.5%
1890	940		−17.3%
1900	937		−0.3%
1910	814		−13.1%
1920	749		−8.0%
1930	568		−24.2%
1940	467		−17.8%
1950	638		36.6%
1960	668		4.7%
1970	858		28.4%
1980	1,629		89.9%
1990	2,207		35.5%
2000	2,727		23.6%
2010	3,061		12.2%
2020	3,136		2.5%
U.S. Decennial Census

=== 2010 census ===
As of the census of 2010, there were 3,061 people, 1,143 households, and 867 families living in the town. The population density was 70.4 inhabitants per square mile (27.2/km^{2}). There were 1,202 housing units at an average density of 27.7 per square mile (10.7/km^{2}). The racial makeup of the town was 96.9% White, 0.5% African American, 0.4% Native American, 0.5% Asian, 0.1% Pacific Islander, 0.2% from other races, and 1.4% from two or more races. Hispanic or Latino of any race were 0.5% of the population.

There were 1,143 households, of which 36.1% had children under the age of 18 living with them, 62.7% were married couples living together, 8.4% had a female householder with no husband present, 4.7% had a male householder with no wife present, and 24.1% were non-families. 18.0% of all households were made up of individuals, and 6% had someone living alone who was 65 years of age or older. The average household size was 2.67 and the average family size was 3.02.

The median age in the town was 40.4 years. 24% of residents were under the age of 18; 7.9% were between the ages of 18 and 24; 25% were from 25 to 44; 33.6% were from 45 to 64; and 9.4% were 65 years of age or older. The gender makeup of the town was 50.9% male and 49.1% female.

=== 2000 census ===
As of the census of 2000, there were 2,727 people, 987 households, and 765 families living in the town. The population density was 62.7 inhabitants per square mile (24.2/km^{2}). There were 1,035 housing units at an average density of 23.8 per square mile (9.2/km^{2}). The racial makeup of the town was 97.80% White, 0.26% African American, 0.11% Native American, 0.26% Asian, 0.07% Pacific Islander, 0.33% from other races, and 1.17% from two or more races. Hispanic or Latino of any race were 0.77% of the population.

There were 987 households, out of which 40.3% had children under the age of 18 living with them, 65.5% were married couples living together, 8.8% had a female householder with no husband present, and 22.4% were non-families. 16.4% of all households were made up of individuals, and 5.7% had someone living alone who was 65 years of age or older. The average household size was 2.76 and the average family size was 3.11.

In the town, the population was spread out, with 28.7% under the age of 18, 6.2% from 18 to 24, 35.1% from 25 to 44, 22.8% from 45 to 64, and 7.2% who were 65 years of age or older. The median age was 36 years. For every 100 females, there were 101.0 males. For every 100 females age 18 and over, there were 97.8 males.

The median income for a household in the town was $42,688, and the median income for a family was $46,094. Males had a median income of $32,975 versus $22,025 for females. The per capita income for the town was $17,260. About 7.9% of families and 8.6% of the population were below the poverty line, including 9.2% of those under age 18 and 3.1% of those age 65 or over.

== Education ==
Public schools in the area are operated by Maine School Administrative District 75. Students K-5 go to Bowdoin Central School, 6-8 go to Mt. Ararat Middle School, and 9-12 go to Mt. Ararat High School

== Notable people ==
- Robert Card, US army soldier and mass shooter gunman. He is known for being the perpetrator of the deadliest shooting in the history of Maine and one of the worst in the history of the United States.
- Mike McHugh, hockey left wing whose professional career was spent chiefly in the minor leagues, though he played twenty games in the NHL
