= Yarmouth (CDP), Maine =

Yarmouth, Maine
- Census-designated place
- Location in Cumberland County and the state of Maine
- Coordinates: 43°48′06″N 70°11′15″W
- Country: United States
- State: Maine
- County: Cumberland
- Town: Yarmouth

Area
  - Total: 5.35 sq mi (13.85 km^{2})
  - Land: 5.24 sq mi (13.58 km^{2})
  - Water: 0.10 sq mi (0.27 km^{2})
- Elevation: 72 ft (22 m)

Population (2020)
  - Total: 6,125
  - Density: 1,168.5/sq mi (451.16/km^{2})
- Time zone: UTC-5 (Eastern (EST))
  - Summer (DST): UTC-4 (EDT)
- ZIP code: 04096
- Area code: 207
- FIPS code: 23-87810
- GNIS feature ID: 2377973

Yarmouth is a census-designated place (CDP) in the town of Yarmouth in Cumberland County, Maine, United States. The population was 6,125 at the 2020 census. It is part of the Portland–South Portland–Biddeford, Maine Metropolitan Statistical Area.

== Geography ==
According to the United States Census Bureau, the CDP has a total area of 5.3 square miles (13.8 km^{2}), of which 5.3 square miles (13.6 km^{2}) is land and 0.12 square miles (0.3 km^{2}), or 2.10%, is water.

== Demographics ==
Historical population
Census	Pop.	Note	%±
2020	6,125		—
U.S. Decennial Census

As of the census of 2000, there were 3,560 people, 1,386 households, and 927 families residing in the CDP. The population density was 1,370.0 inhabitants per square mile (529.0/km^{2}). There were 1,433 housing units at an average density of 551.5 per square mile (212.9/km^{2}). The racial makeup of the CDP was 98.54% White, 0.42% Black or African American, 0.03% Native American, 0.37% Asian, 0.22% from other races, and 0.42% from two or more races. Hispanic or Latino of any race were 0.48% of the population.

There were 1,386 households, out of which 38.2% had children under the age of 18 living with them, 55.9% were married couples living together, 8.6% had a female householder with no husband present, and 33.1% were non-families. 28.3% of all households were made up of individuals, and 10.2% had someone living alone who was 65 years of age or older. The average household size was 2.49 and the average family size was 3.10.

In the CDP, the population was spread out, with 27.5% under the age of 18, 5.2% from 18 to 24, 27.3% from 25 to 44, 26.7% from 45 to 64, and 13.3% who were 65 years of age or older. The median age was 40 years. For every 100 females, there were 93.3 males. For every 100 females age 18 and over, there were 86.0 males.

The median income for a household in the CDP was $51,271, and the median income for a family was $69,766. Males had a median income of $48,272 versus $34,732 for females. The per capita income for the CDP was $29,599. About 3.5% of families and 4.5% of the population were below the poverty line, including 6.0% of those under age 18 and 8.7% of those age 65 or over.
