= Freeport, Maine (CDP) =

- Census-designated place
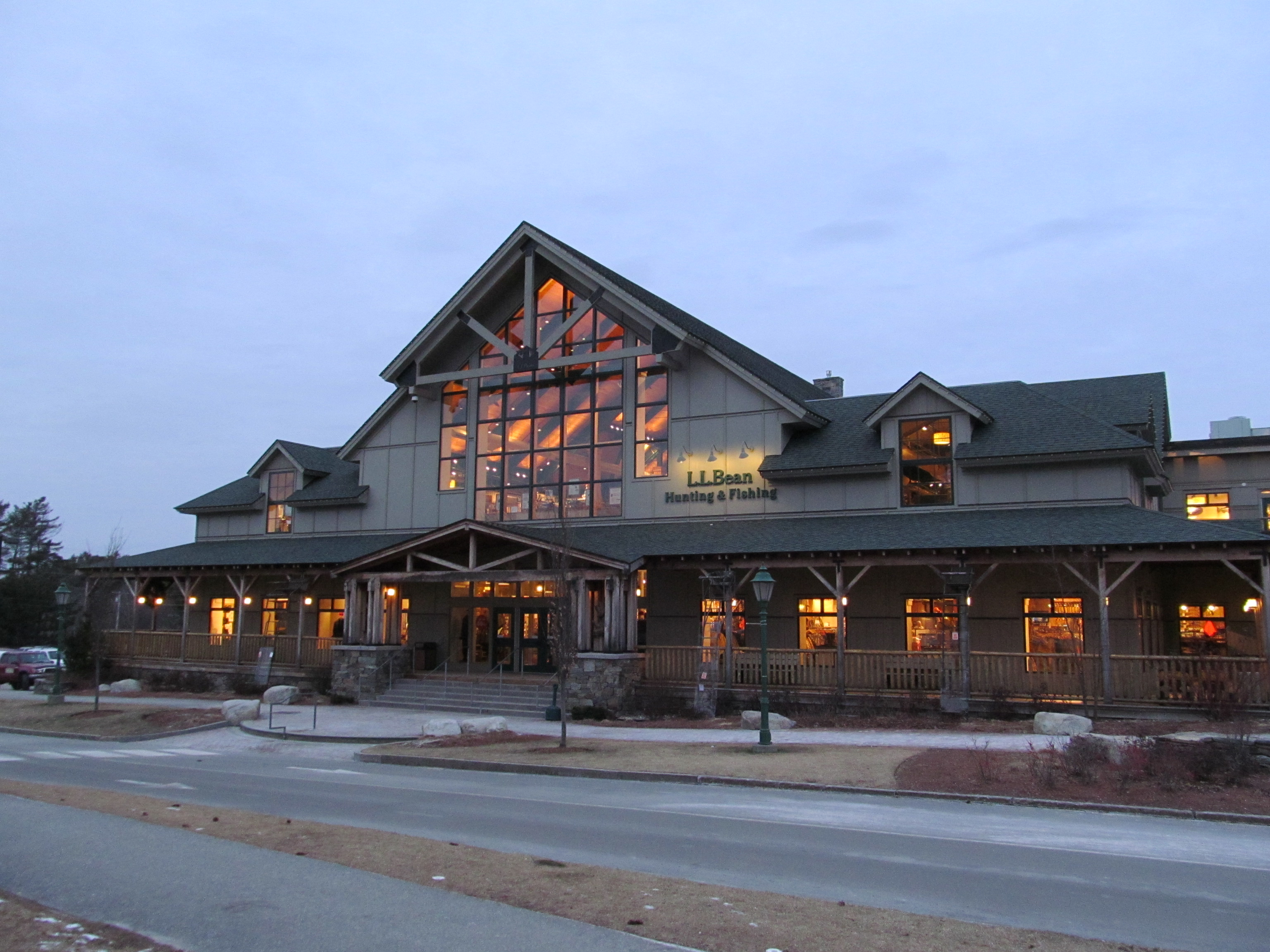
- L.L. Bean Hunting and Fishing Store

- Location in Cumberland County and the state of Maine
- Coordinates: 43°51′25″N 70°06′09″W
- Country: United States
- State: Maine
- County: Cumberland
- Town: Freeport

Area
  - Total: 1.71 sq mi (4.44 km^{2})
  - Land: 1.71 sq mi (4.44 km^{2})
  - Water: 0 sq mi (0.00 km^{2})
- Elevation: 157 ft (48 m)

Population (2020)
  - Total: 1,700
  - Density: 990.8/sq mi (382.56/km^{2})
- Time zone: UTC-5 (Eastern (EST))
  - Summer (DST): UTC-4 (EDT)
- ZIP codes: 04032-04034
- Area code: 207
- FIPS code: 23-26490
- GNIS feature ID: 2377912

Freeport is a census-designated place (CDP) in the town of Freeport in Cumberland County, Maine, United States. The population was 1,485 at the 2010 census. It is part of the Portland–South Portland–Biddeford, Maine Metropolitan Statistical Area.

== Geography ==
According to the United States Census Bureau, the CDP has a total area of 1.7 square miles (4.4 km^{2}), all land.

== Demographics ==
Historical population
Census	Pop.	Note	%±
2020	1,700		—
U.S. Decennial Census

As of the census of 2000, there were 1,813 people, 804 households, and 463 families residing in the CDP. The population density was 706.1 inhabitants per square mile (272.6/km^{2}). There were 854 housing units at an average density of 332.6 per square mile (128.4/km^{2}). The racial makeup of the CDP was 94.04% White, 0.94% Black or African American, 0.50% Native American, 2.81% Asian, 0.06% Pacific Islander, 0.55% from other races, and 1.10% from two or more races. Hispanic or Latino of any race were 0.88% of the population.

There were 804 households, out of which 28.6% had children under the age of 18 living with them, 38.3% were married couples living together, 15.5% had a female householder with no husband present, and 42.4% were non-families. 34.3% of all households were made up of individuals, and 12.1% had someone living alone who was 65 years of age or older. The average household size was 2.15 and the average family size was 2.75.

In the CDP, the population was spread out, with 22.1% under the age of 18, 6.9% from 18 to 24, 31.3% from 25 to 44, 23.9% from 45 to 64, and 15.7% who were 65 years of age or older. The median age was 39 years. For every 100 females, there were 80.9 males. For every 100 females age 18 and over, there were 76.3 males.

The median income for a household in the CDP was $34,591, and the median income for a family was $51,406. Males had a median income of $36,728 versus $27,813 for females. The per capita income for the CDP was $22,805. About 11.1% of families and 16.1% of the population were below the poverty line, including 31.5% of those under age 18 and 18.9% of those age 65 or over.
