= Topsham (CDP), Maine =

Topsham, Maine
- Census-designated place
- Location within Maine Location within the United States
- Coordinates: 43°56′26″N 69°56′09″W
- Country: United States
- State: Maine
- County: Sagadahoc

Area
  - Total: 11.37 sq mi (29.45 km^{2})
  - Land: 11.02 sq mi (28.55 km^{2})
  - Water: 0.35 sq mi (0.90 km^{2})
- Elevation: 75 ft (23 m)

Population (2020)
  - Total: 6,623
  - Density: 600.7/sq mi (231.94/km^{2})
- Time zone: UTC-5 (Eastern (EST))
  - Summer (DST): UTC-4 (EDT)
- ZIP code: 04086
- Area code: 207
- FIPS code: 23-76925
- GNIS feature ID: 2377962

Topsham is a census-designated place (CDP) in the town of Topsham in Sagadahoc County, Maine, United States. The population was 6,271 at the 2000 census. It is part of the Portland–South Portland–Biddeford, Maine Metropolitan Statistical Area.

== Geography ==
According to the United States Census Bureau, the CDP has a total area of 11.2 square miles (29.0 km^{2}), of which 11.0 square miles (28.5 km^{2}) is land and 0.2 square mile (0.4 km^{2}) (1.43%) is water.

== Demographics ==
Historical population
Census	Pop.	Note	%±
2020	6,623		—
U.S. Decennial Census

As of the census of 2000, there were 6,271 people, 2,375 households, and 1,681 families residing in the CDP. The population density was 568.9 inhabitants per square mile (219.7/km^{2}). There were 2,486 housing units at an average density of 225.5 per square mile (87.1/km^{2}). The racial makeup of the CDP was 94.45% White, 1.80% Black or African American, 0.21% Native American, 1.48% Asian, 0.08% Pacific Islander, 0.45% from other races, and 1.53% from two or more races. Hispanic or Latino of any race were 1.58% of the population.

There were 2,375 households, out of which 37.9% had children under the age of 18 living with them, 58.8% were married couples living together, 9.1% had a female householder with no husband present, and 29.2% were non-families. 24.1% of all households were made up of individuals, and 10.7% had someone living alone who was 65 years of age or older. The average household size was 2.59 and the average family size was 3.08.

In the CDP, the population was spread out, with 28.1% under the age of 18, 5.7% from 18 to 24, 32.5% from 25 to 44, 20.3% from 45 to 64, and 13.5% who were 65 years of age or older. The median age was 36 years. For every 100 females, there were 91.8 males. For every 100 females age 18 and over, there were 84.6 males.

The median income for a household in the CDP was $45,634, and the median income for a family was $53,077. Males had a median income of $36,011 versus $30,198 for females. The per capita income for the CDP was $19,995. About 2.3% of families and 3.5% of the population were below the poverty line, including 3.6% of those under age 18 and none of those age 65 or over.
