= Richmond, Maine =

Town in Maine, United States

- Town
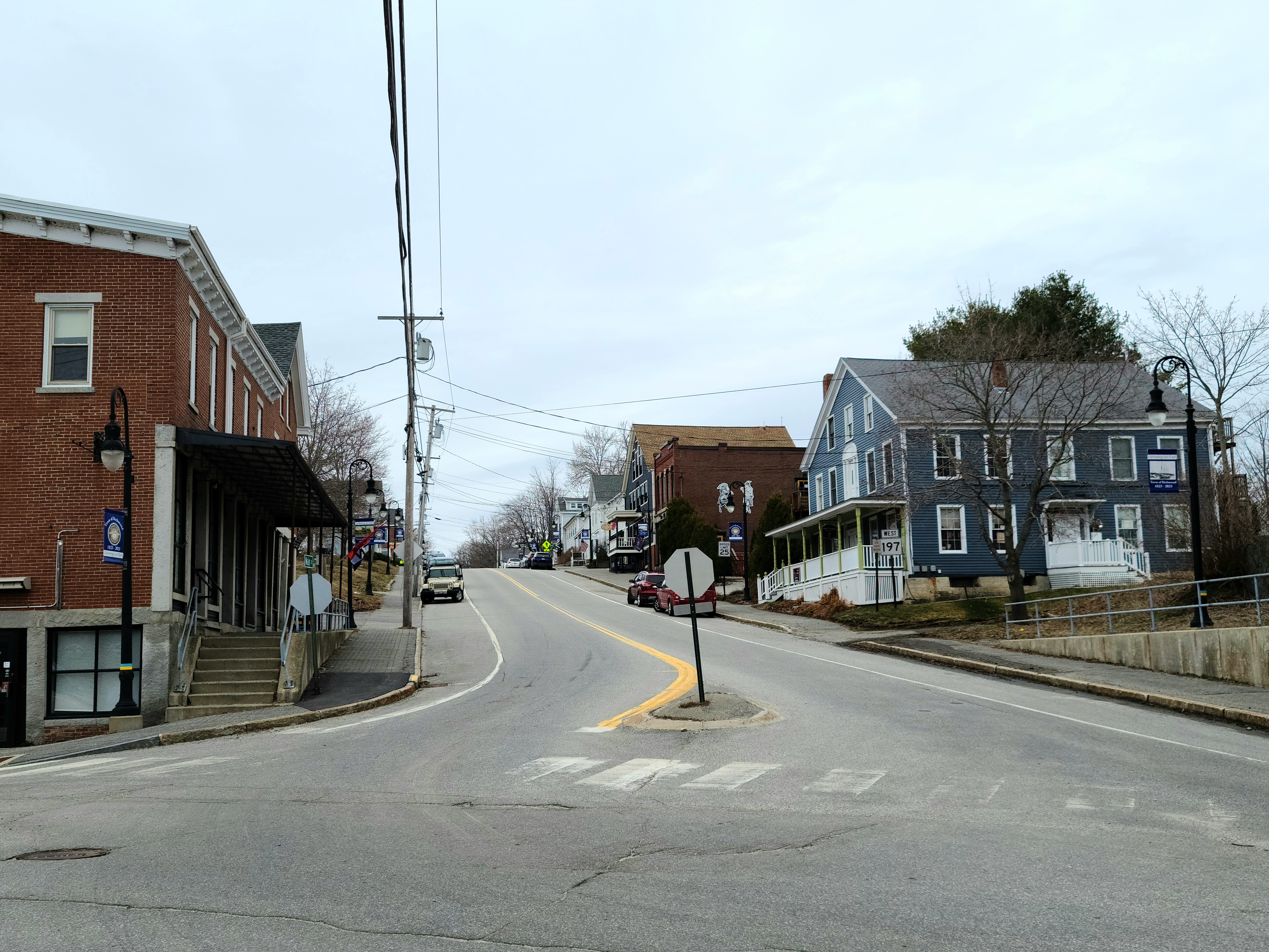
- Main Street

- Seal

- Location within Maine Location within the United States
- Coordinates: 44°07′31″N 69°52′16″W
- Country: United States
- State: Maine
- County: Sagadahoc
- Incorporated: 1823
- Named for: Fort Richmond

Area
  - Total: 31.56 sq mi (81.74 km^{2})
  - Land: 30.41 sq mi (78.76 km^{2})
  - Water: 1.15 sq mi (2.98 km^{2})
- Elevation: 259 ft (79 m)

Population (2020)
  - Total: 3,522
  - Density: 116/sq mi (44.7/km^{2})
- Time zone: UTC-5 (Eastern (EST))
  - Summer (DST): UTC-4 (EDT)
- ZIP code: 04357
- Area code: 207
- FIPS code: 23-62645
- GNIS feature ID: 582695
- Website: www.richmondmaine.com

Richmond is a town in Sagadahoc County, Maine, United States. The population was 3,522 at the 2020 census. The town contains the census-designated place of the same name. It is part of the Portland-South Portland-Biddeford metropolitan area, situated at the head of Merrymeeting Bay.

Richmond is located adjacent to the 2,019 acre state-owned and managed Steve Powell Wildlife Management Area on Swan Island, a wildlife sanctuary and tourist area listed on the National Register of Historic Places. Swan Island is a major wildlife tourist attraction for the town, especially during the summer.

Richmond is also known for its collection of Greek Revival homes, unique for the area.

== History ==
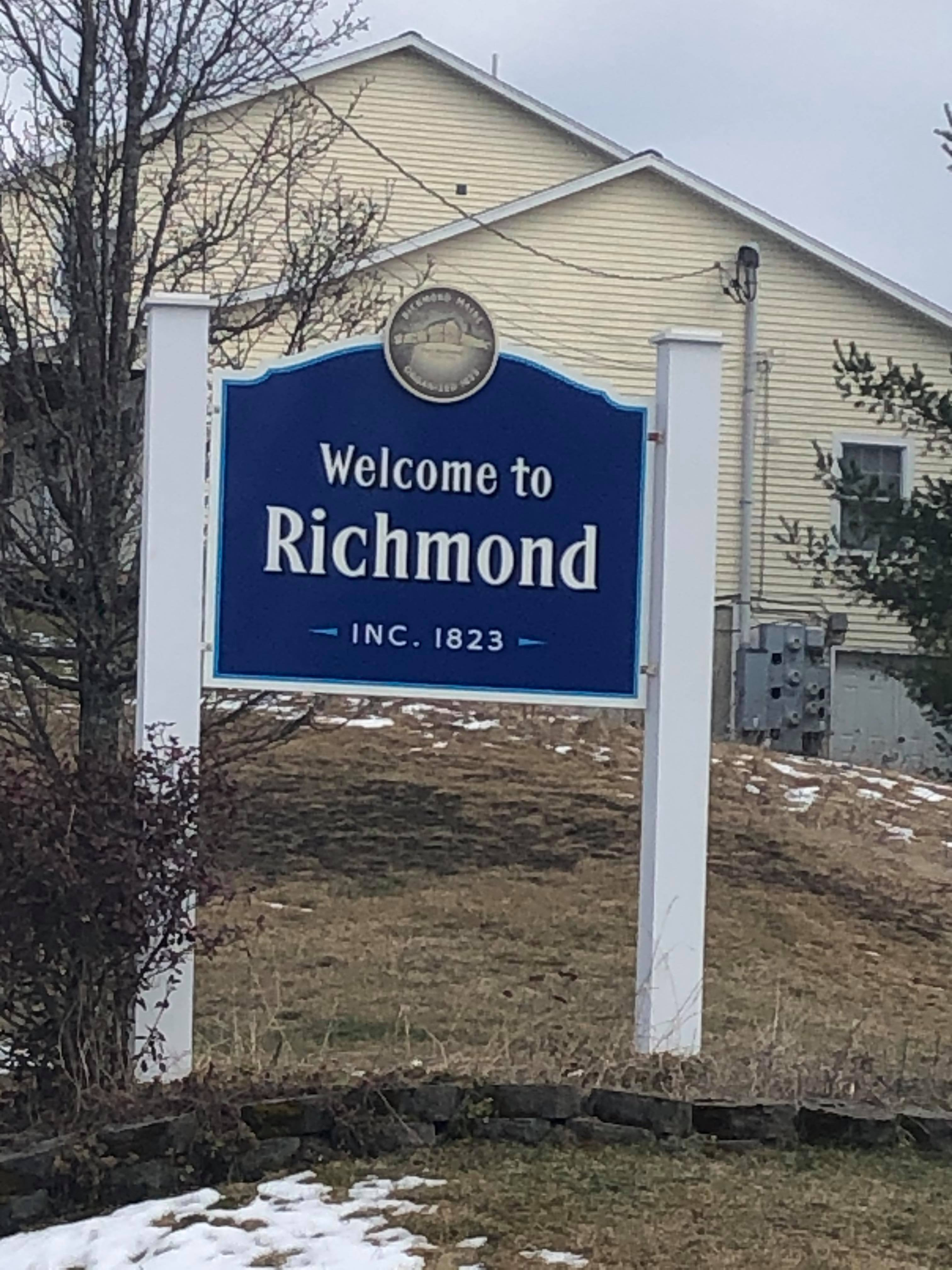
Richmond Welcome Sign, State Route 197

The tract of land that comprises Richmond and Gardiner was purchased in 1649 from the Abenaki Indians by Christopher Lawson. The site of Richmond, as well as neighboring Swan Island, is believed by historians to have served as a summer settlement for the Abenaki.

In 1719, Fort Richmond was built by the Province of Massachusetts Bay on the western bank of the Kennebec River, where Richmond is located today. Named for Ludovic Stewart, 1st Duke of Richmond, the fort included a blockhouse, trading post, chapel, and officers' and soldiers' quarters, all surrounded by a palisade. In 1722 during the Dummer's War, following the battle at Arrowsic, Maine, Fort Richmond was attacked in a three-hour siege by warriors from Norridgewock. Houses were burned and cattle slain, but the fort held. Brunswick and other settlements near the mouth of the Kennebec River were destroyed. The fort's defenses were enlarged in 1723. On August 19, 1724, a militia of 208 soldiers departed Fort Richmond under command of captains Jeremiah Moulton and Johnson Harmon, traveling up the Kennebec in 17 whaleboats to sack Norridgewock. Fort Richmond would be rebuilt in 1740, attacked by another tribe in 1750, then dismantled in 1755 when forts Shirley (also called Frankfort), Western and Halifax were built upriver.

Settled in 1725, the community was part of Bowdoinham when it was incorporated in 1762 by the Massachusetts General Court. In 1790, Revolutionary War veteran John Plummer was awarded a land grant on Plummer Road, where his son built the surviving house about 1810. The Embargo of 1807 crippled the port's economy, bankrupted merchants, and created a recession that lingered through the War of 1812.

The town was set off and incorporated on February 10, 1823, taking its name from the old fort. Farms produced hay and potatoes. With the arrival of steamboats in the 1830s, Richmond boomed as a shipbuilding and trade center on the navigable Kennebec River estuary. Among the more important shipbuilders were T. J. Southard, also considered one of the town's "founding fathers". A brass foundry was established. The community also produced shoes, sails and wood products. Its peak years were between 1835 and 1857, endowing the town with a wealth of fine Greek Revival architecture.

Richmond is believed to have been a site along the Underground Railroad.

Richmond was once the center of the largest Slavic-speaking settlement in the United States. People of Ukrainian, Russian, and Polish heritage emigrated to the United States during World War II to settle along the Kennebec Valley. In the 1950s and 1960s, there was also a large influx of White Russian emigres, who earlier fled the Bolshevik Revolution of 1917.

== Geography ==
According to the United States Census Bureau, the town has a total area of 31.56 square miles (81.74 km^{2}), of which 30.41 square miles (78.76 km^{2}) is land and 1.15 square miles (2.98 km^{2}) is water. Richmond is drained by Mill Brook, Abagadasset River and Kennebec River. Peacock Beach State Park, established in May 2010, is a state park located on Pleasant Pond in Richmond.

== Demographics ==
Historical population
Census	Pop.	Note	%±
1830	1,308		—
1840	1,604		22.6%
1850	2,056		28.2%
1860	2,739		33.2%
1870	2,442		−10.8%
1880	2,658		8.8%
1890	3,082		16.0%
1900	2,049		−33.5%
1910	1,858		−9.3%
1920	1,724		−7.2%
1930	1,964		13.9%
1940	2,063		5.0%
1950	2,217		7.5%
1960	2,185		−1.4%
1970	2,168		−0.8%
1980	2,627		21.2%
1990	3,072		16.9%
2000	3,298		7.4%
2010	3,411		3.4%
2020	3,522		3.3%
U.S. Decennial Census

=== 2010 census ===
As of the census of 2010, there were 3,411 people, 1,420 households, and 965 families residing in the town. The population density was 112.2 inhabitants per square mile (43.3/km^{2}). There were 1,629 housing units at an average density of 53.6 units per square mile (20.7 units/km^{2}). The racial makeup of the town was 97.3% White, 0.4% African American, 0.3% Native American, 0.2% Asian, 0.3% from other races, and 1.5% from two or more races. Hispanic or Latino of any race were 0.9% of the population.

There were 1,420 households, of which 29.6% had children under the age of 18 living with them, 52.5% were married couples living together, 11.3% had a female householder with no husband present, 4.2% had a male householder with no wife present, and 32.0% were non-families. 24.9% of all households were made up of individuals, and 6.8% had someone living alone who was 65 years of age or older. The average household size was 2.39 and the average family size was 2.85.

The median age in the town was 42.1 years. 22% of residents were under the age of 18; 6.4% were between the ages of 18 and 24; 25.7% were from 25 to 44; 31.9% were from 45 to 64; and 14% were 65 years of age or older. The gender makeup of the town was 49.0% male and 51.0% female.

=== 2000 census ===
At the 2000 census, there were 3,298 people, 1,290 households and 900 families residing in the town. The population density was 108.5 inhabitants per square mile (41.9/km^{2}). There were 1,475 housing units at an average density of 18.7 persons per square kilometre (48 persons/mi^{2}). The racial makeup of the town was 98.18% White, 0.42% African American, 0.18% Native American, 0.24% Asian, 0.06% Pacific Islander, 0.36% from other races, and 0.55% from two or more races. 0.85% of the population were Hispanic or Latino of any race.

There were 1,290 households, of which 36.0% had children under the age of 18 living with them, 53.8% were married couples living together, 11.1% have a woman whose husband does not live with her, and 30.2% were non-families. 24.2% of all households were made up of individuals, and 8.3% had someone living alone who was 65 years of age or older. The average household size was 2.54 and the average family size was 3.01.

Age distribution was 27.3% under the age of 18, 6.2% from 18 to 24, 30.7% from 25 to 44, 25.3% from 45 to 64, and 10.5% who were 65 years of age or older. The median age was 37 years. For every 100 females, there were 97.5 males. For every 100 females age 18 and over, there were 95.4 males.

The median household income was $36,654, and the median family income was $48,125. Males had a median income of $30,557 versus $25,844 for females. The per capita income for the town was $17,896. 13.6% of the population and 14.0% of families were below the poverty line. Out of the total people living in poverty, 22.7% are under the age of 18 and 6.1% are 65 or older.

== Sites of interest ==
- Richmond Historical & Cultural Society
- C. H. T. J. Southard House Museum built about 1870 and remodeled in 1886

== Education ==
It is in Regional School Unit 2, a.k.a. Kennebec Intra-District Schools.

== Gallery ==
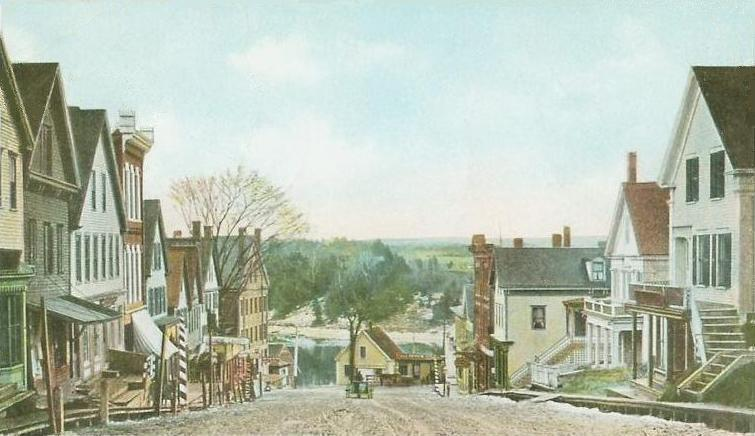
Main Street in 1908

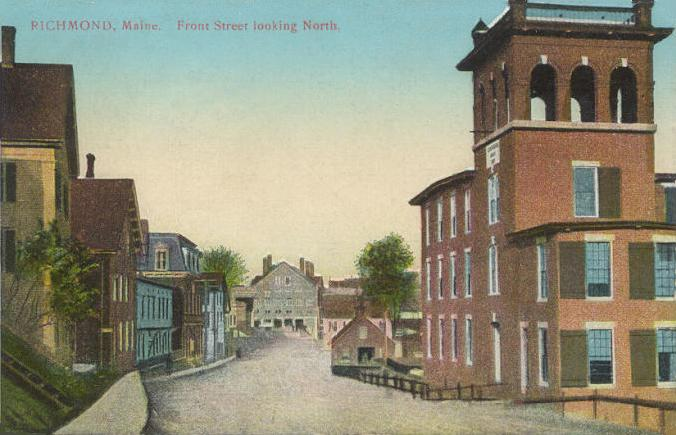
Front Street c. 1910

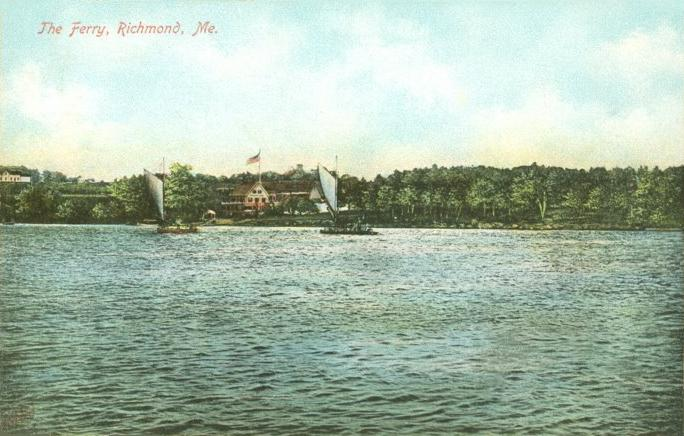
Swan Island ferry c. 1908

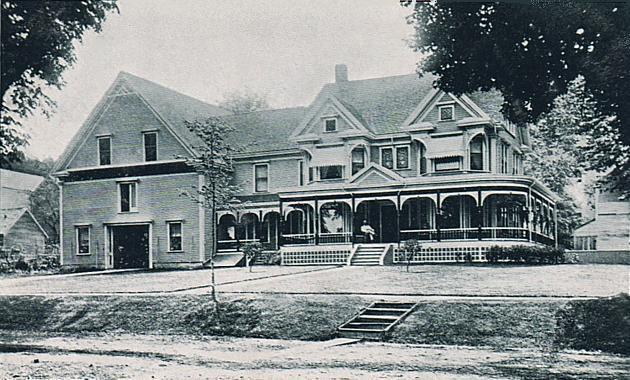
Maxwell residence in 1907

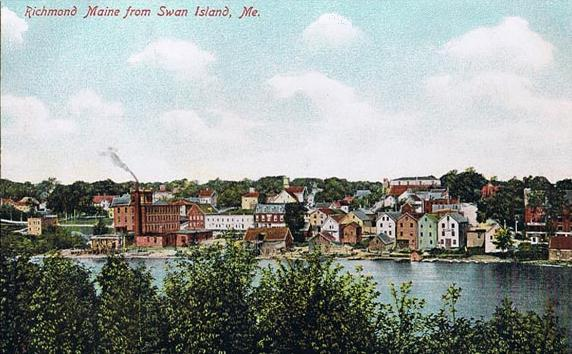
Richmond as seen from Swan Island, 1908

== Notable people ==
- De Alva S. Alexander, journalist, lawyer, US congressman
- Walter A. Burleigh, physician, US congressman
- Andrey Dikiy, historian, writer
- Seth Goodall, Maine state senator
- George Hamilton-Gordon, Scottish earl, sailor
- T. J. Southard, shipbuilder, politician, philanthropist, and a Richmond "founding father"
