= Richmond (CDP), Maine =

Richmond, Maine
- Census-designated place
- Location within Maine Location within the United States
- Coordinates: 44°06′42″N 69°49′23″W
- Country: United States
- State: Maine
- County: Sagadahoc

Area
  - Total: 7.22 sq mi (18.69 km^{2})
  - Land: 7.13 sq mi (18.46 km^{2})
  - Water: 0.089 sq mi (0.23 km^{2})
- Elevation: 121 ft (37 m)

Population (2020)
  - Total: 1,810
  - Density: 253.9/sq mi (98.05/km^{2})
- Time zone: UTC-5 (Eastern (EST))
  - Summer (DST): UTC-4 (EDT)
- ZIP Code: 04357
- Area code: 207
- FIPS code: 23-62610
- GNIS feature ID: 2377951

Richmond is a census-designated place (CDP) in the town of Richmond in Sagadahoc County, Maine, United States. The population was 1,864 at the 2000 census. It is part of the Portland–South Portland–Biddeford, Maine Metropolitan Statistical Area.

== Geography ==
According to the United States Census Bureau, the CDP has a total area of 7.1 square miles (18.4 km^{2}), all land.

== Demographics ==
Historical population
Census	Pop.	Note	%±
2020	1,810		—
U.S. Decennial Census

As of the census of 2000, there were 1,864 people, 759 households, and 494 families residing in the CDP. The population density was 262.7 inhabitants per square mile (101.4/km^{2}). There were 840 housing units at an average density of 45.7 persons/km^{2} (118.4 persons/sq mi). The racial makeup of the CDP was 97.80% White, 0.59% African American, 0.16% Native American, 0.21% Asian, 0.11% Pacific Islander, 0.32% from other races, and 0.80% from two or more races. Hispanic or Latino of any race were 0.86% of the population.

There were 759 households, out of which 35.3% had children under the age of 18 living with them, 47.3% were married couples living together, 13.3% had a female householder with no husband present, and 34.9% were non-families. 28.7% of all households were made up of individuals, and 10.3% had someone living alone who was 65 years of age or older. The average household size was 2.43 and the average family size was 3.00.

In the CDP, the population was spread out, with 26.7% under the age of 18, 6.3% from 18 to 24, 29.6% from 25 to 44, 25.8% from 45 to 64, and 11.6% who were 65 years of age or older. The median age was 38 years. For every 100 females, there were 93.2 males. For every 100 females age 18 and over, there were 87.9 males.

The median income for a household in the CDP was $33,750, and the median income for a family was $45,114. Males had a median income of $30,362 versus $26,161 for females. The per capita income for the CDP was $15,867. About 18.1% of families and 16.1% of the population were below the poverty line, including 24.3% of those under the age of 18 and 3.2% ages 65 or older.

== Education ==
It is in Regional School Unit 2, a.k.a. Kennebec Intra-District Schools.
