= Brunswick (CDP), Maine =

Brunswick, Maine
- Census-designated place
- Location in Cumberland County and the state of Maine
- Coordinates: 43°54′10″N 69°56′30″W
- Country: United States
- State: Maine
- County: Cumberland
- Town: Brunswick

Area
  - Total: 21.02 sq mi (54.43 km^{2})
  - Land: 19.44 sq mi (50.34 km^{2})
  - Water: 1.58 sq mi (4.09 km^{2})
- Elevation: 69 ft (21 m)

Population (2020)
  - Total: 17,033
  - Density: 876.3/sq mi (338.34/km^{2})
- Time zone: UTC-5 (Eastern (EST))
  - Summer (DST): UTC-4 (EDT)
- ZIP Code: 04011
- Area code: 207
- FIPS code: 23-08395
- GNIS feature ID: 2377893

Brunswick is a census-designated place (CDP) in the town of Brunswick in Cumberland County, Maine, United States. The population was 15,175 at the 2010 census. It is part of the Portland–South Portland–Biddeford, Maine Metropolitan Statistical Area.

== Geography ==
According to the United States Census Bureau, the CDP has a total area of 16.1 square miles (41.6 km^{2}), of which 14.5 square miles (37.6 km^{2}) is land and 1.5 square miles (4.0 km^{2}), or 9.65%, is water.

== Demographics ==
Historical population
| Census | Pop. | Note | %± |
|---|---|---|---|
| 2020 | 17,033 | | — |
U.S. Decennial Census

As of the census of 2000, there were 14,816 people, 5,880 households, and 3,433 families residing in the CDP. The population density was 1,177.8 inhabitants per square mile (454.8/km^{2}). There were 6,192 housing units at an average density of 492.2 per square mile (190.0/km^{2}). The racial makeup of the CDP was 95.19% White, 0.99% Black or African American, 0.16% Native American, 1.90% Asian, 0.04% Pacific Islander, 0.45% from other races, and 1.26% from two or more races. Hispanic or Latino of any race were 1.31% of the population.

There were 5,880 households, out of which 28.1% had children under the age of 18 living with them, 47.0% were married couples living together, 8.4% had a female householder with no husband present, and 41.6% were non-families. 35.3% of all households were made up of individuals, and 16.0% had someone living alone who was 65 years of age or older. The average household size was 2.24 and the average family size was 2.92.

In the CDP, the population was spread out, with 21.5% under the age of 18, 15.6% from 18 to 24, 25.3% from 25 to 44, 20.2% from 45 to 64, and 17.5% who were 65 years of age or older. The median age was 36 years. For every 100 females, there were 89.7 males. For every 100 females age 18 and over, there were 85.0 males.

The median income for a household in the CDP was $38,036, and the median income for a family was $47,134. Males had a median income of $32,088 versus $25,762 for females. The per capita income for the CDP was $19,494. About 5.7% of families and 9.7% of the population were below the poverty line, including 9.9% of those under age 18 and 9.6% of those age 65 or over.
