= Sagadahoc County, Maine =

County in Maine, United States

- County
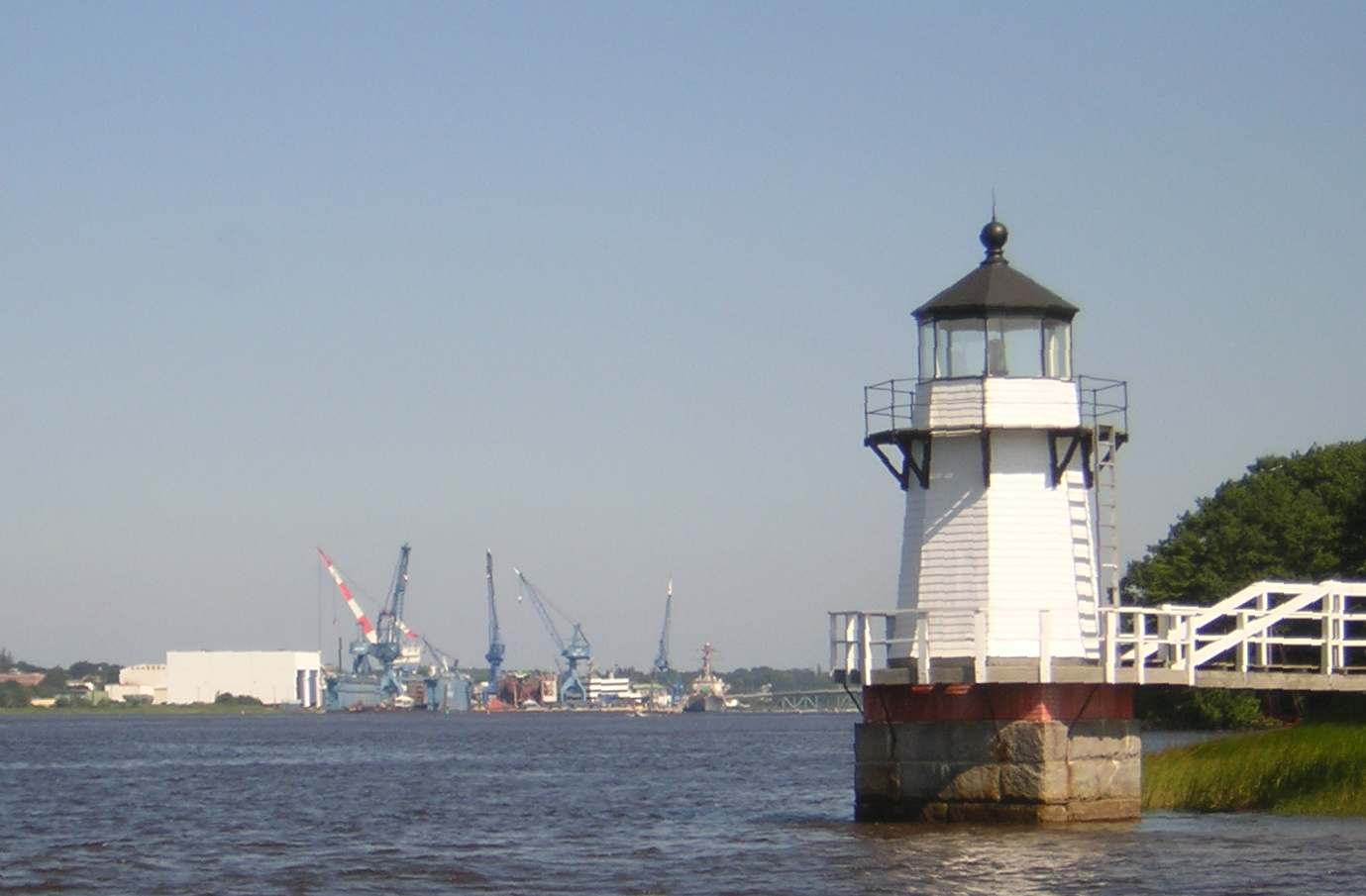
- Doubling Point Light and Bath Iron Works

- Seal

- Location within the U.S. state of Maine
- Coordinates: 43°56′58″N 69°51′26″W
- Country: United States
- State: Maine
- Founded: February 14, 1854
- Named for: Abenaki word meaning "mouth of the big river;" a former name for the Kennebec River
- Seat: Bath
- Largest city: Topsham

Area
  - Total: 370 sq mi (960 km^{2})
  - Land: 254 sq mi (660 km^{2})
  - Water: 116 sq mi (300 km^{2}) 31%

Population (2020)
  - Total: 36,699
  - Estimate (2025): 37,979 ▲
  - Density: 144/sq mi (55.8/km^{2})
- Time zone: UTC−5 (Eastern)
  - Summer (DST): UTC−4 (EDT)
- Congressional district: 1st
- Website: sagadahoccountyme.gov

Sagadahoc County (/ˈsæɡədəhɒk/ SAG-ə-də-hok) is a county located in the U.S. state of Maine. As of the 2020 census, the population was 36,699. Its county seat is Bath. It is the smallest county in Maine by area.

Sagadahoc County is part of the Portland–South Portland, ME Metropolitan Statistical Area.

== History ==
=== Exploration and settlement ===
Sagadahoc County was initially part of York and, later, Lincoln County before being set off and incorporated in 1854. The name comes from the "Sagadahoc River", an early name for the Kennebec River. Samuel de Champlain led the first known visit of Europeans to the region. In 1607, the English Popham Colony was established in what is now Phippsburg; it was abandoned a year later, but English fishermen and trappers continued to visit the area. John Smith explored the region in 1614 and reported back to King Charles I, who named the Sagadahoc area "Leethe."

When the Plymouth Council for New England was dissolved in 1635, 10,000 acres (40 km^{2}) on the east side of the Kennebec River were divided up and granted to private owners. Over the years, these proprietors extended their claims through additional land grants, purchases from Native Americans, and exploitation of the often poorly defined boundaries of their lands. By 1660, Englishmen held the titles to the whole of what is now Sagadahoc County.

When King Philip’s War broke out in 1675, the plundering of one house was the only hostile act in Sagadahoc County until August 1676, at which point three settlements were attacked and 53 people taken captive by Native Americans. The region was almost totally abandoned by settlers, and no permanent settlement was established until 1715, when Arrowsic and Brunswick were founded. Scotch-Irish Presbyterians began immigrating to the region in increasingly large numbers, though occasional violence persisted until 1759, when the French and Indian Wars ended in Maine.

=== Later conflicts ===
There were no significant conflicts in Sagadahoc during the American Revolutionary War, despite fear of attack from British cruisers. Two British armed vessels sailed up the Kennebec River toward Bath, but turned back after being attacked. In the War of 1812, the capture of HMS Boxer occurred nearby. During the Civil War the county furnished to the Union forces 2,488 men.

=== Nineteenth century ===
Steam power was first used on the Kennebec as early as 1818 for propelling boats. What became the Bath branch of the Maine Central Railroad was completed in 1849; and the Knox and Lincoln Railroad was opened in 1871. The first newspaper was published in the county in 1820.

Sagadahoc County was set off from Lincoln and incorporated in 1854, with Bath as the county seat. Its valuation in 1870 was $11,041,340. In 1880 it was $10,297,215. The polls in 1870 numbered 4,669, and in 1880, 5,182. The population in 1870 was 18,803. In 1880 it was 19,276.

From 1880 to 2000, the county's population nearly doubled to 35,214.

== Geography ==
According to the U.S. Census Bureau, the county has a total area of 370 square miles (960 km^{2}), of which 254 square miles (660 km^{2}) is land and 116 square miles (300 km^{2}) (31%) is water. It is the smallest county in Maine by area.

=== Adjacent counties ===
- Kennebec County – north
- Lincoln County – east
- Cumberland County – west
- Androscoggin County – northwest

=== National protected area ===
- Pond Island National Wildlife Refuge

== Demographics ==
Historical population
Census	Pop.	Note	%±
1860	21,790		—
1870	18,803		−13.7%
1880	19,272		2.5%
1890	19,452		0.9%
1900	20,330		4.5%
1910	18,574		−8.6%
1920	23,021		23.9%
1930	16,927		−26.5%
1940	19,123		13.0%
1950	20,911		9.3%
1960	22,793		9.0%
1970	23,452		2.9%
1980	28,795		22.8%
1990	33,535		16.5%
2000	35,214		5.0%
2010	35,293		0.2%
2020	36,699		4.0%
2025 (est.)	37,979	▲	3.5%
U.S. Decennial Census; 1790-1960 1900-1990; 1990-2000 2010-2016

=== 2020 census ===
As of the 2020 census, the county had a population of 36,699. Of the residents, 18.4% were under the age of 18 and 23.7% were 65 years of age or older; the median age was 47.4 years. For every 100 females there were 95.7 males, and for every 100 females age 18 and over there were 93.7 males. 38.6% of residents lived in urban areas and 61.4% lived in rural areas.

The racial makeup of the county was 92.8% White, 0.9% Black or African American, 0.3% American Indian and Alaska Native, 0.7% Asian, 0.0% Native Hawaiian and Pacific Islander, 0.5% from some other race, and 4.8% from two or more races. Hispanic or Latino residents of any race comprised 1.8% of the population.

There were 16,136 households in the county, of which 24.6% had children under the age of 18 living with them and 24.7% had a female householder with no spouse or partner present. About 29.2% of all households were made up of individuals and 13.7% had someone living alone who was 65 years of age or older.

There were 18,938 housing units, of which 14.8% were vacant. Among occupied housing units, 75.2% were owner-occupied and 24.8% were renter-occupied. The homeowner vacancy rate was 1.1% and the rental vacancy rate was 5.8%.

Sagadahoc County, Maine – Racial and ethnic composition Note: the US Census treats Hispanic/Latino as an ethnic category. This table excludes Latinos from the racial categories and assigns them to a separate category. Hispanics/Latinos may be of any race.
Race / Ethnicity (NH = Non-Hispanic)	Pop 2000	Pop 2010	Pop 2020	% 2000	% 2010	% 2020
White alone (NH)	33,762	33,663	33,830	95.87%	95.38%	92.18%
Black or African American alone (NH)	307	237	295	0.87%	0.67%	0.80%
Native American or Alaska Native alone (NH)	98	115	92	0.27%	0.32%	0.25%
Asian alone (NH)	218	258	247	0.61%	0.73%	0.67%
Pacific Islander alone (NH)	15	5	3	0.04%	0.01%	0.00%
Other race alone (NH)	29	36	116	0.08%	0.10%	0.31%
Mixed race or Multiracial (NH)	394	526	1,467	1.11%	1.49%	3.99%
Hispanic or Latino (any race)	391	453	649	1.11%	1.28%	1.76%
Total	35,214	35,293	36,699	100.00%	100.00%	100.00%

=== 2010 census ===
As of the 2010 United States census, there were 35,293 people, 15,088 households, and 9,869 families living in the county. The population density was 139.1 inhabitants per square mile (53.7/km^{2}). There were 18,288 housing units at an average density of 72.1 per square mile (27.8/km^{2}). The racial makeup of the county was 96.2% white, 0.8% Asian, 0.7% black or African American, 0.4% American Indian, 0.3% from other races, and 1.6% from two or more races. Those of Hispanic or Latino origin made up 1.3% of the population. In terms of ancestry, 26.9% were English, 16.8% were Irish, 11.8% were German, 8.1% were French Canadian, 6.6% were Italian, 6.5% were Scottish, and 6.4% were American.

Of the 15,088 households, 28.4% had children under the age of 18 living with them, 51.2% were married couples living together, 10.1% had a female householder with no husband present, 34.6% were non-families, and 27.1% of all households were made up of individuals. The average household size was 2.32 and the average family size was 2.81. The median age was 44.1 years.

The median income for a household in the county was $55,486 and the median income for a family was $66,650. Males had a median income of $46,068 versus $35,107 for females. The per capita income for the county was $26,983. About 5.7% of families and 8.8% of the population were below the poverty line, including 12.0% of those under age 18 and 7.4% of those age 65 or over.

=== 2000 census ===
As of the census of 2000, there were 35,214 people, 14,117 households, and 9,641 families living in the county. The population density was 139 inhabitants per square mile (54/km^{2}). There were 16,489 housing units at an average density of 65 per square mile (25/km^{2}). The racial makeup of the county was 96.49% White, 0.92% Black or African American, 0.31% Native American, 0.63% Asian, 0.06% Pacific Islander, 0.38% from other races, and 1.21% from two or more races. 1.11% of the population were Hispanic or Latino of any race.

There were 14,117 households, out of which 33.20% had children under the age of 18 living with them, 54.60% were married couples living together, 9.60% had a female householder with no husband present, and 31.70% were non-families. 25.20% of all households were made up of individuals, and 9.30% had someone living alone who was 65 years of age or older. The average household size was 2.47 and the average family size was 2.96.

In the county, the population was spread out, with 25.80% under the age of 18, 6.60% from 18 to 24, 30.50% from 25 to 44, 24.90% from 45 to 64, and 12.30% who were 65 years of age or older. The median age was 38 years. For every 100 females, there were 96.30 males. For every 100 females age 18 and over, there were 93.10 males.

The median income for a household in the county was $41,908, and the median income for a family was $49,714. Males had a median income of $34,039 versus $24,689 for females. The per capita income for the county was $20,378. About 6.90% of families and 8.60% of the population were below the poverty line, including 12.20% of those under age 18 and 6.40% of those age 65 or over.

22.0% were of English, 11.6% Irish, 11.1% French, 10.6% United States or American, 8.0% French Canadian and 7.3% German ancestry according to Census 2000. 96.1% spoke English and 2.2% French as their first language.

According to the Maine Center for Disease Control and Prevention, Sagadahoc County has the lowest rate of immunization of two-year-olds in the state, at 26%, only a third of the statewide average of 75% and more than 30% lower than the next lowest county in the state.

== Politics ==
=== State senators representing Sagadahoc County ===
- Senator Pamela Cahill, R-Woolwich, 1986–1994
- Senator Mary Small, R-Bath, 1994–2002
- Senator Arthur Mayo III, R/D-Bath, 2002–2006
- Senator Paula Benoit, R-Phippsburg, 2006–2008
- Senator Seth Goodall, D-Richmond, 2008–2013
  - Eloise Vitelli was elected to the Maine Senate in the special election to replace Senator Goodall.
- Senator Linda Baker, R-Topsham, 2014–2017
- Senator Eloise Vitelli, D-Arrowsic, 2017–Present

=== Voter registration ===
Voter registration and party enrollment as of March 2024
Democratic	10,336	37.48%
Unenrolled	8,177	29.65%
Republican	7,501	27.2%
Green Independent	1,105	4.01%
No Labels	370	1.34%
Libertarian	88	0.32%
Total	27,577	100%

=== Presidential election results ===
Sagadahoc County is a reliable state bellwether, having voted for Maine's statewide winner in every presidential election since 1948.

United States presidential election results for Sagadahoc County, Maine
Year	Republican		Democratic		Third party(ies)	
Year	No.	%	No.	%	No.	%
1880	2,932	61.84%	1,761	37.14%	48	1.01%
1884	2,730	64.01%	1,278	29.96%	257	6.03%
1888	2,536	63.24%	1,246	31.07%	228	5.69%
1892	2,265	61.27%	1,278	34.57%	154	4.17%
1896	2,725	71.60%	957	25.14%	124	3.26%
1900	2,245	64.49%	1,025	29.45%	211	6.06%
1904	1,948	66.76%	754	25.84%	216	7.40%
1908	1,776	64.00%	838	30.20%	161	5.80%
1912	885	25.31%	1,331	38.06%	1,281	36.63%
1916	1,828	49.01%	1,791	48.02%	111	2.98%
1920	3,857	68.36%	1,709	30.29%	76	1.35%
1924	3,518	73.26%	1,084	22.57%	200	4.16%
1928	4,605	74.18%	1,583	25.50%	20	0.32%
1932	4,220	59.97%	2,763	39.26%	54	0.77%
1936	3,707	51.99%	3,273	45.90%	150	2.10%
1940	3,504	43.30%	4,575	56.54%	13	0.16%
1944	3,883	49.22%	4,003	50.74%	3	0.04%
1948	3,745	58.77%	2,556	40.11%	71	1.11%
1952	5,799	66.90%	2,850	32.88%	19	0.22%
1956	6,201	72.94%	2,301	27.06%	0	0.00%
1960	6,386	61.69%	3,965	38.31%	0	0.00%
1964	2,733	28.06%	7,006	71.93%	1	0.01%
1968	4,126	41.73%	5,553	56.16%	209	2.11%
1972	6,463	65.35%	3,414	34.52%	13	0.13%
1976	5,988	50.42%	5,529	46.56%	359	3.02%
1980	5,946	45.23%	5,663	43.08%	1,536	11.69%
1984	9,222	63.51%	5,208	35.87%	90	0.62%
1988	8,825	58.22%	6,212	40.98%	121	0.80%
1992	5,917	31.96%	6,828	36.88%	5,768	31.16%
1996	5,346	31.59%	8,417	49.73%	3,161	18.68%
2000	8,052	43.75%	8,844	48.05%	1,510	8.20%
2004	9,497	45.05%	11,107	52.69%	475	2.25%
2008	8,721	40.94%	12,152	57.05%	428	2.01%
2012	8,429	40.54%	11,821	56.85%	544	2.62%
2016	9,304	43.04%	10,664	49.33%	1,648	7.62%
2020	9,755	40.58%	13,528	56.28%	755	3.14%
2024	9,917	40.55%	13,982	57.17%	557	2.28%

== Communities ==
=== City ===
- Bath (county seat)

=== Towns ===
- Arrowsic
- Bowdoin
- Bowdoinham
- Georgetown
- Phippsburg
- Richmond
- Topsham
- West Bath
- Woolwich

=== Unorganized territory ===
- Perkins Township (Swan Island)

=== Census-designated places ===
- Bowdoinham
- Richmond
- Topsham

== Education ==
School districts include:

- Georgetown School District
- West Bath Public Schools
- Regional School Unit 01
- Regional School Unit 02
- School Administrative District 75

A portion of the area is in the "Sagadahoc Unorganized Territory". Unorganized territories are not in any municipality. The Maine Department of Education takes responsibility for coordinating school assignments in the unorganized territory.

== See also ==
- National Register of Historic Places listings in Sagadahoc County, Maine
- Territory of Sagadahock – English colony in what is now eastern Maine
