= George Higgins =

George Higgins may refer to:

- George C. Higgins (1845–1933), Massachusetts politician
- George Higgins (cricketer) (1868–1951), English cricketer active 1894 to 1895 who played for Essex
- George G. Higgins (1916–2002), labor activist
- George Gore Ousley Higgins, Irish politician
- George Higgins (footballer, born 1880), Scottish footballer (Queen's Park FC)
- George Higgins (footballer, born 1925), Scottish footballer (Blackburn Rovers, Bolton Wanderers, Grimsby Town)
- George V. Higgins (1939–1999), American writer
- George W. Higgins, American minister of the Holy Ghost and Us Society
- George Higgins, character in the film 8mm
