= Levant, Maine =

Town in Maine, United States

- Town
- Seal

- Location within Maine Location within the United States
- Coordinates: 44°53′11″N 68°59′52″W
- Country: United States
- State: Maine
- County: Penobscot
- Incorporated (town): 1813

Area
  - Total: 30.07 sq mi (77.88 km^{2})
  - Land: 30.06 sq mi (77.86 km^{2})
  - Water: 0.012 sq mi (0.03 km^{2})
- Elevation: 289 ft (88 m)

Population (2020)
  - Total: 2,940
  - Density: 98/sq mi (37.8/km^{2})
- Time zone: UTC-5 (Eastern (EST))
  - Summer (DST): UTC-4 (EDT)
- ZIP code: 04456
- Area code: 207
- FIPS code: 23-38705
- GNIS feature ID: 582553
- Website: townoflevant.net

Levant is a town in Penobscot County, Maine, United States. The population was 2,970 at the 2020 census.

== History ==
Originally called Kenduskeag Plantation, the town was founded in 1802 by Major Moses Hodsden who built three houses, a sawmill, a grist-mill, a store, and a blacksmith shop in what is now the village of Kenduskeag. At the time, these were likely the only framed buildings between Bangor and the Kennebec River. In 1813 the plantation became a town, and was given the name Levant, which is that part of the Middle East which borders the Mediterranean.

In 1852, the village of Kenduskeag broke away from the rest of Levant and took part of the neighboring town of Glenburn to form the present town of Kenduskeag. Prior to the break the town had 1,841 inhabitants.

In early 1824, Levant Congregational minister John Bovee Dods claimed that he was visited by a spirit, and his house subsequently became the site of poltergeist activity. Perhaps a hundred curious people were said to have visited and witnessed these events. Dods became a Universalist in 1826, and moved to nearby Union, though he continued to preach in Levant. He later moved to Massachusetts and became an early psychologist, publishing The Philosophy of Electrical Psychology in 1850, and lecturing widely. In 1856 he converted to spiritualism, and became a leading figure in that religion in New York City.

One of the last tarring and feathering episodes in Maine took place in Levant in 1899, the victim being an evangelical minister named George W. Higgins of the Disciples of the Holy Ghost, whose headquarters was the Shiloh Temple in Durham, Maine, and whose spiritual leader was Frank Sandford. Higgins had made about 15 converts in Levant, and encouraged them to turn over all their property to Sandford and go to live in the Durham temple. After one member had committed suicide and Higgins had told another to whip a small child because he was possessed by a demon, two selectmen ordered him to leave town. When he refused, a mob seized him, covered him with hot tar and feathers, and rode him on a rail a number of miles to the town line, some following behind in carriages. An area in town where many "Higginsites" lived was known as "Higginsville" as late as the 1930s.

== Geography ==
According to the United States Census Bureau, the town has a total area of 30.07 square miles (77.88 km^{2}), of which 30.06 square miles (77.86 km^{2}) is land and 0.01 square miles (0.03 km^{2}) is water.

== Demographics ==
Historical population
Census	Pop.	Note	%±
1820	143		—
1830	747		422.4%
1840	1,061		42.0%
1850	1,841		73.5%
1860	1,301		−29.3%
1870	1,159		−10.9%
1880	1,076		−7.2%
1890	880		−18.2%
1900	789		−10.3%
1910	707		−10.4%
1920	602		−14.9%
1930	596		−1.0%
1940	661		10.9%
1950	706		6.8%
1960	765		8.4%
1970	802		4.8%
1980	1,117		39.3%
1990	1,627		45.7%
2000	2,171		33.4%
2010	2,851		31.3%
2020	2,940		3.1%
U.S. Decennial Census

=== 2010 census ===
As of the census of 2010, there were 2,851 people, 1,081 households, and 800 families living in the town. The population density was 94.8 inhabitants per square mile (36.6/km^{2}). There were 1,146 housing units at an average density of 38.1 per square mile (14.7/km^{2}). The racial makeup of the town was 96.6% White, 0.2% African American, 0.6% Native American, 0.6% Asian, and 2.0% from two or more races. Hispanic or Latino of any race were 0.8% of the population.

There were 1,081 households, of which 36.7% had children under the age of 18 living with them, 59.3% were married couples living together, 9.3% had a female householder with no husband present, 5.5% had a male householder with no wife present, and 26.0% were non-families. 17.9% of all households were made up of individuals, and 6.9% had someone living alone who was 65 years of age or older. The average household size was 2.64 and the average family size was 2.95.

The median age in the town was 37.9 years. 24.6% of residents were under the age of 18; 8.2% were between the ages of 18 and 24; 28% were from 25 to 44; 28.7% were from 45 to 64; and 10.7% were 65 years of age or older. The gender makeup of the town was 50.7% male and 49.3% female.

=== 2000 census ===
As of the census of 2000, there were 2,171 people, 784 households, and 609 families living in the town. The population density was 72.5 inhabitants per square mile (28.0/km^{2}). There were 829 housing units at an average density of 27.7 per square mile (10.7/km^{2}). The racial makeup of the town was 97.51% White, 0.14% African American, 0.69% Native American, 0.18% Asian, 0.05% from other races, and 1.43% from two or more races. Hispanic or Latino of any race were 0.74% of the population.

There were 784 households, out of which 39.7% had children under the age of 18 living with them, 66.2% were married couples living together, 7.4% had a female householder with no husband present, and 22.2% were non-families. 16.8% of all households were made up of individuals, and 4.8% had someone living alone who was 65 years of age or older. The average household size was 2.77 and the average family size was 3.09.

In the town, the population was spread out, with 29.1% under the age of 18, 6.7% from 18 to 24, 34.7% from 25 to 44, 22.3% from 45 to 64, and 7.2% who were 65 years of age or older. The median age was 35 years. For every 100 females, there were 98.6 males. For every 100 females age 18 and over, there were 100.7 males.

The median income for a household in the town was $41,290, and the median income for a family was $45,368. Males had a median income of $32,214 versus $22,431 for females. The per capita income for the town was $18,671. About 9.0% of families and 10.6% of the population were below the poverty line, including 12.0% of those under age 18 and 14.4% of those age 65 or over.

== Notable people ==
- Chris Greeley, Maine state representative
- Abigail Griffin, state legislator
- William Thomas Haines (1854–1919), 49th governor of Maine
- George Varney, Civil War-era general
- Dana White, president of the UFC
