= George W. Higgins =

American minister

George W. Higgins was an American minister of the Holy Ghost and Us Society. He was probably the last person in New England to be subjected to the traditional mob-led humiliations of tarring and feathering and riding the rail. The incident occurred in Levant, Maine, just outside Bangor in 1899, and resulted in the trial of 29 members of a mob numbering about 150 persons.

Higgins was from Calais, Maine. The Holy Ghost and Us Society was a millenarian religious sect founded by Frank Sandford, and headquartered at Shiloh Temple in Durham, Maine. Sandford encouraged his followers to donate all their property to the church and live communally at Shiloh. As a missionary for the Society, Higgins had made about 15 converts in the town of Levant, including some prosperous farmers who had been induced to give up their property to the church. Known locally as 'Higginsites', the sect was blamed by townspeople for the suicide of an elderly blind woman who was one of its members, and for administering a beating to a child whom Higgins had claimed was possessed by a demon.

Two of Levant's selectmen asked Higgins to leave town, which he refused to do. A mob of about 150, some of whom were masked, dragged Higgins from the house of disciple Ruel Clement one night in 1899, stripped him naked, covered him with hot tar, and applied a coat of chicken feathers. He was then ridden to the edge of town on a wooden rail, and left there with the warning not to return. He did return to Clement's house, however, and Clement's complaint to the Sheriff of Penobscot County led to the arrest and trial in Bangor of 29 people, many of them 'solid citizens' of Levant.

In 1901 Ruel Clement contracted typhoid and died without taking medicine or seeing a doctor, believing his faith would cure him. Higgins returned to Levant to conduct the funeral.

U.S. Senator Frederick Hale of Maine recounted that when he challenged the Ambassador of China over the bad treatment received by some American missionaries in that country, in 1899, Ambassador Wu brought up the "Levantine Affair" (Higgin's tarring and feathering) as a counter-example of domestic religious intolerance, leaving Hale speechless.
