= West Durham Methodist Church =

Historic church in Maine, United States

- U.S. National Register of Historic Places
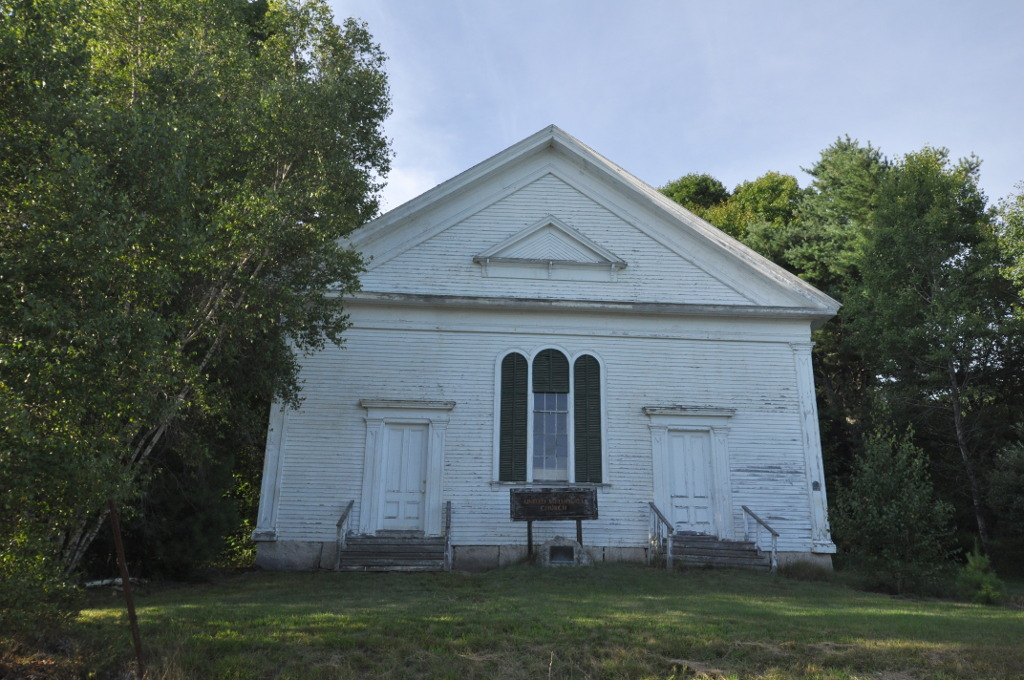

- Location within Maine Location within the United States
- Location: 23 Runaround Pond Rd., West Durham, Maine
- Coordinates: 43.9493°N 70.1493°W
- Built: 1804
- Architectural style: Greek Revival, Italianate
- NRHP reference No.: 03000291
- Added to NRHP: April 22, 2003

The West Durham Methodist Church is an historic Methodist church at 23 Runaround Pond Road in West Durham, Maine. Built in the early 19th century and significantly restyled in 1867, it is a fine example of Greek Revival architecture with added Italianate features. The congregation for which it was built grew out of a Methodist revival meeting held at the site in 1804, and was one of the first Methodist congregations in the state. The building was listed on the National Register of Historic Places in 2003. It is presently unused.

== Description and history ==
The West Durham Methodist Church is located in a rural area of central-western Durham, on the north side of Runaround Pond Road, a short way west of its junction with Hallowell Road (Maine State Route 9). It is a single-story wood-frame structure, with a front gable roof, clapboard siding, and a stone foundation. A small square section projects from the north (rear) of the building, providing a small apse in the interior. The south-facing front facade is symmetrically arrange, exhibiting predominantly Greek Revival features. It has corner pilasters rising to a broad entablature, with a fully pedimented gable that has a triangular bracketed panel at its center. A pair of entrances flank a three-part window, where each section has a rounded top. The entrances are each flanked by pilasters and topped by an entablature and cornice. The entrances each lead to small separate vestibules, which are separate from each other by a recess in the main chamber that houses the choir. The main chamber is simply arranged, with bench pews on either side of a central aisle, and the pulpit set in the apsidal recess.

The building's construction date is somewhat murky. The building site was the location of an early Methodist revival meeting, held in 1802, and was by local tradition built in 1804, the date appearing in a panel on the front of the building. However, the congregation was not formally organized until 1810, and the property was not transferred to church trustees until 1818 (although it may have been in use by the church since before then). The building has architectural evidence that its interior at one time had a three-sided gallery and a different orientation of its pews, suggesting an early 19th-century construction date. The exterior's Greek Revival and Italianate features in all likelihood date from a major 1867 renovation (even though the Greek Revival was generally out of fashion by then), at which time interior alterations may also have been made. The church's parish originally stretched from Litchfield to Freeport.

== See also ==
- National Register of Historic Places listings in Androscoggin County, Maine
