= Patriots' Day =

Civic holiday in the US

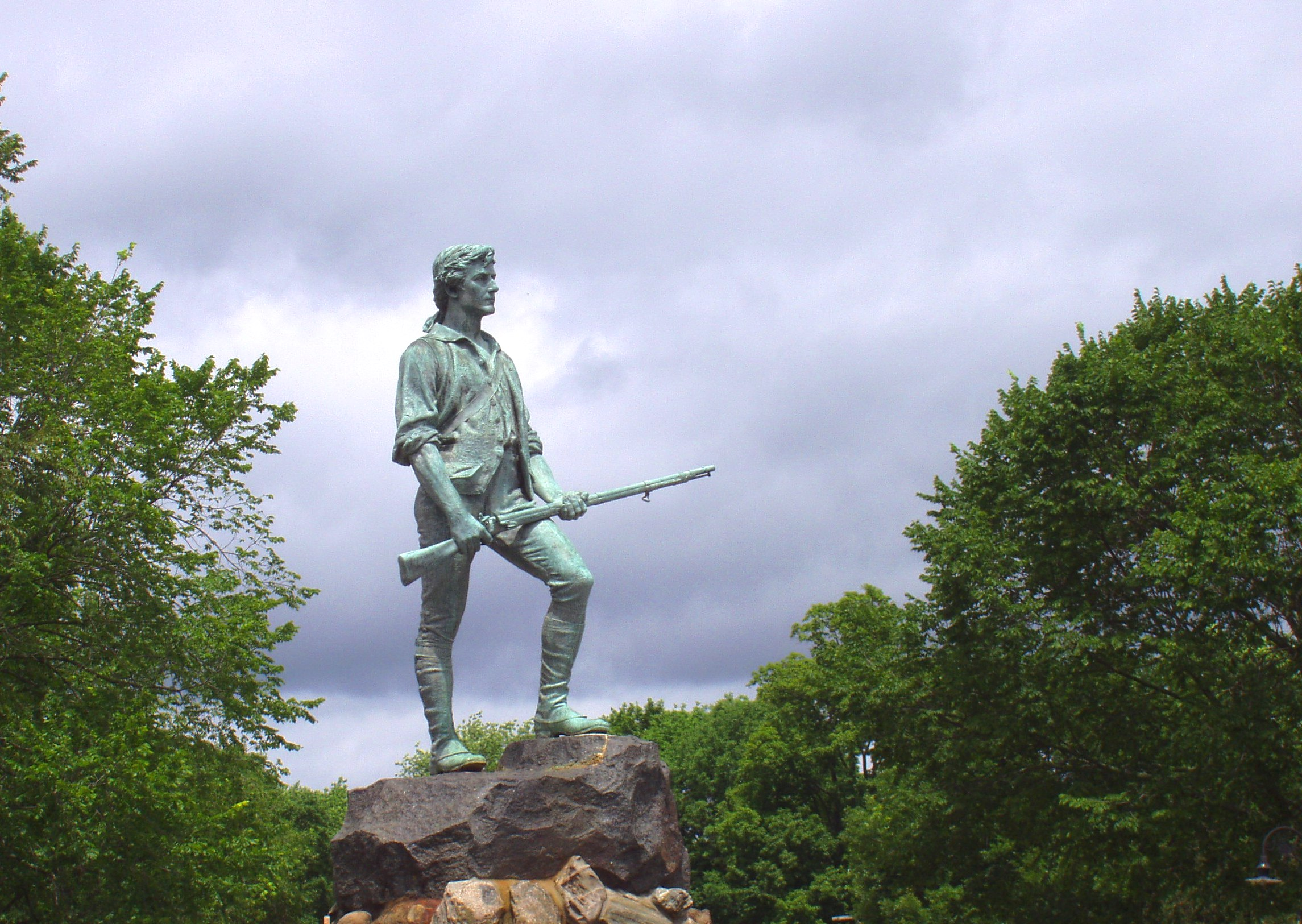
- Statue of the Lexington Minuteman on the Lexington Green in Lexington, Massachusetts
- Observed by: Massachusetts; Maine; Florida (on April 19); Wisconsin (on April 19); Connecticut; North Dakota; Tennessee (on April 19); Utah (on April 19)
- Type: Historical
- Celebrations: Boston Marathon
- Observances: Battles of Lexington and Concord and Menotomy
- Date: Third Monday in April
- 2025 date: April 21
- 2026 date: April 20
- 2027 date: April 19
- 2028 date: April 17
- Frequency: Annual

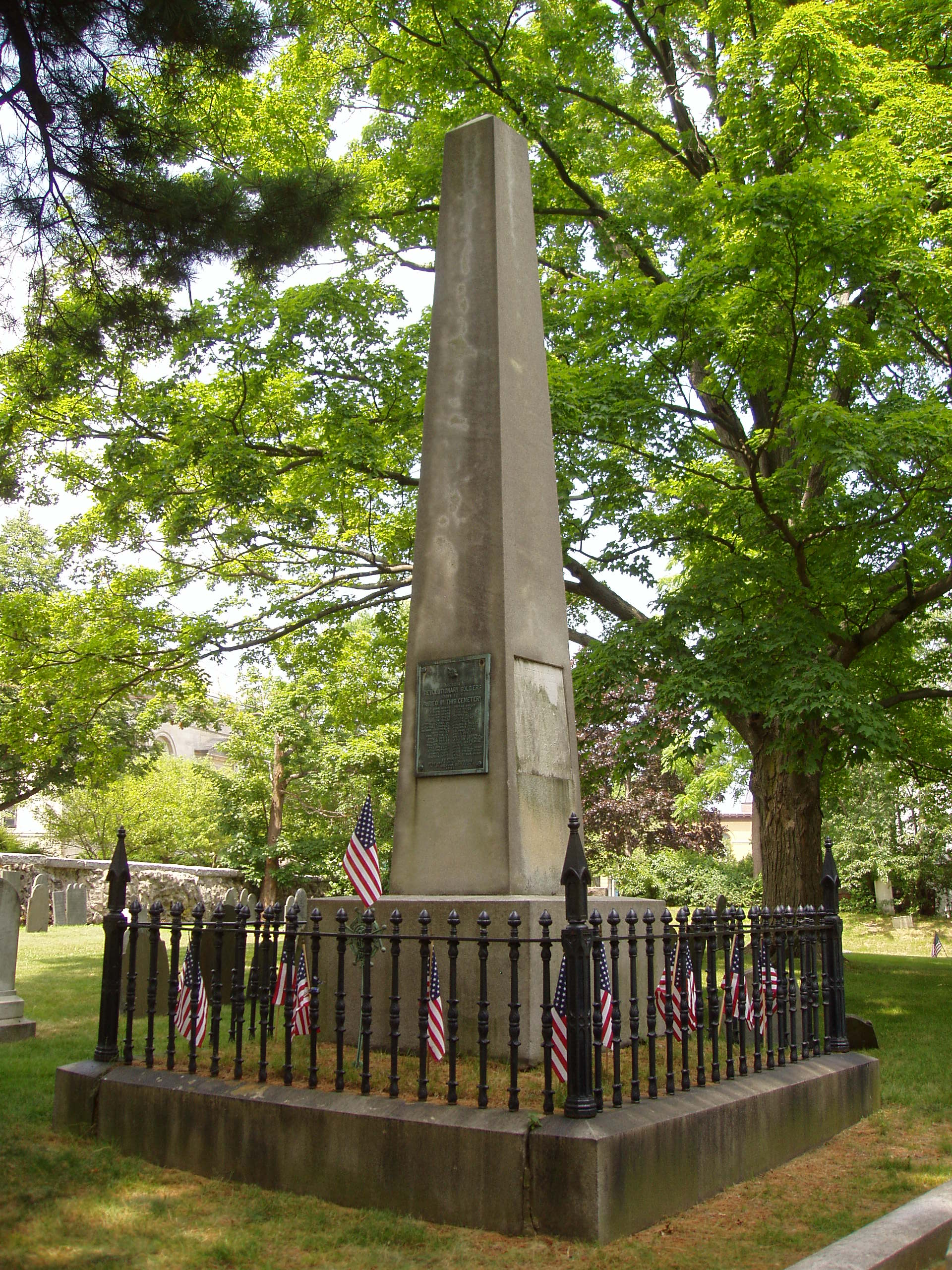
Patriots' Grave in the Old Burying Ground cemetery, Arlington, Massachusetts

Patriots' Day (Patriot's Day in Maine) is an annual event, formalized as a legal holiday or a special observance day in eight U.S. states, commemorating the battles of Lexington, Concord, and Menotomy, the inaugural battles of the American Revolutionary War. The holiday occurs annually on the third Monday in April in four states and on April 19 in four, with celebrations including battle reenactments and the Boston Marathon.

== History ==
In 1894, the Lexington Historical Society petitioned the Massachusetts General Court to proclaim April 19 as "Lexington Day". Concord countered with "Concord Day". However, the biggest battle fought on this day was in the town of Menotomy—now Arlington, Massachusetts—on the Concord Road between Lexington and Boston. Governor Frederic T. Greenhalge opted for an inclusive compromise: Patriots' Day.

Governor Greenhalge proclaimed Patriots' Day in Massachusetts in 1894, replacing Fast Day as a public holiday. It was established on April 19, commemorating the date of the Battles of Lexington and Concord and the larger Battle of Menotomy in 1775, and consolidating the longstanding municipal observances of Lexington Day and Concord Day. It also marked the first bloodshed of the American Civil War in the Baltimore riot of 1861. The dual commemoration, Greenhalge explained, celebrated "the anniversary of the birth of liberty and union". It is likely that the battles that took place in Menotomy are not as well known as the smaller battles in Lexington and Concord because the town has had several names since that day in 1775. In 1938, the Massachusetts legislature passed a bill establishing the holiday "in commemoration of the opening events of the War of the Revolution".

Maine followed Massachusetts in 1907 and replaced its Fast Day with Patriot's Day. Tennessee established April 19th of each year as Patriot's Day on July 1st, 2008. On June 10, 2017, Governor Dannel Malloy signed a bill establishing Patriots' Day as a statewide unpaid holiday in Connecticut, and Connecticut became the sixth state to recognize the holiday on April 16, 2018. On March 19, 2019, Governor Doug Burgum signed a bill recognizing Patriots' Day in the state of North Dakota. In 2025, two hundred and fifty years after the shot was fired, Governor Spencer Cox signed a bill recognizing Patriot's Day in Utah.

== Description ==
The holiday was originally celebrated on April 19, the actual anniversary of the battles (fought in 1775). Since 1969, it has been observed on the third Monday in April in Massachusetts and in Maine (which until the Missouri Compromise of 1820 was part of Massachusetts). The Monday holiday creates a three-day long weekend. It is also the first day of a vacation week for public schools in both states and a school holiday for many local colleges and universities, both public and private.

The day is a public school observance day in Wisconsin. Florida law also encourages people to celebrate it, though it is not treated as a legal holiday. Connecticut began observance in 2018 and North Dakota in 2019. Utah recognized April 19th as Patriot's Day in 2025.

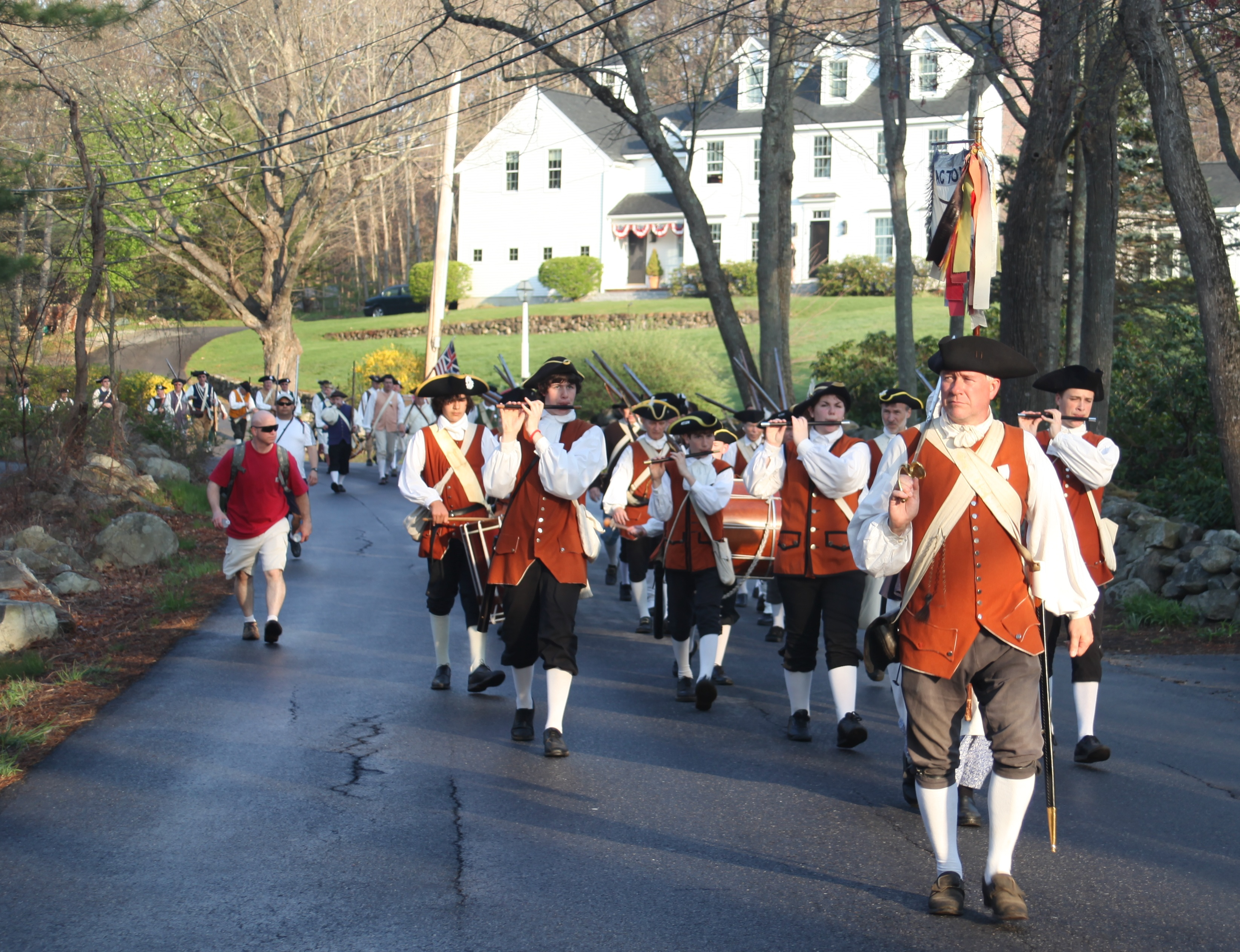
Acton Minutemen and citizens marching from Acton to Concord on Patriots' Day 2012

== Observances ==
Re-enactments of the battles occur annually at Lexington Green in Lexington, Massachusetts (around 6:00 am) and the Old North Bridge in Concord, Massachusetts (around 9:00 am) and in Arlington, Massachusetts on the Sunday before Patriot's Day. Tours are available of the Jason Russell House in Arlington, Massachusetts on Sunday and Monday. On Monday morning, mounted re-enactors with state police escorts retrace the Midnight Rides of Paul Revere and William Dawes, calling out warnings the whole way.

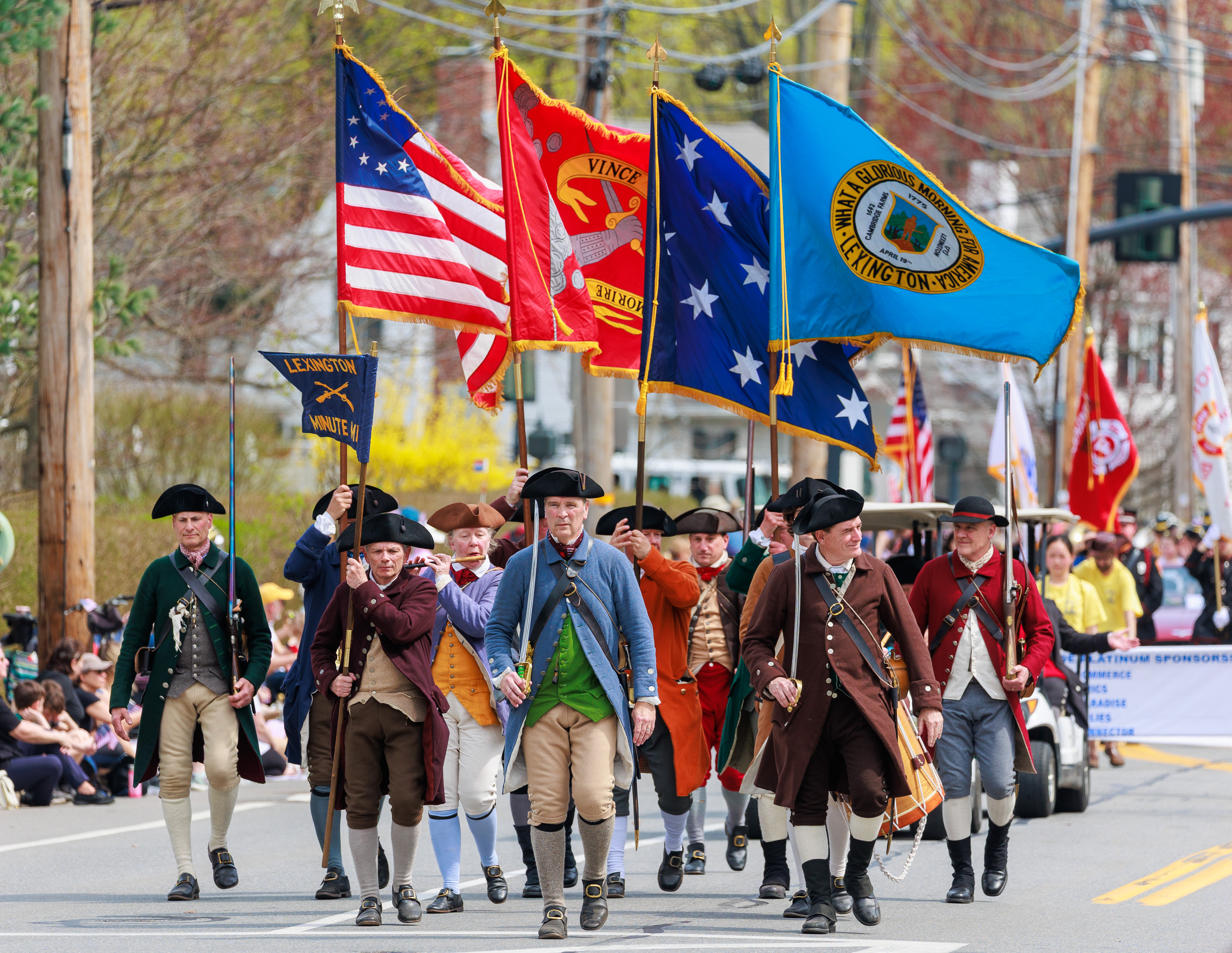
Lexington Minute Men lead Lexington's parade

Up to 60 events take place before and during the Patriots' Day weekend. Battle re-enactments are held in several locations including Boston, Cambridge, Arlington, Medford, Lexington, Concord, and Lincoln, plus a few others. Parades are held in Lexington, Concord, Boston, Bedford, and Arlington. Other observances of the weekend include tours of historic houses and pancake breakfasts.

=== Sporting events ===
The most significant celebration of Patriots' Day is the Boston Marathon, which has been run every Patriots' Day since April 19, 1897 (except in 2020 and 2021) to mark the then-recently established holiday, with the race linking the Athenian and American struggles for liberty.

The Boston Red Sox have been scheduled to play at home in Fenway Park on Patriots' Day every year since 1959. The game was postponed due to weather in 1959, 1961, 1965, 1967, 1984, and 2018. It was canceled in 1995 due to the baseball strike, and again in 2020 due to COVID-19. The game was played in 2013 despite the Boston Marathon bombing because it had finished before the bombs went off. From 1968 to 2006 the games started early, in the morning, around 11:00 am. The early start to these games usually resulted in the games' ending just as the runners headed through Kenmore Square. However, since 2007 the marathon has started between 9:30 am and 10:00 am, causing the racers to pass through Kenmore closer to the middle of the Red Sox game.

== See also ==
- Bunker Hill Day
- Evacuation Day (Massachusetts)
- Minor American Revolution holidays
- Holidays of the United States
