= George Varney =

American politician (1834–1911)

- Born: 1834; Levant, Maine, US
- Died: 1911 (aged 76–77)
- Military career
- Allegiance: United States
- Branch: United States Army
- Rank: Colonel
- Unit: 2nd Maine Volunteer Infantry Regiment
- Conflicts: First Battle of Bull Run
- Awards: Brevet Brigadier General (1867)
- Other work: Member of the Maine House of Representatives

George Varney (1834–1911) was a colonel in the Union Army during the American Civil War and was awarded the grade of brevet brigadier general, United States Volunteers, in 1867 for his gallant service at the Battle of Fredericksburg on December 13, 1862. Born in Levant, Maine, he was a wholesale grocer in Bangor, Maine when the war broke out in 1861.

Varney enlisted as a major in the 2nd Maine Volunteer Infantry Regiment, which was the first unit to march out of the state in response to President Abraham Lincoln's call for volunteers to suppress the rebellion after the fall of Fort Sumter. He was wounded and captured in the unit's first engagement, the First Battle of Bull Run, in July 1861, but exchanged for a captured Confederate officer a month later. Promoted to lieutenant colonel, Varney was captured a second time (and exchanged a second time) at the Battle of Gaines' Mill in 1862. He suffered a head wound at the Battle of Fredericksburg. Lt. Colonel Varney led his regiment along an unfinished railroad cut to get closer to the stone wall on Marye's Heights. A shell fragment struck him on the head and dropped him senseless to the ground. Major Daniel F. Sargent assumed command of the regiment and led it out of the cut where it disintegrated almost immediately under withering rifle and artillery fire from the Confederates behind the stone wall on Marye's Heights.

Lt. Colonel Varney recovered from his wound and was made colonel of the regiment on January 10, 1863, with the retirement of Colonel Charles W. Roberts. Colonel Varney was honorably mustered out of the United States Volunteers on June 9, 1863.

Varney served a term in the Maine House of Representatives in 1864, representing Bangor, Maine.

Varney was among a number of colonels and lower ranking officers who were awarded the honorary grade of brevet brigadier generals to rank from March 13, 1865. President Andrew Johnson nominated Colonel Varney for the award of brevet brigadier general, United States Volunteers, on January 18, 1867, and the brevet was confirmed by the U. S. Senate on February 21, 1867, to rank from March 13, 1865.

Varney lived the rest of his life in Bangor and is one of eight union generals buried at Mount Hope Cemetery.

Varney's letters and other papers were discovered by a descendant, Robert W. P. Cutler, in 1980 and published in the book The Tin Box (Morris Pub., 1999)
