= Fast Day =

US regional holiday

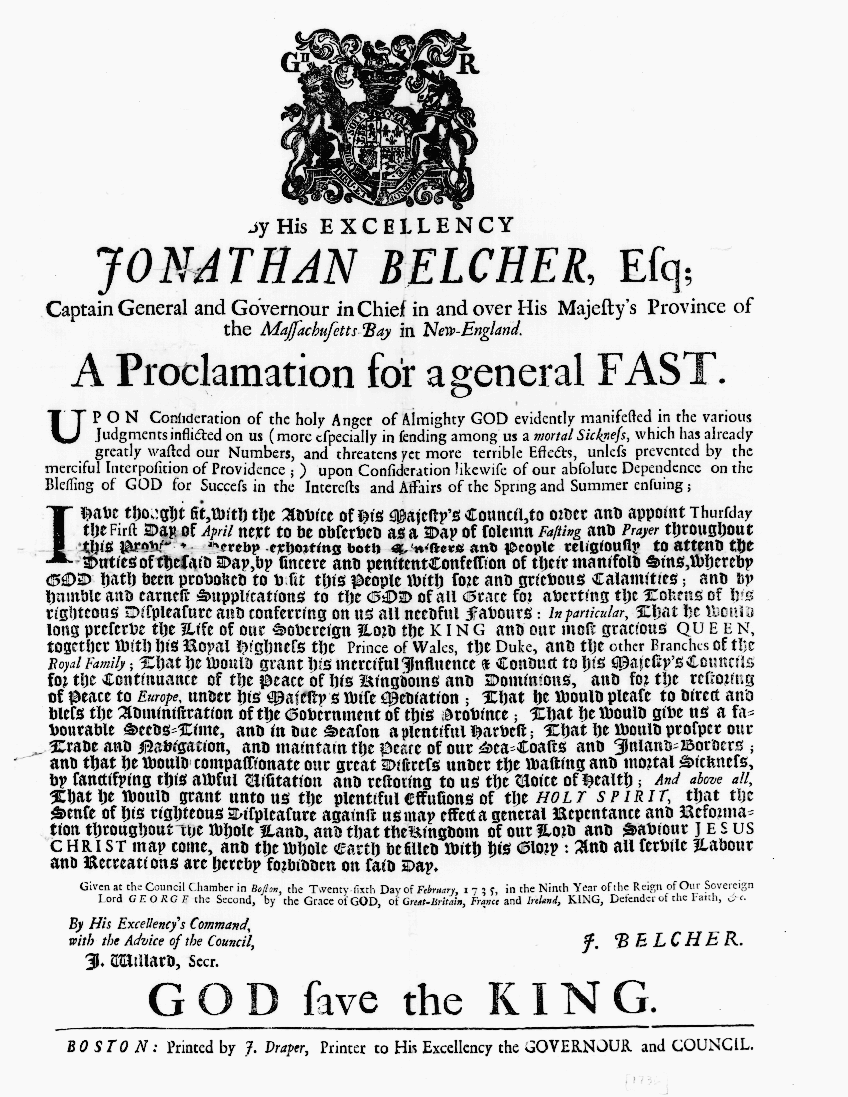
Massachusetts colonial Governor Jonathan Belcher's February 26, 1735 (NS 1736) proclamation of a fast day for April 1.

Fast Day was a holiday observed in some parts of the United States between 1670 and 1991.

"A day of public fasting and prayer," it was traditionally observed in the New England states. It had its origin in days of prayer and repentance proclaimed in the early days of the British American colonies by Royal Governors, to avoid such calamities as plagues, natural disasters or crop failures; it was common to hold a Fast Day before the spring planting (cf. rogation days). It was observed by church attendance, fasting, and abstinence from secular activities.

A Fast Day could be added for any particular reason in a particular year, rather than being instituted as an ongoing annual holiday. The earliest known Fast Day was proclaimed in colonial Boston, held on September 8, 1670. The colonial Province of New Hampshire proclaimed a Fast Day for February 26, 1680, seeking "God's blessing" on an upcoming General Assembly and for good weather during spring planting. The following year, when illness struck John Cutt, the president of the Province of New Hampshire, and a comet was seen in the sky, the province designated March 17, 1681 a Fast Day in response to these signs of "divine displeasure". The image at right shows that Jonathan Belcher, colonial governor of the Province of Massachusetts Bay, declared a Fast Day in 1735 because of "the holy Anger of Almighty God, evidently manifested in the various judgments inflicted on us", specifically highlighting a "mortal sickness" that had been divinely inflicted on the colonists.

Fast Day had lost its significance as a religious holiday by the late 19th century. It was abolished by Massachusetts in 1894, when that state replaced their Fast Day, celebrated on the third Monday in April, with Patriots' Day, commemorating the Battles of Lexington and Concord and the Battle of Menotomy on the first day (April 19, 1775) of the American Revolutionary War. Maine, which also celebrated Fast Day on the third Monday in April, changed it to Patriot's Day in 1907. Fast Day continued in New Hampshire until 1991, with the late April holiday signifying only the opening of the summer tourist season; the state dropped Fast Day in 1991, replacing it with the January Civil Rights Day, which they renamed Martin Luther King Jr. Day (the last U.S. state to do so) in 1999.
