= John Bovee Dods =

American psychologist

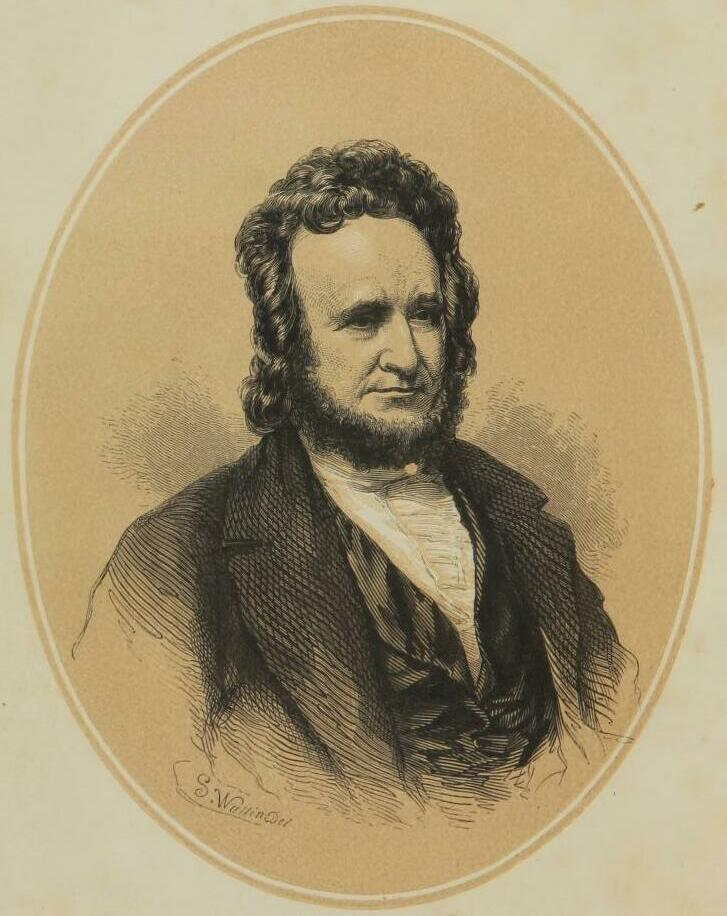
- John Bovee Dods, c. 1850
- Born: September 26, 1795; Florida, Montgomery County, New York, U.S.
- Died: March 21, 1872 (aged 76); Brooklyn, New York, U.S.

John Bovee Dods (26 September 1795 – 21 March 1872) was a philosopher, spiritualist, mesmerist, and early psychologist.

In 1809, as a young teenager, Dods had a waking vision of his recently deceased father, who gave him a message from the spirit world. In 1824, as a newly appointed Congregationalist pastor in Levant, Maine, his house was visited by other ghostly relatives, and his family became plagued by poltergeist style phenomena. Although his family had to move and his neighbors came to consider the house haunted, Dods considered the phenomena a divine blessing. What he learned about the spirit world from his relatives' ghosts converted him to Christian universalism.

In 1830, Dods spent 10 weeks in Richmond, Virginia organizing Unitarians and Universalists into a single church, The First Unitarian Universalist Church of Richmond. This is believed to have been the first instance of the two faiths combining together into one organization, presaging the formation of the Unitarian Universalist Association by 130 years. However, due to a tremendous outcry from Richmond's mainline Christians, the church was forced to change its name after Dods had left to First Independent Christian Church in 1833. The same church group continues today as First Unitarian Universalist Church of Richmond. As Dods did not accept the offer to be pastor of the church, he instead recommended John Budd Pitkin.

In 1840, Dods began preparing a book about his spiritual visions, but in the course of his writing, he learned about a new technique called mesmerism. He began experimenting with mesmerizing his acquaintances and discovered he was able to induce spiritual visions easily. He therefore became convinced that his earlier visions had been manufactured by his mind, and abandoned his book. For the next 15 years he practiced mesmerism as a type of psychiatric therapy, believing it to have no relation to religion.

Moving to Brooklyn for his psychiatric practice, Dods became well known as a debunker of early Spiritualism, and published a book claiming to give a medical explanation for spiritualist phenomena. In 1855 he again had a vision of a host of dead relatives who, in his account, gave him accurate information about their deaths and illnesses in his family. He wrote that he tried to explain this as a naturalistic phenomenon but only had more and more visions, and was deluged with questions about his personal experiences when he tried to defend his views in public. From 1856 he became a practicing spiritualist. He moved to Massachusetts where he preached, wrote, and founded a school.

As a result of the public questioning, Dods began to theorize that mesmerism put humans in touch with the divine. His resulting theology was in some ways was a precursor of New Thought theories. Dods became one of the more well known mesmerists in New England, along with others such as La Roy Sunderland, Joseph Rodes Buchanan, and Phineas Parkhurst Quimby.

Before the revelation of his Spiritualism, Dods had been a prolific writer. He published works such as Twenty-Four Short Sermons on the Doctrine of Universal Salvation (1832), Thirty Sermons (1840), Six Lectures on the Philosophy of Mesmerism (1849), The Philosophy of Electrical Psychology (1850), Immortality Triumphant (1852), and Spirit Manifestations: Examined and Explained (1854).
