= Shiloh Temple =

- U.S. National Register of Historic Places
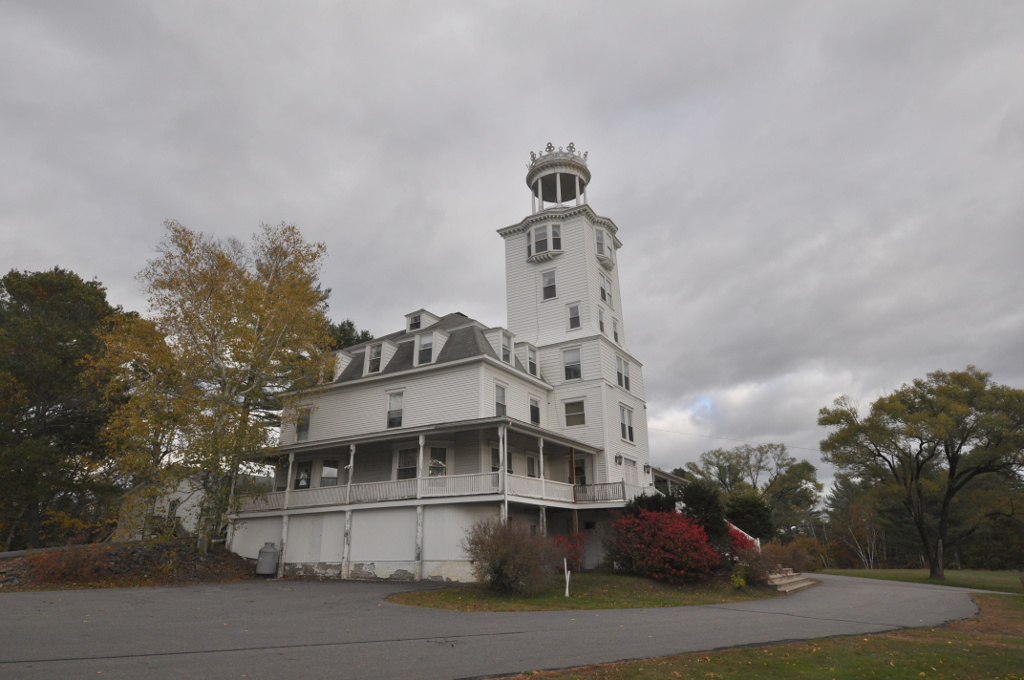
- Shiloh Chapel in 2019

- Location within Maine Location within the United States
- Location: 38 Beulah Lane, Durham, Maine
- Coordinates: 43°58′49″N 70°2′50″W
- Area: 4 acres (1.6 ha) (listed area)
- Built: 1897
- Architectural style: Late 19th And Early 20th Century American Movements
- NRHP reference No.: 75000203
- Added to NRHP: May 12, 1975

The Shiloh Temple, now Shiloh Chapel, is a historic religious facility in Durham, Maine. Built in 1897, the building is a small portion of the once-extensive religious enclave established by the evangelical Christian leader Frank Sandford. The building was listed on the National Register of Historic Places in 1975.

== History ==
Frank Sandford was an ordained Baptist minister who in 1893 left his ministry in Topsham, Maine after claiming to hear the voice of God tell him to leave. He wandered around Maine's coastal hill regions and over time attracted a large number of followers.

In 1897, after Sandford became convinced that God wanted him to build a home for his Bible school near Durham, Maine, construction of the Shiloh Temple began. The commune was initially called "The Holy Ghost and Us," but over time the name Shiloh, initially just referring to the Temple building, was applied to the entire property. At its height, the complex had 500 rooms and space for more than 1,000 residents.

Starting around 1901, Sandford claimed he was an incarnation of the prophet Elijah. After a visit to Jerusalem in 1902, he claimed to be an incarnation of the biblical King David, as well.

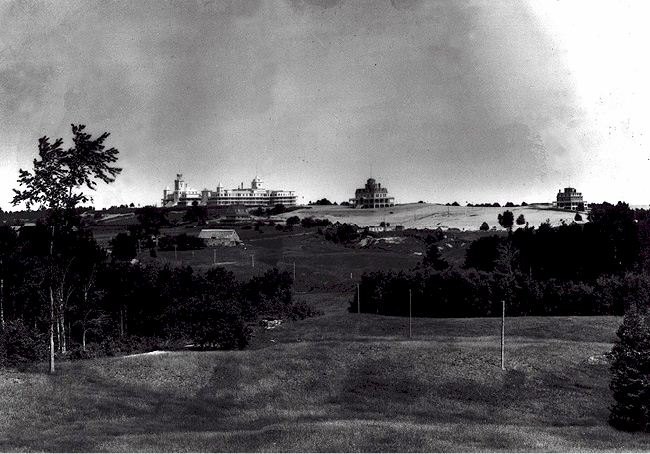
The temple and surrounding complex in 1901

Life at Shiloh was strictly regulated by Sandford. He encouraged parents to whip children for perceived sins and in 1903 he mandated a thirty-six hour Nineveh fast for everyone at Shiloh, including infants, animals, and the sick. A fourteen-year-old boy who had previously tried to escape Shiloh, Leander Bartlett, died of diphtheria while forced to take part in the fast. Shortly after, Sandford ordered his own six-year-old son to be deprived of food and water until he declared himself glad to be whipped. Sandford was charged with cruelty to children and manslaughter for each of these incidents, but escaped serious prison time due to a hung jury.

Around 1905, Sandford used his followers money to purchase the racing yacht Coronet. Despite his claims that their trips were missionary expeditions, Sandford and his followers did not go ashore to preach, instead sounding trumpets as they passed by shorelines in the belief that the noise would convert listeners to Christianity.

While near Africa in 1910, a secondary ship of Shiloh members was grounded, and all the passengers boarded the Coronet, overloading it. Shortly after this, Sandford claimed to hear God telling him "Continue," which he interpreted to mean he had to sail to Greenland. The Coronet attempted to do so, with Sandford passing up many opportunities to resupply for food and supplies along the way. In late 1911, crew members began to fall victim to scurvy. After a quiet mutiny against Sandford, the ship was turned towards Portland, Maine, and Sandford was charged with manslaughter in the deaths of six crew members. He was imprisoned for nearly seven years, during which time Shiloh persevered under temporary leadership.

When Sandford returned to Shiloh in 1918 he was welcomed with a large meal, even though many residents had been coping with serious illness and hunger for months. One of Sandford's daughters ran away from the cult while he was imprisoned, and another escaped three days after his return.

After a lawsuit for child custody prompted by the death of Shiloh resident Elma Hastings, the Children's Protective Society of Maine urged all minors to be removed from the community in 1920. Shortly after, Sandford encouraged his followers to work in mills and farms. This had the unplanned effect of emptying Shiloh and leaving Sandford with only a handful of followers. He announced his retirement and moved to Hobart, New York, where he died in obscurity in 1948.

The Shiloh complex became a small farming community of 10-20 people for the next fifty years. All of the buildings except for the Shiloh Chapel were torn down. Its congregation survived and continued to follow Sandford's teachings. In 1975 it was added to the National Register of Historic Places, and in 1998 the chapel officially left Sandborn's congregation, then known as 'The Kingdom Ministries,' reincorporating as an independent evangelical church serving the community of Durham.

Author Stephen King spent part of his childhood in Durham, and the Marsten House in his novel Salem's Lot is believed to be partially inspired by the Shiloh Chapel. King included a fictionalized version of the Shiloh church located near Castle Rock, Maine, in his stories The Body and Revival. In the latter book he incorporated his own memories of Shiloh during his time in Durham, writing:

Shiloh had changed a lot since Sandford's death (and is today little different from other Protestant groups), but in 1965, a flock of old rumors - fueled by the odd dress of its members and their stated belief that the end of the world was coming soon, like maybe next week - persisted.

== Description ==
The Shiloh building stands on a property overlooking the southern bank of the Androscoggin River, a few miles south of Lisbon Falls, off the north side of Shiloh Road. The surviving portion of the temple is a four-story structure, its ground floor a raised basement of brick, and the rest a frame structure with a mansarded roof. A seven-stage tower projects from the street-facing front, square in shape except for the crowning open circular belfry and cupola.

== See also ==
- National Register of Historic Places listings in Androscoggin County, Maine

A more complete history of Shiloh Temple
