= Jason Russell House =

Historic house in Massachusetts, United States

- U.S. National Register of Historic Places
- U.S. Historic district – Contributing property
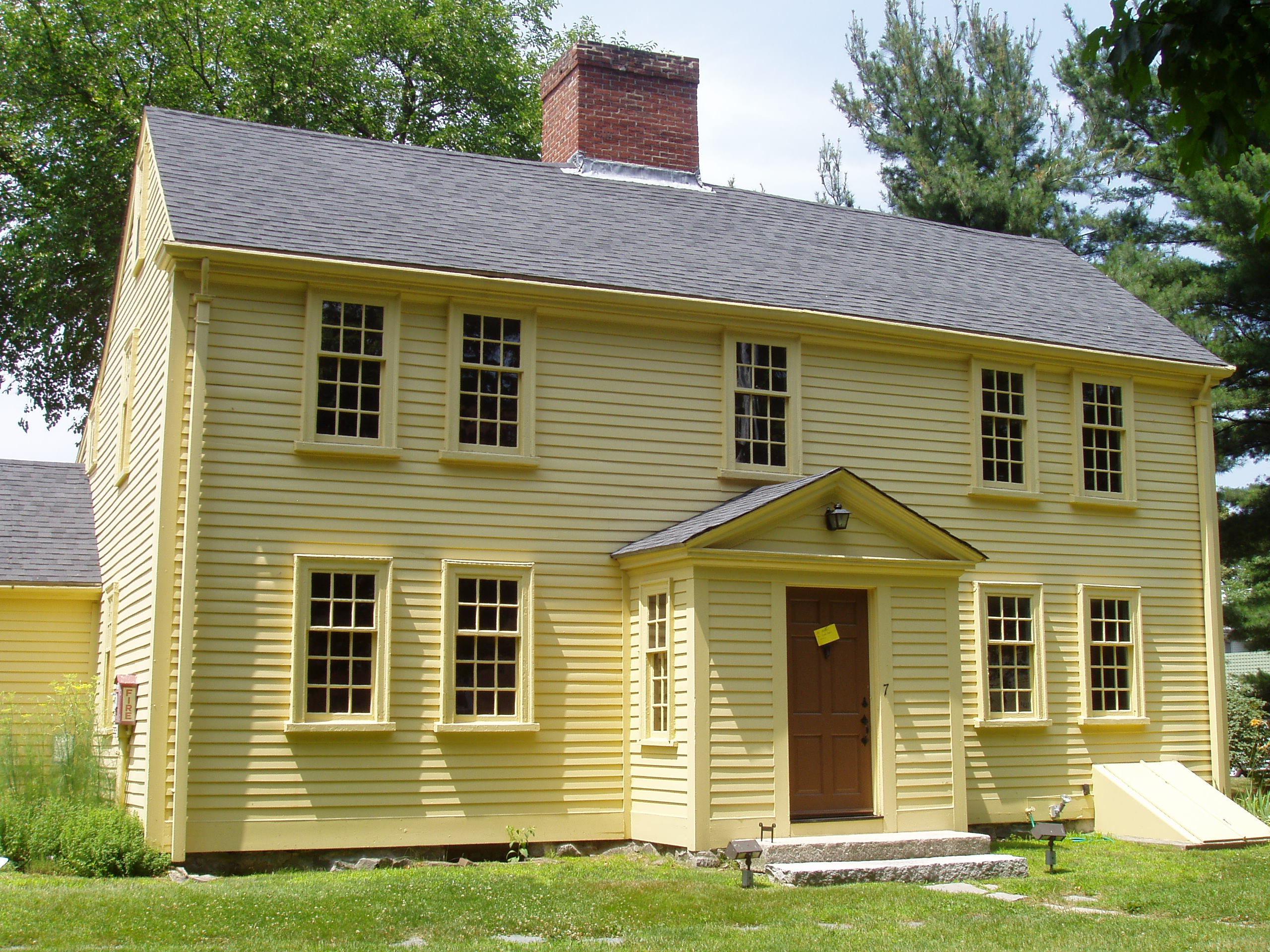
- The Jason Russell House
- Location: 7 Jason St. Arlington, Massachusetts
- Coordinates: 42°24′58″N 71°09′31″W
- Part of: Arlington Center Historic District (ID85002691)
- NRHP reference No.: 74000363

Significant dates
- Added to NRHP: October 9, 1974
- Designated CP: September 27, 1985

The Jason Russell House is a historic house in Arlington, Massachusetts, in and around which at least twenty-one colonial combatants died fighting on the first day of the American Revolutionary War, April 19, 1775 (the Battles of Lexington and Concord). The house was purchased in 1923 by the Arlington Historical Society which restored it in 1926 and now operates it as a museum.

== The Battle Site ==
In 1775, Jason Russell owned, among other properties, a farm of about 40 acres at the center of the Menotomy District of Cambridge, now part of the Town of Arlington. It was on that farm, on April 19 of that year, that the largest conflict of the day would occur between the Massachusetts provincial militia and the British Army as the latter returned from the Battles of Lexington and Concord

=== Acquisition of the Property ===
Jason's farm was located at the southwest corner of two main roads in Menotomy. The Concord Road (now known as Massachusetts Avenue) was the primary route connecting Boston with towns to the west, while the Watertown Road (now mostly Pleasant Street) offered access to Menotomy from the south.

In 1689, as soon as the Town of Cambridge allocated the land west of Menotomy Center as individual properties, Jason's grandfather purchased four lots on the south side of the Concord Road at its intersection with the Watertown Road. In 1699, by acquiring an additional parcel along the Watertown Road he expanded his land to a total of forty-one acres. He referred to these parcels as “The Great Pasture.”

The younger Jason’s father died when Jason was only ten, leaving him and his sister in the care of their grandparents. When the grandfather died without a will in 1736, and the grandmother shortly thereafter, a series of negotiations, augmented by the grandmother’s will, eventuated in probate agreements that left perhaps 28 acres to Jason and the remaining acreage to Jason’s aunt Martha Dunster and to Martha’s son, also named Jason. In October of 1744, Jason consolidated the farm property by selling twelve acres from the other side of the Concord Road to the Dunsters in exchange for their twelve acres abutting his own.

This completed the property as bounded in 1775, except that in 1740 the newly installed Pastor, the Rev. Samuel Cooke, purchased an acre of land along the Watertown Road from Jason near what is now Maple Street. The Rev. Cooke put a house and a barn on it; the barn may have figured in the battle described below.

Finally, in 1724, at the instigation of the grandfather and other neighbors, the town voted to move part of the Watertown Road “from the northerly to the southerly side of the land reserved for a burying place.” This removed the separation between Russell’s property and that of the burying-ground, so that it, and the associated Meeting House added in 1733, would become de facto extensions of the battleground of 1775.

=== Geology and Geography of the Site ===
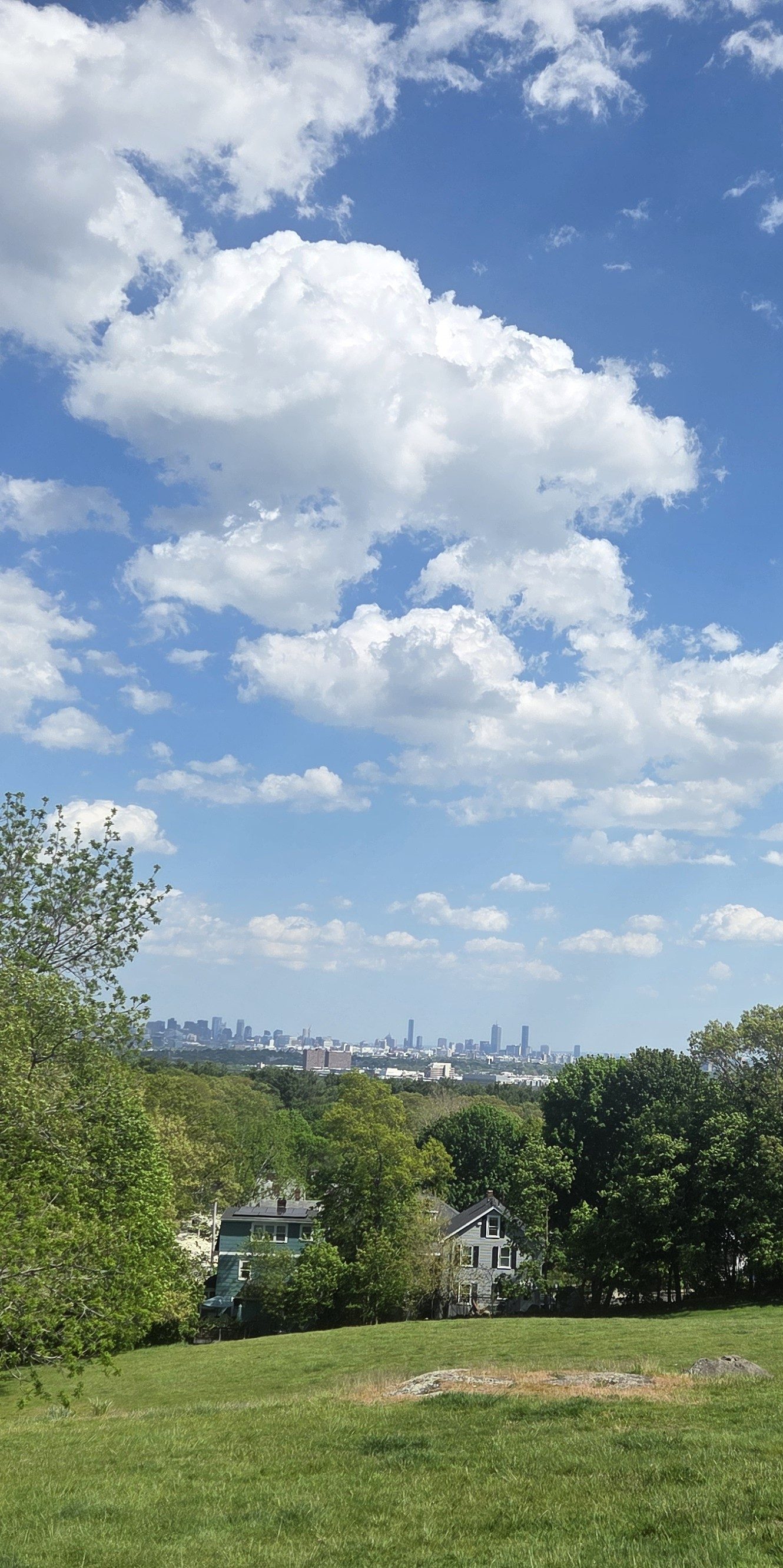
View over the Boston Basin as seen from the Robbins Farm Park in Arlington Heights

Why did such a major battle take place here rather than elsewhere? Because it lay at the intersection of the principal roads of the time, and secondly, because the hills west of Menotomy Center made it difficult for militias from towns to the north and south to intercept the retreating British Army any earlier.

A topographical map of the area shows that Arlington/Menotomy has two geographically distinct areas. The hills west of center are part of a volcanic mountain range that developed over 500 million years ago off the coast of what is now East Africa, then drifted over to slam into the North American coast. On the other hand, Arlington east of center lies in the Boston Basin, a rift valley that had formed in those mountains, largely filled in by glacial deposits over the last 100,000 years. The Watertown Road (today’s Pleasant Street) traverses a subduction fault marking the northern boundary of the Basin and separating Arlington into those two parts.

The Concord Road that passed by Russell’s farm traversed the Mill Brook Valley, which had developed over the years along another geologic feature called a “normal fault.” This cut through the normally steep northern escarpment of the Boston Basin, making it a natural passage from Boston to the towns further west such as Lexington and Concord, and so it was that Paul Revere, William Dawes, and the British Army passed by Russell’s house and farm on April 18 and 19th, 1775. Militias from the north and south, however, had to intersect the Concord Road along the Basin’s northern boundary, which brought them naturally to Russell’s farm.

=== The House ===
In 1745, according to family lore and a dendrochronology study, Jason Russell built a house at the western end of his 40 acres. He oriented it so that it faced east and a little south, giving it a view across the lower part of that parcel toward the Watertown Road on the other side.

The house is a typical New England farmhouse with five windows across the front, a front door and a stairway in the center and a large chimney in the middle of a pitched roof. The lower of two rooms on the south served as a kitchen, while the room above, still roughly finished, was perhaps a bedroom. The two on the north – a “best room” below and another bedroom above – had paneled fireplace walls and deeper window recesses.

Initially, Russell must have constructed the house without first excavating for a basement, as it was later found to have a large chuck of bedrock directly beneath the south side (and more) of the house. This limited (and limits) the size of the basement to part of the north side.

The dendrochronology study revealed that many of the timbers used in the house were made from lumber cut in 1684–85 or earlier and so may have been recycled from the house inherited from Jason’s grandfather, who had built a house around that time at the northwest corner of the Concord and Woburn Roads (the latter now known as Medford Street).

An unusual feature of the kitchen is its spotted ceiling, preserved and uncovered when the house was restored in the early 20th century. The ceiling had been left unplastered, then decorated with whitewash and black sponge painting.

Nylander also claimed in 1964 that after the house passed out of the family in 1896, “a subsequent owner moved it partly off its original foundation to install a furnace.” Bohy and Scott, however, assemble evidence that this was not so, including the age of the mortar between the foundation stones and the results of a ground-penetrating radar study, indicating that the house remains on its original foundation.

== April 19, 1775 ==
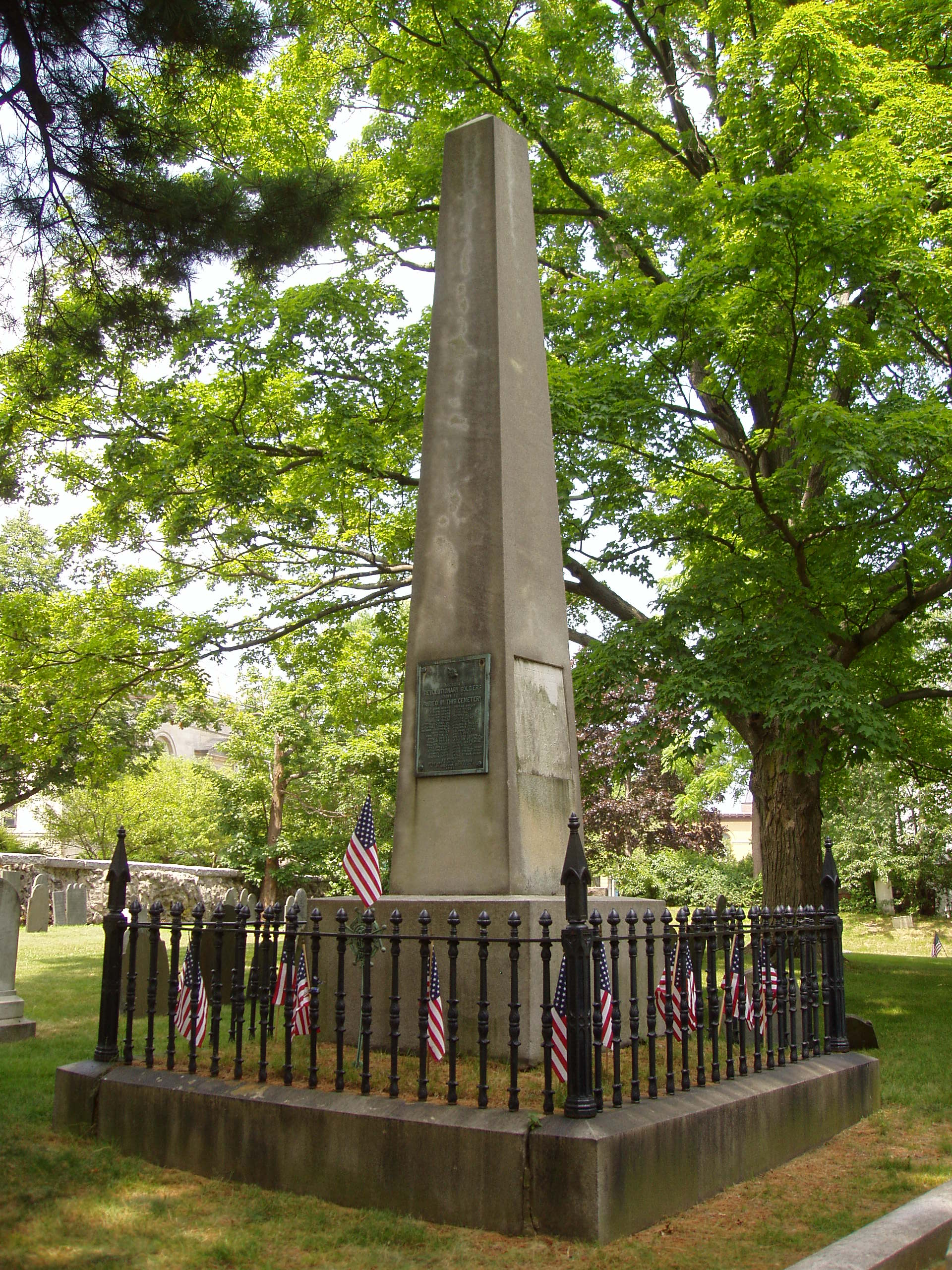
Monument in the Old Burying Ground, Arlington, Massachusetts, to twelve slain on April 19, 1775.

On April 19, 1775, the house and its surrounding yard were the site of one of the biggest conflicts of the first battle in the Revolutionary War, resulting in more colonial troop deaths than anywhere else along the battle road. As British troops marched back towards Boston, heavy fighting occurred along their route through then Menotomy (which in 1807 was renamed West Cambridge and in 1867 given its present name of Arlington). Houses along the way were ransacked and plundered by the retreating British. The running battle continued to Jason Russell's house, where Russell was joined by men from Beverly, Danvers, Lynn, Salem, Dedham, and Needham at his house.

The history of the Jason Russell House on April 19, 1775, is also the history of a family. Jason and Elizabeth Russell had raised six surviving children here. Three had married and moved to Mason, New Hampshire; a fourth, Thomas had established a grocery store across the street in 1773 and had married the following year. Remaining at home were Elizabeth (called Betsey by the family), who was 18, and Noah, who had just turned 12 the previous month.

But on that day the history of the house and yard became the history of a whole region as part of the Battle of Menotomy.

Around midnight of the night before, Paul Revere had ridden past the house on his mission to warn that the British regulars (soldiers) would be coming by on their way to Lexington and, ultimately, to Concord. About half an hour later William Dawes would pass by with the same message.

Around 3:30 in the morning about 700 British troops under the command of Lieutenant Col. Francis Smith would march “quietly” by.

=== The Troops Assemble ===
Meanwhile, the rides of Revere and Dawes triggered a flexible notification system (express riders as well as bells, drums, alarm guns, bonfires, and a trumpet) to let the towns within 25 miles of Boston know that a sizable body of Provincial troops was on the move. Accordingly, militias and minutemen companies from many outlying communities assembled and began marches that would eventually bring them to Jason Russell's property.

Needham dispatched three companies of militia comprising 185 men. Four of their men would never return home.

The men of Dedham appear to have responded with great fervor. They dispatched four companies of militia, one for each parish of the town, and one minuteman company under Captain Joseph Guild. Guild's men left in small groups as soon as enough had assembled to form a platoon. All together about 300 men left that day, reportedly leaving almost no men behind between the ages of 16 and 80.

Around 9 am troops began to assemble in Danvers, including the part that is now Peabody, comprising two companies of minutemen under Israel Hutchinson and Gideon Foster as well as three militias under Samuel Flint, Samuel Eppes, and Jeremiah Page. These left at different times and via different routes but all arrived in Menotomy about the same time. One body of minutemen had gathered at the Bell Tavern, at the corner of what is now Main and Washington in Peabody. Setting out at 10, they covered 16 miles in 4 hours, to arrive in Menotomy by early afternoon. The Town of Beverly contributed three companies of militia, some of whom were trained as minutemen; in addition, 19 men from Beverly mustered together with Hutchinson's minutemen. In all, perhaps 300 men assembled from just Danvers, Peabody, and Beverly.

Around noon or so, Jason Russell, who was “old” (59) and lame, started bringing his family up to the George Prentiss house, beyond the ridge of the hill behind the house, where they could be safe with others. But partway up, he let the family go on alone and returned “to look after things at home.” On his arrival, provincial militias were already stationing themselves around the house. From bundles of shingles that were lying about, because Jason had been preparing to reshingle, he and some provincial militias formed a barricade behind his gate, thinking this would be a good position from which to fire on the enemy as they returned.

Some men from Danvers went into a “walled enclosure” and reinforced that protection with additional shingles. Other troops stationed themselves among the trees on the property, such as those in the orchard on the slope behind (on the south side of) the house. Danvers's Gideon Foster, having been warned by the more experienced Hutchinson of the possibility of a flanking attack, also set up among the trees rather than behind barricades. Several units from Dedham, Needham, and Lynn took up positions behind a stone wall that stretched uphill behind Jason Russell's house.

Jason and the provincial militias positioned themselves somewhat back from the road itself. As Lord Percy said later, only the most daring would have approached "within 10 yards to fire at me and other officers." At that time, a little west of Russell's house, the road traversed a hilly area that obscured the provincials’ view of the approaching armies – as well as the armies' view of the provincials.

=== The Battle ===
“Unfortunately, Jason Russell and the others had made one great miscalculation....” Around four o'clock the British left the Foot of the Rocks, about a mile up the road, and while the main column was coming by the main road, flanking parties were also advancing on both sides. The provincials had not counted on the flanking parties.

For the colonials, this would be a battle unlike almost any other. Theirs was not an army (or armies) under a single commanding officer; rather, their troops were made up of a number of independent provincial militias and companies of minutemen, together with a number of individuals not listed as mustering among the participating units. The provincials were united in purpose, but lacked formal coordination in action, especially under the surprise of the flanking troops. As Lord Percy wrote back to London the following day, “During the whole [retreat] the Rebels attacked us in a very scattered, irregular manner, but with purpose and resolution, nor did they ever dare to form into any regular body.” The stories we have are therefore rather of engagements of individuals or of small numbers of people. Some of these happen in or around Jason Russell's House, but the site of other actions is merely somewhere in the 300 yards or so between the house and the Meeting House to the east; timing and sequence are equally uncertain.

While the flanking troops were still on their way, Ammi Cutter, Jason's neighbor from across the mill brook on the north side of the road, spotted Russell among the militias, crossed over the road and begged Jason to go to a safer spot. But Jason replied, “An Englishman's home is his castle,” and stayed with the waiting ambush. As Cutter returned across the hollow, the north side flanking party spotted him and took pot shots at him. He managed to reach the old mill, where he tripped and fell among some logs, with bullets sending chips of bark all around him. Fortunately, the flanking party left him for dead and passed on.

Meanwhile, the southside flankers came upon the provincials stationed on the slope that rose south of the house. Jotham Webb, a minuteman serving under Danvers's Colonel Hutchinson, was “shot through the body and killed by the first fire.” Abednego Ramsdell of Lynn also "fell immediately”. Reuben Kennison, from Beverly, also serving with Hutchinson's company, was felled by British musket balls and bayoneted to boot.

Elias Haven was standing with his brother-in-law, Aaron Whiting, near the Meeting House, when Elias was shot and killed by a British soldier. Haven and Whiting, both from the part of Dedham that later became Dover, were part of Ebenezer Battle's militia company.

Two friends, Daniel Townsend and Timothy Munroe, who were from the part of Lynn that became Lynnfield, were standing in the yard behind the house, firing at the British troops. Then, according to Lewis and Newhall,

"Townsend had just fired, and exclaimed, 'There is another redcoat down,' when Munroe, looking round, saw, to his astonishment, that they were completely hemmed in by the flank guard of the British army, who were coming down through the fields behind them. They immediately ran into the house, and sought for the cellar; but no cellar was there. They looked for a closet, but there was none. All this time, which was indeed but a moment, the balls were pouring through the back windows, making havoc of the glass. Townsend leaped through the end window, carrying the sash and all with him, and instantly fell dead. Munroe followed, and ran for his life. He passed for a long distance between the parties, many of whom discharged their guns at him. As he passed the last soldier, who stopped to fire, he heard the redcoat exclaim, 'Damn the Yankee! He is bullet proof – let him go!' Mr. Munroe had one ball through his leg, and thirty-two bullet holes through his clothes and hat. Even the metal buttons of his waistcoat were shot off."

And it was not just the window fragments that did Townsend in; he had also been shot through with seven bullets.

Lieut. John Bacon of Needham was positioned behind a stone wall, next to a veteran nicknamed “Old Hawes,” when Hawes exclaimed “Run, or you are dead; here's the side guard.” Bacon tried to clamber over the wall, but was shot through near the third button on his vest – and was later found laid out with the others inside the house.

The men in the enclosure were unaware of the flankers as they began to fire at the advancing main column. One who survived, Samuel Page, later told of how, after he had snapped his wooden ramrod as he was driving a cartridge into his gun, he had turned to his neighbor Perley Putnam to ask to borrow his, only to see Putnam shot dead by a ball from the British rear guard. What followed was a struggle in which some escaped unharmed, but the British managed to capture and then execute three or four.

As the flankers closed in, Jason Russell and a number of other troops rushed to take refuge in the house. It is said that, because Russell was old and lame, he was in the rear and was felled by two bullets at his own doorstep, then received "eleven bayonet stabs from the exasperated enemy as they passed in and out."

Eight of the colonials who did manage to find their way into the house – a combination of men from Danvers, Beverly, and Lynn – also managed to find their way to the basement. They were safe there (at least for the time being), as any redcoat who tried to open the basement door and come down could easily be shot himself, and one did yield his life in the attempt. Another British regular was shot and killed elsewhere on the premises.

Three men from the now-Peabody part of Danvers – George Southwick, Joseph Bell, and Dennison Wallis – managed to find their way upstairs. Sensing a lull, they then ventured down the stairs with Southwick in the lead, till suddenly the outside door was flung open to admit British soldiers. The outcome was gruesome; the first soldier killed Southwick by slashing him across the head.

Joseph Bell was taken prisoner and spent the next two months of his life aboard a British frigate, being returned in a prisoner swap the following June 6.

Dennison Wallis also surrendered and was relieved of his watch and wallet. But then Wallis saw the British killing other prisoners, the ones from the enclosure, and took off running. He received twelve or thirteen bullets in the attempt and finally fell beside a wall that he was trying to jump over. Fortunately, the British left him for dead, and he lived to tell the tale.

But a British officer would later describe some events of that day—events that may well have occurred at Jason's house—in this way:

“In another house which was long defended by eight resolute fellows, the grenadiers at last got possession, when after having run their bayonets into seven, the eighth continued to abuse them with all the [beastlike rage] of a true Cromwellian, and but a moment before he quitted this world applied such epithets as I must leave unmentioned"

Such a bloodletting would be consistent with the copious amounts of blood that surrounded the bodies at the end of the day.

And a little later, an unnamed British officer, evidently tasked with making sure that the captured houses were secure, fought his way into the house and “counted 11 Yankies dead in it & the orchard.”

More fortunate were the troops positioned near Gideon Foster. When they found themselves nearly surrounded, Foster led them down the hill, along the margin of a pond (probably Spy Pond, lying to the east of Jason's property), and across the road in front of the advancing British column, finally finding a safe position behind a ditch wall on the north. From there, they continued firing at the retreating British until the column passed beyond reach. Foster himself believed that he fired as many as eleven times with two balls each that day.

Meanwhile, the East Company of militia from Needham arrived, apparently as the battle was already in progress. On hearing of the “Lexington Alarm” that morning, they had gathered in the driveway of the local minister, where their ammunition was being stored. He “addressed them earnestly, and gave his blessing,” and they started on their way around 10 am. After a lunch break in Watertown, they arrived at Menotomy, but “being ignorant of what are called flank guards, they inserted themselves between them and the main body of the British troops.” Since they would have been coming from the South along the Watertown Road (now Pleasant Street in Arlington), they must have arrived at or near the east end of Jason's property.

Several men from the East Company took refuge in a barn. Among them, Sergeant Elisha Mills stepped out, got off one shot at the flank guard, then died pierced by six musket balls. His comrade, Jonathan Parker, on being discovered there by the flank guard, made a run for it, but died trying to reach the woods.

=== Aftermath ===
==== Returning the Casualties to Their Homes ====
After the fighting was over, Timothy Munroe, who had escaped by following his companion Daniel Townsend through the south window, returned to claim his friend's body, and joined Townsend's brother and others in returning the body to Lynn End (later Lynnfield) that same night.

Townsend and his wife Zerviah had been married just over eleven years, and he left behind five small children. Zerviah never recovered from the shock and died the following October. A historical marker now rests at the site of their one-time home. Munroe kept his own bullet-riddled clothes as a souvenir until he tired of showing them.

That night of the 19th the men of Danvers (including what is now Peabody) gathered their slain and retired to Medford, the town next door to Menotomy, for the night. They sent John Sawyer back to Danvers with the news of the day. A number of women were gathered in the New Mills section. Among them Lydia Webb, who had married Jotham only days earlier, thus learned from Sawyer's report that she had that day become a widow.

The next morning, learning that the British had all returned to Boston, the Danvers men gathered up their slain and brought them back to town by ox-cart. They were met by the townspeople, and the sexton of the south parish drove four of them to the home of Samuel Cook, Sr. on Central Street in what is now Peabody. These four were Samuel Cook, Jr., George Southwick, Henry Jacobs, Jr., and Ebenezer Goldthwait.

The other three belonged to Capt. Hutchinson's company and were brought in the evening of that day to their captain's home in Danversport. Their names were Benjamin Daland, Jr., Perley Putnam, and Jotham Webb.

Also on the 20th, the body of Reuben Kenisson was returned to the Ryal Side neighborhood of Beverly to be buried in a plot next to the farm where he had been living and working with his wife Apphia; they had been married for less than a year. Apphia later remarried, but when she died in 1842 at the age of 89, she still had in her possession the shirt that Reuben had been wearing on April 19, 1775.

Elisha Mills was the only one slain that day from Needham who returned to his home. His neighbor, Aaron Smith, brought Elisha's body home by ox cart on the 20th. As it happened, Aaron then married Elisha's widow, Deborah, in September of the following year.

==== The Bodies on the Floor ====
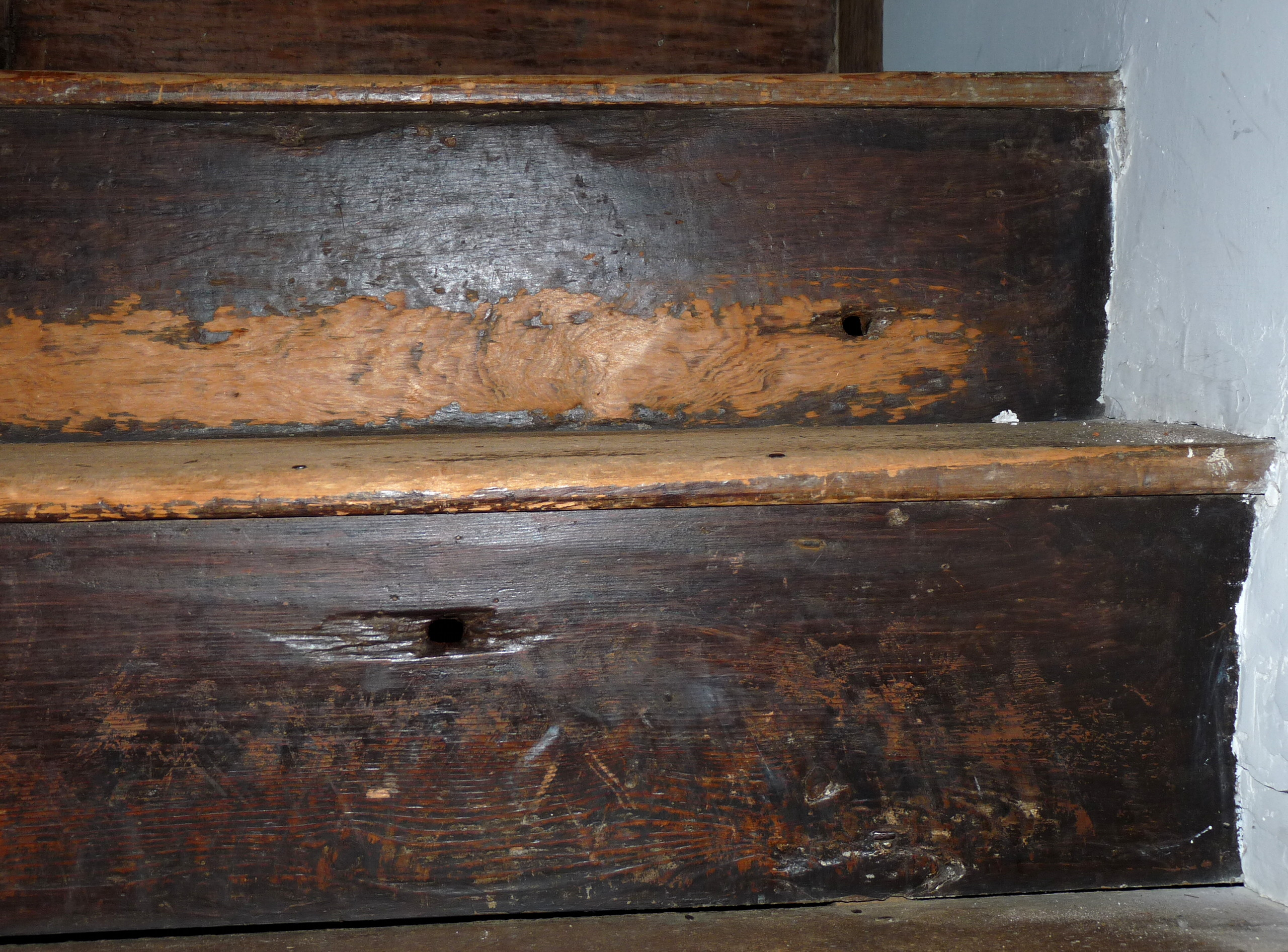
Bullet holes in the main staircase of the house are still visible.

After the fighting had ceased for the day, people gathered colonial bodies from all over the area – evidently those that had not (yet) been claimed by their comrades for return to their homes – and deposited them on the floor of the Russell family's kitchen, adding to the mess that was already there. Speaking in 1864, Samuel Smith reported that "when Mrs. Russell came back to her home she found them there, weltering in their own blood, her husband and eleven others. She said that the blood in the room was almost ankle deep. The house itself was riddled with bullets, and the marks of them in many places are still visible. The same blood-stained floor remained on that room till a year ago" - that is, until 1863.

Smith reported that the bodies were buried in haste, at least for the time being:

“In the consternation and fear of that hour, the dead were placed on a sled, and drawn by a yoke of oxen upon the bare ground to the grave-yard. A single grave was hastily dug, and the twelve were laid in it side by side, “head to point,” with their clothes on just as they fell.”

A story passed down to John Bacon's great-grandson emphasizes how quickly the twelve were buried, and notes that the men's outer clothes must have been saved off before the burial:

“Immediately on receiving the news my grandfather (son of Lieut. Bacon) went off to see how it was, and near night, April 20, came home with his clothes, the body having been buried at West Cambridge. The clothes were found in the school-house, and the moment grandfather entered the room he knew the old striped hat which was put on top of the roll of clothes.”

At the time of the burials, the townspeople knew the names only of Jason himself and those of Jabez Wyman and Jacob Winship. The latter two, also from Menotomy, were not combatants, but "were most barbarously killed and mutilated" down the road at Cooper's Tavern, and were evidently collected with the others after the fighting had ceased.

The remaining nine bodies were not formally identified until the end of the 19th Century, and later commentators apparently thought them to have been killed inside or at least at the Jason Russell House. However, matching the nine names with reports of their deaths indicates that most of them were in fact killed outside the house or elsewhere.

Name	Home Town	Where Killed
Jason Russell	Menotomy	His front doorstep
Jabez Wyman	Menotomy	Cooper's Tavern
Jacob Winship	Menotomy	Cooper's Tavern
Lieut. John Bacon	Needham	Clambering over a wall
Amos Mills	Needham	Near the Meeting House
Jonathan Parker	Needham	Running from a barn towards the woods
Nathaniel ("Nathan") Chamberlain	Needham	Near the Meeting House
William Flint	Lynn	Unspecified
Thomas Hadley	Lynn	Unspecified
Abednego Ramsdell	Lynn	Killed from behind by a flank guard
Elias Haven, Sr.	Dedham	Near the Meeting House
Benjamin Pierce	Salem	Between Jason Russell's house and the Meeting House

The bodies of some who had actually died in the house, such as that of George Southwick, must have been reclaimed by their comrades before these twelve were interred.

A plain obelisk of New Hampshire granite was later raised above the grave. The inscription on the monument reads:

"Erected by the Inhabitants of West Cambridge, A.D. 1848, over the common grave of Jason Russell, Jason Winship, Jabez Wyman and nine others, who were slain in this town by the British Troops on their retreat from the Battles of Lexington and Concord, April 19, 1775. Being among the first to lay down their lives in the struggle for American Independence."

==== Russell Family ====
On the very day of the battle, Jason's son Thomas and his wife Anna had their first daughter, also named Anna – Jason and Elizabeth's granddaughter. Baby Anna was baptized on the following Sunday, the 23rd, but unfortunately died soon after.

Jason Russell's estate was settled in 1776. His house and 117 acres of land were divided between Noah, his only son left at home, and his widow, Elizabeth. She received the 17 acres the house was standing on together with half the house, "Libberty to ues [sic] the oven when wanted" and additional privileges of use, including space in the barn. Noah received the other half of the house, half the barn and some lands. Other children got other parts of the estate. Elizabeth Russell lived in her northerly rooms until the eleventh of August 1786 when she died aged 65.

On July 4, 2025, actor Kurt Russell and his son Boston Russell visited the Jason Russell House as part of the Arlington 250th anniversary celebrations. Boston Russell and his brother Wyatt had been doing genealogical research and discovered Jason Russell was Kurt Russell's 6th great-grandfather.

== See also ==
- Arlington Historical Society, "Architectural History", retrieved June 10, 2025, provides a more thorough description of the design and structure of the house since its construction.
- Battle of Menotomy
- Beverly and the Battles of Lexington and Concord April 18-19, 1775
- Danvers and the Battles of Lexington and Concord April 18-19, 1775
- Dedham, Massachusetts in the American Revolution, Article "Revolutionary War: Battles at Lexington and Concord"
- Needham and the Battles of Lexington and Concord April 18-19, 1775
- Peabody Historical Society and Museum, "Peabody and the American Revolution," retrieved July 21, 2025
- National Register of Historic Places listings in Arlington, Massachusetts
