= Frank Sandford =

American religious leader

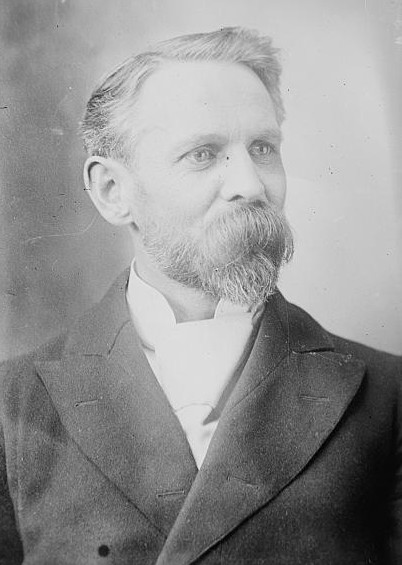
- Frank Sandford in 1909
- Born: Frank Weston Sandford; October 2, 1862; Bowdoinham, Maine, U.S.
- Died: March 4, 1948 (aged 85); Hobart, New York, U.S.
- Resting place: Hobart, New York, U.S.
- Other name: F. W. Sandford
- Occupations: Religious leader, preacher, founder of the Kingdom
- Spouse: Helen Kinney Sandford
- Criminal charges: Manslaughter, cruelty to children
- Penalty: 7-year sentence in Atlanta U.S. Penitentiary

Frank Weston Sandford (October 2, 1862 – March 4, 1948) was a charismatic Christian religious leader in the United States who attained notoriety as the founder and leader of an apocalyptic sect known as "The Kingdom".

After performing an exorcism and claiming to hear the voice of God warn him of "Armageddon", he established a commune called the "Shiloh" in Durham, Maine. Commune members were forced to fast, pray for hours-on-end and obey Sandford's orders absolutely. After commune members disagreed about his biblical interpretations, he instituted a chain-of-command in which his orders were limited by only by those of God and Jesus Christ. Eventually he declared himself the incarnation of the prophet Elijah and King David, and established "The Kingdom."

Considered by many to be an autocrat who insisted on unquestioning loyalty, Sandford regularly starved his followers, which resulted in deadly outbreaks of smallpox, diphtheria, and other infectious diseases. The death of 14-year-old Leander Bartlett lead to his conviction for manslaughter and cruelty to children in 1904, though the convictions were reversed the following year. Sandford then began leading missionary sea voyages. In 1911, he knowingly sailed from Africa to Greenland with insufficient food and supplies, causing six crew members to be stricken with scurvy and die on his return to Portland.

Sandford was detained by authorities and sentenced to seven years in prison. In 1918, Sandford was released on good behavior and returned to the "Shiloh", resuming his responsibilities as leader. Two years later, the death of another commune member led his sect to be forcibly dispersed in what he called "the Scattering". After the commune was evacuated by law, Sandford moved to New York's Catskill Mountains. On March 4, 1948, Sandford died and his body was secretly buried by his followers. His sect survives, in attenuated form, into the 21st century with the creation of the Kingdom Christian Ministries in 1998.

== Early life ==
Frank Sandford was born in Bowdoinham, Maine, the tenth child of a farming family. An early companion recalled young Sandford as a natural leader, stating that he was always the one who "drove the horse and steered the boat"; if they played ball, "he was always a captain." Sandford's father died when he was age 14, and by age 16 he was teaching school during an era in which physical prowess was often necessary to establish classroom discipline.

During his second year of teaching, Sandford reluctantly attended a revival meeting at his mother's Free Will Baptist church and was converted on February 29, 1880. He threw away his tobacco and announced his conversion publicly, not only at church but also at Nichols Latin School, where worldly cosmopolitanism was the preferred pose.

Entering Bates College on a general scholarship, Sandford was elected class president and served as both coach and catcher of the baseball team. He graduated in 1886 with honors and was chosen to give a commencement address. For one summer Sandford captained a semi-pro baseball team and was approached by professional scouts. After a teammate ridiculed him for attending church during Maine's Fast Day, he returned to Bates to attend Cobb Divinity School.

Frustrated by the seminary's mixture of formalism and religious modernism, Sandford later said that God had addressed him directly with words from the gospel of Matthew: "Blessed are they that hunger and thirst after righteousness, for they shall be filled." For the rest of his life he distrusted academic religion. Soon thereafter, at age 24, Sandford dropped out of seminary after he was called as pastor by the Free Will Baptist church in Topsham, Maine. He was frenetically energetic, and within three years his revivals resulted in three hundred conversions and more than a hundred baptisms. Besides serving as pastor, he became principal of the Topsham schools and organized sports programs for both local children and workers at a paper mill.

=== Early travels ===
Beginning in 1887, Sandford's religious views changed dramatically. In July, he attended Dwight L. Moody’s "College of Colleges" at Northfield Mount Hermon School in Northfield, Massachusetts, the second annual meeting of the Student Volunteer Movement. The college men who attended represented a revival of interest in foreign missions among more privileged Americans. Moody himself provided Sandford with three key religious concepts: personal holiness, living by faith, and informal preaching. Shortly thereafter, Sandford read Hannah Whitall Smith's The Christian's Secret of a Happy Life (1875). Smith was an exponent of "higher life" Christianity; but what most attracted Sandford was her "emphasis on action, on a life that acts on faith, that obeys by doing."

Later that fall, Sandford was present for a religious conference that featured the Rev. A. B. Simpson, who had come to Maine specifically to organize the Christian and Missionary Alliance. Simpson's ministry emphasized not only missions and deeper life holiness but also faith healing. It was at this conference that Sandford met Helen Kinney, the daughter of a wealthy cotton broker, who had surrendered a career in art to become a foreign missionary. The following year, in the summer of 1888, Sandford attended the Niagara Bible Conference, which emphasized the imminent, premillennial return of Jesus Christ.

These diverse, yet related, strands of late 19th-century evangelicalism came together for Sandford after he accepted the pastorate of a more affluent Free Will Baptist church in Somersworth, New Hampshire. Following a period of emotional depression—perhaps a nervous breakdown—he was temporarily released by his church after the denomination invited him and another young minister to travel around the world. Sandford visited Japan, China, India, and the Ottoman Empire. In China he toured the China Inland Mission of Hudson Taylor, where he noted with admiration that "all depend upon God for support and divide their supplies equally"—a model for his own Shiloh. Visiting the Holy Land, he developed a lifelong passion for more knowledge about it, but he nearly died when his steamer sank off Jaffa.

=== Pre-Shiloh activities ===
After Sandford's return to the United States, the pastorate seemed tame, his congregation narrow-minded. In August 1891, Sandford had two strange experiences: he tentatively, but (at least according to his own testimony) successfully, cast demons out of a friend; and the following morning, he heard whispered in the trees the single word: "Armageddon." Shortly thereafter, Sandford convinced Kinney, whom he had met again as a missionary in Japan, to marry him. When he suggested leaving the pastorate and preaching the gospel without visible support, she replied, "I think it would be lovely."

On New Year's Day, 1893, Sandford told his church that God had told him, "Go." He resigned his pulpit and gave away his savings in the teeth of an economic panic and depression. Sandford and his wife then began holding meetings in rural Maine—at the beginning with virtually no congregations and no financial support. Eventually he achieved some success among people in Maine's coastal hill regions and contributions came in plentifully, although Sandford did not solicit money or even pass a collection plate.

By the fall of 1894, Sandford believed that he no longer bore responsibility for his actions, that he need only respond to the movings of the Holy Spirit. Thus abandoning the Free Will Baptists, he began to issue a monthly magazine, Tongues of Fire from the World's Evangelization Crusade on Apostolic Principles, in which he advertised for other workers to join him in his ministry. A year later, with a small but committed following of young people, Sandford announced the opening of a school, soon given the name "Holy Ghost and Us Bible School." The school charged no tuition, offered no courses, and had no teachers except Sandford himself and no textbooks except the Bible.

== Religious leadership ==
=== Shiloh ===
In 1896, Sandford became convinced that God had told him to build a home for the Bible school on a sandy hill near Durham, Maine. Despite having only three cents in his pocket, he kept faith that God would provide the means of putting up a building without his explicitly asking for money. Although Sandford eventually decided that publishing a list of needs in his Tongues of Fire would be acceptable, the manner in which the money and volunteer labor was provided by supporters was nearly miraculous in any case. Sandford had intended to name only the school's main building "Shiloh" (after a place in the Bible), but the name "Shiloh" was found to be more mellifluous than "The Holy Ghost and Us" and thus became the informal name of his movement.

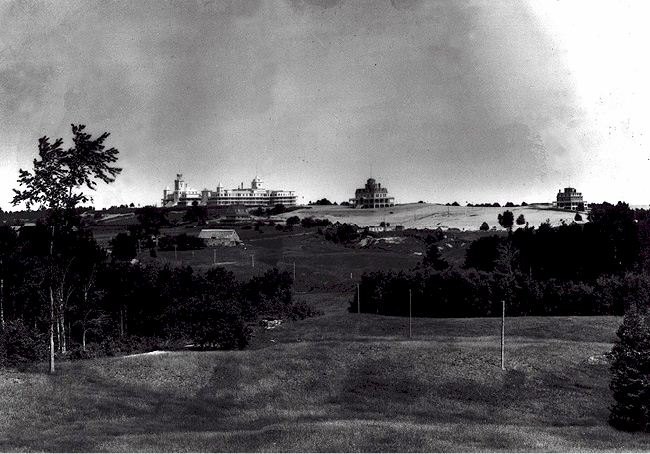
Shiloh (c. 1901)

At its height, the Shiloh had more than six hundred residents who attempted to "live in the supernatural." None worked for pay, and all depended on God to supply their material needs. To live at Shiloh meant to "be in a constant state of readiness for the 'Holy Spirit's latest,' as Sandford put it. This meant no settling into ruts of any kind. It meant being ready to do any job, especially those you were least adept at....It meant being open to last-minute changes in schedule." What little schedule there was consisted of one or two hours of private devotions in the morning, breakfast and kitchen chores, prayer at 9:00am, classes until noon, and lunch before personal household or office duties. The schedule might be interrupted at any moment by some special request for prayer; "God's work could not be crammed into a human schedule, and fussy ideas about order were not appropriate."

==== Theological development ====
Except for celebrating Jewish Feasts and keeping the Sabbath on Saturday, Sandford's theology was, at this point, not far from mainstream evangelicalism. Nevertheless, because he believed that Thursday was the day on which Jesus was crucified, he and his followers prayed for six hours (from 9:00am to 3:00pm) on that day. In the summer of 1896, Sandford publicly discussed the two witnesses mentioned in the Book of Revelation who would appear before Christ's Second Coming, and he declared that his school would "stand by and if need be die" with them. When Sandford's son John was born shortly after the dedication of Shiloh, he said that (like John the Baptist), the boy had been "filled with the Holy Ghost even from his mother's womb."

==== British Israelism ====
By 1898, Sandford had found additional spiritual and material support among Higher Life Christians in Boston and London, and he concluded that God now wanted him to establish an outpost in Ottoman-controlled Palestine. Visiting Jerusalem for the first time, he dashed off a paper announcing that the Ten Lost Tribes were England and the U.S., blood descendants of the ancient Hebrews who had been carried into captivity by the Assyrians in 721 BC. British Israelism was a religious version of ideas about Anglo-Saxon supremacy that were common to the contemporary English-speaking world, and the doctrine made the Bible all the more relevant because its prophecies seemed to apply to the people of Shiloh and the nation of which it was a part.

==== Divine healing ====
By the early 20th century, the doctrine of divine healing had become an important part of Sandford's teaching. Initially skeptical, he resolved to “preach that part of the Bible” after attending an 1887 meeting where A. B. Simpson had spoken on the subject. In 1897, Sandford had witnessed and praised the miracles of contemporary faith healer John Alexander Dowie. Soon Tongues of Fire reported healings of pneumonia, cancer, diphtheria, catarrh, "sick headache," sprained wrist, dropsy, typhoid, mental derangement, broken bones, and "utter exhaustion." A local three-year-old girl who had been pronounced permanently blind by medical authorities suddenly regained her sight after prayer was offered for her at Shiloh. But the most spectacular case was the "resurrection" of Olive Mills, who had been seriously ill, perhaps with spinal meningitis. Told Mills was dead, Sandford found her without breath or pulse. In desperation he shouted, "Olive Mills! Come back! In the name of Jesus of Nazareth, come back!" Almost immediately, Mills opened her eyes, and within a few hours she was out of bed and dressed.

Sandford believed the Epistle of James compelled Christians who were sick to call church elders for prayer and the laying on of hands, and he criticised Christians who sought treatment from physicians. He believed that illness might be the result of either discipline from God or an attack of Satan; but casting out demons required “prevailing prayer,” an exercise that included such protracted fervency and shouting that one skeptic became apprehensive as what sounded “like a hundred people talking at once” concluded with a woman’s screams piercing the din. In 1899, Sandford received a divine message to complete a hospital in a hasty building drive—a technique frequently employed at Shiloh—but it was a hospital in which doctors were permitted only for diagnoses and consultations. No medicines of any kind were provided.

Among those influenced by these early developments at Shiloh were A. J. Tomlinson, founder of the Church of God; and Charles Fox Parham, one of the founders of the Pentecostal movement.

==== Acting for God ====
By the end of the century, Sandford became convinced "that as the passive agent of God's will, he could require exact and total obedience." Furthermore, as Hiss has written, to skeptics "Sandford's language vibrated with blasphemy, for in describing his own prayers as God's actions, he seemed to regard himself as having divine powers."

Inevitably, Sandford encountered opposition. A brief follower published an exposé, Sanfordism Exposed, and relatives of converts who wished to deed their property to Shiloh tried to have them declared insane. Although the town of Durham benefited from levying taxes on the residential portions of Shiloh, they also feared that block voting by Shiloh residents might dominate the town meeting, the school board, or the board of selectmen or that, in the event of bankruptcy, its members might become dependent on town charity.

More serious threats arose from among Sandford's own followers. The movement claimed to follow the leading of the Holy Spirit, but conflict developed when members disagreed about where the Holy Spirit was leading. In September 1900, Sandford announced that there would henceforth be an official chain of authority: God the Father, God the Son, the prophet whom God had chosen, ordained ministers subordinate to the prophet, everyone else subordinate to the ministers, with women and children also subordinate to their husbands and fathers. He then instituted an organized purge of members that "incorporated not just confession, but long day and night sessions of open and unrelenting criticism of each other. One's capacity to accept that scouring in a contrite and cooperative spirit, without resentment or defensiveness, was the first step in passing the grade." One by one, individuals were then brought before Sandford himself for final scrutiny by "the seven eyes of God."

Sandford also developed a three-tiered membership in his religious system: those willing to be "100-fold warriors" would be supported by 60- and 30-fold members who would live in their own homes and continue to work. In 1901, to make a clean break with the past, he instituted closed communion and rebaptized all local members of Shiloh in the nearby Androscoggin River.

==== Identification with Elijah and David ====
Shortly thereafter, Sandford announced that God had spoken three words to him "like a thunderbolt": "Elijah is Here!" And it was as Elijah that Sandford now called down God's judgment on "every lying pen," editors who had written critically "about this man of God." As usual, Sandford was also making an eschatological reference: he believed that, as Elijah, he would be one of the two witnesses of Revelation 11, who would be martyred and rise from the dead in Jerusalem before the coming of Christ's kingdom. The "Elijah" announcement was met with increased ridicule from the press and led to the breaking of all ties with followers of Moody and Simpson.

In 1902, after once again visiting Jerusalem, Sandford received a divine message that indicated that in some way, he was also the biblical David. He had a portrait of himself printed encircled by the words "David careth for the Sheep," and he immediately renamed his movement "The Kingdom."

=== Manslaughter trial ===
Sandford returned to Maine to find his community at what he considered a low spiritual ebb, with many members ill from diseases including smallpox. Peers were encouraged to closely examine each other's lives for sin, and parents regularly whipped children, a practice Sandford apparently condoned as the "schoolmaster to bring them to Christ." In January 1903, Sandford instituted a "Ninevah Fast", forbidding all food or liquid for thirty-six hours even for infants, animals, and the sick. During that period, fourteen-year-old Leander Bartlett, who had confessed to the most serious sin of planning to run away from Shiloh, died of diphtheria. When Sandford's own six-year-old son, John, disobeyed him, Sandford ordered him to fast without food or water until he declared himself glad to be whipped. A prominent defector from the sect, Nathan Harriman, publicized John’s treatment and declared Sandford’s hold over the people of Shiloh a kind of hypnotism, in which God's requirements were "identical with those of Sandford.”

Many local residents took a dim view of Sandford, and newspapers engaged in "long-running campaigns against Shiloh." One editor denounced the commune as "a damnable institution, a hell upon earth and the worst blot that ever disgraced the fair pages of Maine's history." In January 1904, Sandford was indicted by Androscoggin County on charges of cruelty to children and manslaughter—cruelty in the case of his son and manslaughter for his role in Bartlett's death. A jury convicted Sandford on the cruelty charge but was hung on the charge of manslaughter. On appeal, the verdict in the cruelty case was upheld; and at retrial, Sandford was convicted of manslaughter.

In 1905, the Maine Supreme Court reversed the manslaughter conviction because the trial judge had required jurors to make a decision based on their own belief about the "efficacy of prayer as a means to cure the sick." Another jury trial resulted in another hung jury. Meanwhile, Sandford had his followers sign a ten-foot scroll called the "Pledge of Loyalty," which included among its articles of faith a statement that "F. W. Sandford of Shiloh, Maine, U.S.A." was Elijah and David, and that "I believe in and accept him as such."

=== Circumnavigation on the Coronet ===
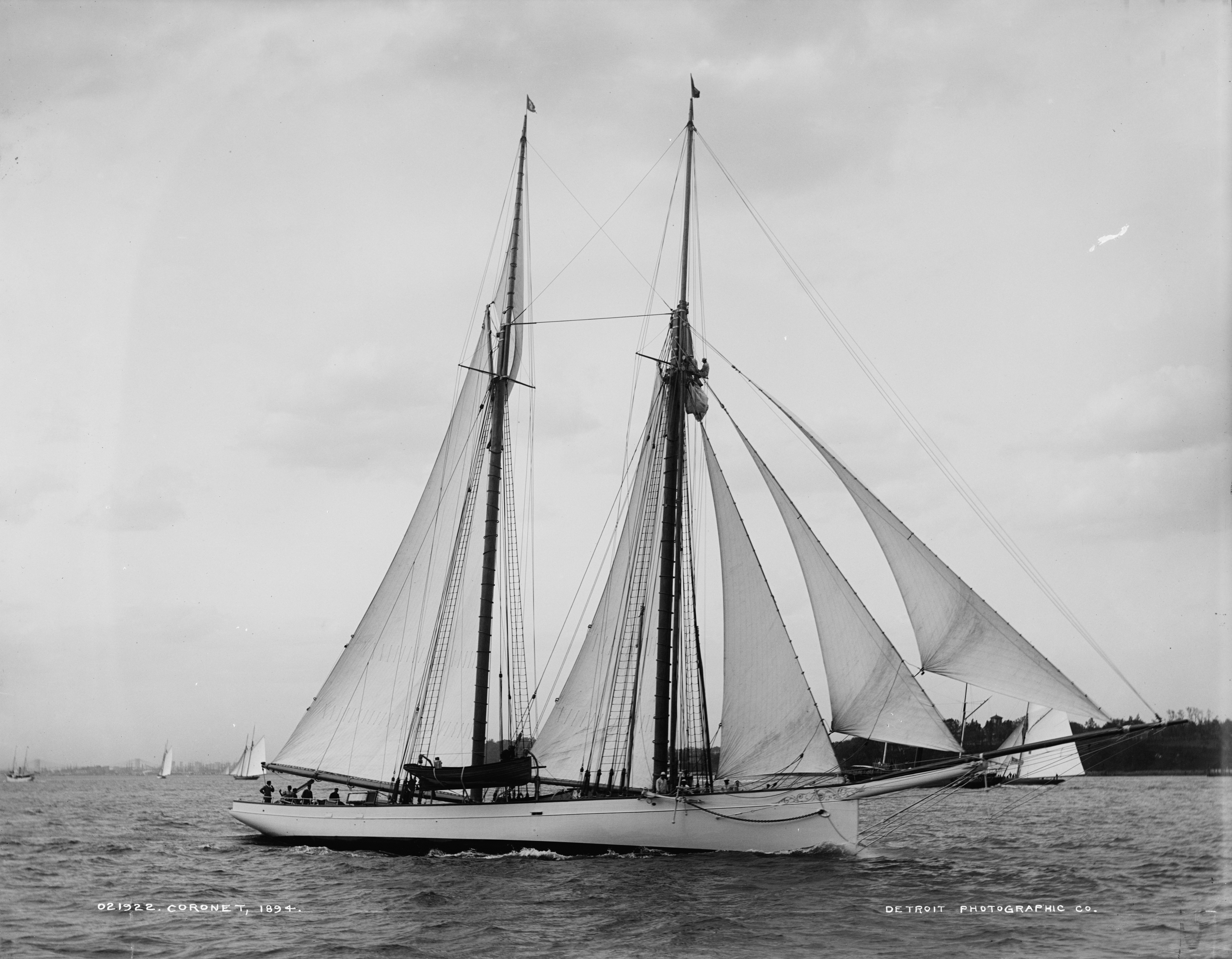
Coronet (1894)

While his manslaughter case was still in the courts, Sandford purchased the racing yacht Coronet, an extravagantly appointed schooner, for $10,000—raised in the usual Shiloh manner by prayer, "in this case, forty days and nights of it, with shifts for eating and sleeping." Sandford made two quick trips to Jerusalem in 1905-06, but when his legal difficulties had ended, he and his thirty selected crewmen and passengers (including his wife and five children) circumnavigated the globe on what he described as a missionary journey. It was an unconventional missionary enterprise. No one went ashore to preach the Gospel or even distribute religious literature. Sandford intended to "subdue the world for Christ" by intercessory prayer, claiming nations and isles for Christ by sounding brass instruments as they passed by. Oddly, Sandford added a taxidermist to a crew of reasonably experienced seamen, and he included on a ship already filled to capacity both "eyes for stuffed animals and birds" and a large harp on which he took lessons. There were moments of real peril, as when Coronet fought its way through the thundering seas around Cape Horn and then again after a powerful gale broke the main sheet and (indirectly) part of the mast almost immediately after Sandford had shot an albatross. During calmer periods, Sandford had leisure enough to hunt and receive an occasional vision.

=== Later sea voyages ===
Even before returning to Maine, Sandford heard that Florence Whittaker, a member of his outpost in Jerusalem, wanted to abandon the sect whether or not her minister husband (who had just accompanied Sandford on the multi-year circumnavigation) would leave with her. At this point, Sandford decided to bring back all his followers from Palestine, and Whittaker reluctantly agreed to accept passage to the U.S. on another Shiloh ship, the three-masted barquentine Kingdom. She was treated with utmost courtesy until they reached the Maine coast, at which point Sandford refused to let her land until she was "adjusted" to her husband. Eventually Whittaker was freed by court order and was then given custody of her children.

The story made sensational newspaper fare, especially when Whittaker sued Sandford for forcible detention. At the time Sandford was aboard Coronet, and authorities began watching ports to serve him the legal papers. He determined that they would not find him, and that a mission station should be opened immediately in Africa and perhaps another in Greenland. In December 1910, more than seventy men, women, and children headed off to Africa, divided between Kingdom and Coronet. In March 1911, Kingdom went aground and was destroyed off the coast of French West Africa. Sandford took everyone aboard Coronet, which now became fearfully overloaded with people and undersupplied with food and water.

Nevertheless, Sandford heard the supernatural direction, "Continue," which he interpreted to mean to sail on to Greenland. After recrossing the Atlantic to catch the northerly currents, Coronet passed up numerous opportunities to take on water and supplies, Sandford announcing that God had ordered him not to put into port in the U.S. or Canada. Finally, on September 6, 1911, there was a "quiet mutiny" of some sort off the Grand Banks, and Coronet was turned south. Unfortunately, the ship now made little headway, and the passengers and crew were saved from possible starvation only by the fortuitous appearance of the ocean liner S.S. Lapland, which provided some food—but ominously, no fruit or vegetables.

Almost before they knew what was happening, men began to fall victim to scurvy; and within a few days after Coronet reached Portland on October 21, 1911, scurvy had claimed the lives of six crew members. Sandford was first arrested on Whittaker's warrant and then, a few days later, for being responsible for the deaths—"unlawfully, knowingly, and willingly" allowing a ship to "proceed on a voyage at sea without sufficient provisions."

=== Trial, conviction, and imprisonment ===
Sandford refused to employ legal counsel at the trial, although he did receive legal advice—which he rejected. In court, he declared that the sickness and starvation aboard Coronet was punishment from God for refusing to obey his command to continue to Greenland. The jury brought in a guilty verdict within an hour. On December 17, 1911, Sanford was sentenced to serve not more than ten years at the federal penitentiary in Atlanta, Georgia.

Although Sandford accepted imprisonment as the will of God, he initially had difficulty bending to prison regulations. But with sleep, proper nourishment, and enforced exercise, his health gradually improved. He even insisted that Shiloh residents drop whatever they were doing at 11:30 and 4:00 and exercise with him. Sandford was made a gatekeeper and given a pass that allowed him to spend some time out of doors. He also volunteered to teach a group of prisoners how to read and write, and especially enjoyed conducting a weekly Bible class that began with one student and grew to more than a hundred. Eventually Shiloh was allowed to send Sandford a harp, and he was not only able to practice but gave at least two concerts at the prison.

Sandford had appointed seven ministers to share responsibility for leading the group, but his letters were treated like "a purse of gold." Many of them, even private letters to his family, were printed and distributed. Because prisoners were only allowed to send two letters a month, a sect member moved to Atlanta and took dictation during weekly visits.

== Later career ==
=== Religious downfall ===
During his imprisonment, Sandford tried to promote his teenaged son John as the new leader of The Kingdom, and he seems to have had some success at editing a new periodical, The Golden Trumpet. But when, in 1915, John was put in charge of an inquisitorial board called the "Eye-of-the-Needle," intended to probe the souls of Shiloh residents, Sandford himself brought the experiment to a halt when his son incurred resentment and, in any case, proved temperamentally unsuited to the task. Shortly thereafter, Marguerite, one of Sandford's daughters, ran away from the community, a serious blow to his authority because of his insistence that leaders be able to "handle their children."

Given three years off for good behavior, Sandford was released from prison in September 1918. When he reappeared at Shiloh, he was served a sumptuous meal, although many residents had recently suffered serious illness and almost all, hunger. Sandford's return sparked new contributions and new healings, even food enough for two meals a day. Nevertheless, three days after his arrival, another of Sandford's daughters ran away, and a few months later he left Maine for the sect's Boston headquarters. Furthermore, the sect had conducted virtually no evangelistic outreach since the beginning of Sandford's imprisonment in 1911.

The end of the Shiloh community came suddenly in 1920, after the death of Shiloh resident Elma Hastings and a suit brought by relatives for guardianship of her children on the grounds of non-support by their father. The Children's Protective Society of Maine, having investigated living conditions at Shiloh, urged that all minors be removed from the community.

In March 1920, Sandford sent the message, "Work." No one anticipated that this directive would effectively end the Shiloh community within days. Two months later the prayer vigils had stopped, the Bible school was closed, and Shiloh's population had dropped from 370 to a handful. As Nelson has written, once the men went off to the mills, everything changed. With "the assurance that they would never be hungry again," that their needs would be met in the same way everyone else's were met, "there was no reason to stay. They could be ordinary Christians anywhere."

=== Retirement ===
Before Shiloh was finally deserted in May, Sandford heard the heavenly direction to, "Retire." For the remainder of his life, he lived in seclusion near the village of Hobart, New York, in the Catskill Mountains. He prayed, farmed, raised sheep, studied astronomy, taught small groups, and gradually regathered his scattered followers into centers in different parts of the country. Messages were delivered to the faithful by a smaller inner circle.

Sandford continued to be supported by the tithes of his followers, and his retirement was "satisfying and serene," although his papers and books were twice destroyed in house fires. To some degree Sandford relaxed his earlier rhetoric. On New Year's Eve, 1941, he received a message from God to "remit the sins of each and every person that has been baptized since October 1, 1901." But he never renounced his claim to be Elijah; nor did he ever express remorse for those who had died on Coronet thirty years earlier.

Sandford's death on March 4, 1948, was quiet and peaceful. His funeral and interment, however, were hasty and secretive. The news of his death was not released to the press for six weeks. Sandford had, of course, not died as Elijah in Jerusalem, but as an unheralded inhabitant of a Catskill village.

== Legacy ==
The Kingdom continued after Sandford's death under the informal leadership of Victor Abram, his personal secretary, although Sandford never had a true successor. At Abram’s death in 1977, his son-in-law, Joseph Wakeman, became leader but thought of himself "as more of a caretaker." The membership then gradually learned that Abram had had a series of extramarital affairs while leading an organization that emphasized moral purity.

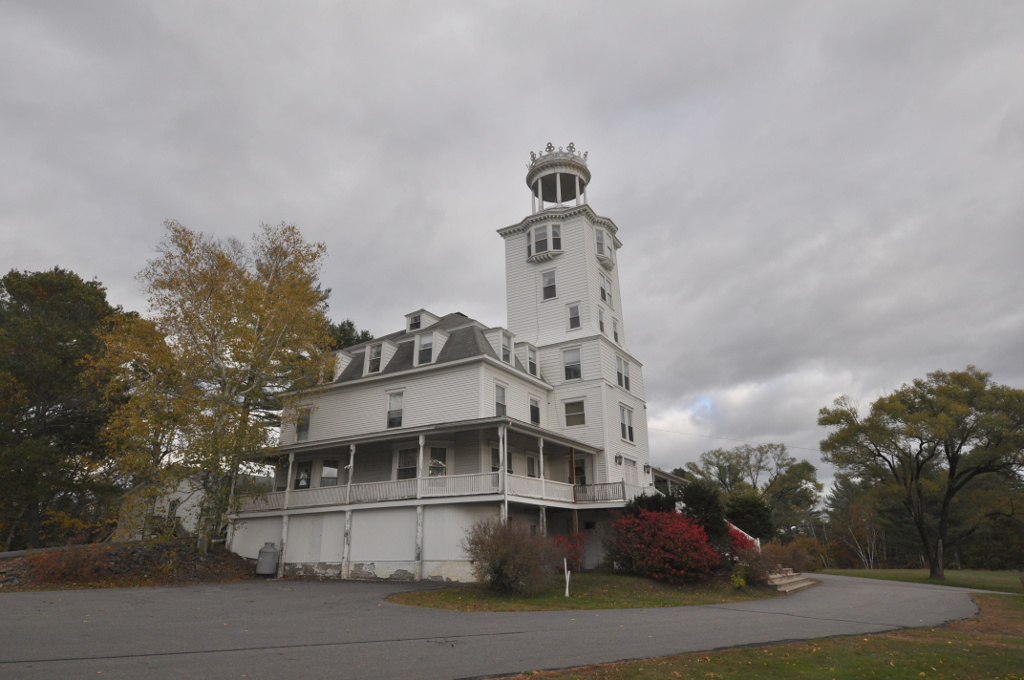
The Shiloh Chapel in 2019.

A successor organization, Kingdom Christian Ministries—reorganized in 1998 after a split occasioned by continued debate over Sandford's theology—has several hundred members at a few centers in the eastern United States. An independent evangelical Christian church, Shiloh Chapel, meets in a remaining portion of the original Shiloh building in Durham, Maine; it is no longer affiliated with Kingdom Christian Ministries. The building is listed on the National Register of Historic Places for its distinctive architecture and history.

Author Stephen King spent part of his childhood in Durham, Maine, and elements of the novel Salem's Lot, such as the Marsten House, were inspired by Sandford's cult and their Shiloh Chapel. King mentioned a fictionalized version of the Shiloh church located near Castle Rock, Maine, in his stories The Body and Revival. In the latter book he described Sandford as "an apocalypse-monger who encouraged parents to whip their children for petty sins."

== See also ==
- The Higher Life movement
- List of theologians
- List of Atlanta U.S. Penitentiary inmates
- List of Bates College alumni

== Bibliography ==
- William C. Hiss, "Shiloh: Frank Sandford and the Kingdom, 1893-1948," PhD dissertation, Tufts University, 1978.
- Shirley Nelson, Fair, Clear, and Terrible: The Story of Shiloh, Maine (Latham, New York: British American Publishing, 1989). Nelson was the daughter of former members.
- Frank S. Murray, The Sublimity of Faith (Amherst, NH: The Kingdom Press, 1981).
- Timothy F. Murray, The Coronet Story: Conquering and to Conquer (Highland Press, 1998).
- Shawn Francis Peters, When Prayer Fails: Faith Healing, Children, and the Law (New York: Oxford University Press, 2008).
