= Battle of Menotomy =

1775 battle of the American Revolutionary War

Coordinates: 42.416°N 71.153°W

- Part of the American Revolutionary War
Date	April 19, 1775 (251 years ago)
Location	Menotomy, Middlesex County, Massachusetts
Result	American victory

Belligerents
Massachusetts Bay	Great Britain

Commanders and leaders
William Heath; Gideon Foster	Hugh Percy

Strength
5,100	1,700

Casualties and losses
25 killed	40 killed

The Battle of Menotomy (April 19, 1775) is regarded as a continuation of the Battles of Lexington and Concord. The original force of 700 British regulars had been met by reinforcements in East Lexington to form a combined force of 1700 men. As for the colonial forces, a plaque placed at The Foot of the Rocks in Arlington Heights observes that “British Troops in retreat from bloody first skirmishes at Lexington and Concord were here opposed by colonial forces gathering from four counties and thirty towns. More men fell at the Foot of the Rocks and on the plains of Menotomy than in every other locale through which the adversary forces fought, that long day, April 19, 1775." 5,100 men from eastern Middlesex County and southern Essex County gathered in Menotomy to meet the retreating British troops on their way to Boston from Concord. 25 rebels and 40 British troops were killed in this battle. It was here in Menotomy that the first British soldiers were captured.

== Prelude ==
The village of Menotomy in present-day Arlington, Massachusetts is located on Massachusetts Avenue between Boston and Lexington. On April 18, the Revolutionary body, the Committee of Safety, met there at the Black Horse Tavern, in arms over British policies perceived as being oppressive. At 3 A.M. the following day, the British troops marched through town en route to Concord to destroy the military stores collected there, rousing the Committee from its sleep.

== Battle ==
While the fighting was going on in Lexington and Concord, 5,100 militia men from thirteen towns arrived in Menotomy from Middlesex and Essex Counties. These men took up positions in and around houses, stone walls, fields and barns along the road the British troops would take on their retreat to Boston. The British column stretched for an entire mile.

Orders were given by British commanding general Hugh Percy for the British troops to eliminate snipers. Homes were ransacked, plundered, and set ablaze. Finally, the American militiamen were set off.

Wrote author Thomas Fleming, "What followed was a bloody running fight, a kind of serial ambush that surprised and bedeviled the British, hardened the rebellious Americans’ resolve and spawned the legend that the Continentals fought “unfairly” like Indians, hitting and running and sniping from concealed positions."

Ultimately, the bloodiest fighting of the first day of the American Revolution took place at a single house as the British cleared a path for their retreat. Of the 25 militia men killed in Menotomy, 10 were found dead afterward in the Jason Russell House, while a total of 21 were killed in the house or on the grounds, as noted on that page. During the fighting in Menotomy as a whole, 40 British soldiers were killed.

"Battle Green [in Lexington] was an accident. Concord Bridge, a skirmish. But in the most brutal and deadly warfare of April 19, 1775, nearly 6,000 combatants fought hand to hand and house to house, the length and breadth of Menotomy. At the Foot of the Rocks, the British 'regulars' encountered their worst nightmare: a nascent Continental Army." – historian A. Michael Ruderman.

The three battles at Lexington, Concord and Menotomy are celebrated in seven states as Patriots' Day.

== See also ==
- Jason Russell House
