= George Higgins (footballer, born 1925) =

Scottish footballer (1925–1993)

Personal information
- Date of birth: 16 June 1925
- Place of birth: Dundee, Scotland
- Date of death: 13 April 1993 (aged 67)
- Place of death: Grimsby, England
- Position: Full-back

Senior career*
Years	Team	Apps	(Gls)
1945–1946	Lochee Harp		
1946–1951	Blackburn Rovers	53	(0)
1951–1954	Bolton Wanderers	69	(0)
1954–1957	Grimsby Town	47	(0)
1957–19??	Scarborough		

Managerial career
- 1964: Grimsby Town (caretaker)
- 1969: Grimsby Town (caretaker)
- * Club domestic league appearances and goals

George Higgins (16 June 1925 – 13 April 1993) was a Scottish professional footballer who played as a full-back.
