= George Higgins (footballer, born 1880) =

Scottish footballer

Personal information
- Full name: George Higgins
- Date of birth: 23 January 1880
- Place of birth: Beith, Scotland
- Positions: Centre half; right back

Senior career*
Years	Team	Apps	(Gls)
1905–1908	Queen's Park	19	(0)
- * Club domestic league appearances and goals

George Higgins was a Scottish amateur footballer who played in the Scottish League for Queen's Park as a centre half.

== Personal life ==
Higgins rose to the rank of lieutenant in the Royal Scots Fusiliers during the First World War. While holding the rank of second lieutenant, he was shot in the hand in 1915.

== Career statistics ==
Appearances and goals by club, season and competition
Club	Season	League			National Cup		Other		Total	
Club	Season	Division	Apps	Goals	Apps	Goals	Apps	Goals	Apps	Goals
Queen's Park	1905–06	Scottish First Division	19	0	1	0	3 (Note: 2 appearances in Glasgow Merchants Charity Cup, 1 appearance in Glasgow Cup)	0	23	0
Career total			19	0	1	0	3	0	23	4
