= Durham, Maine =

Town in Maine, United States

- Town
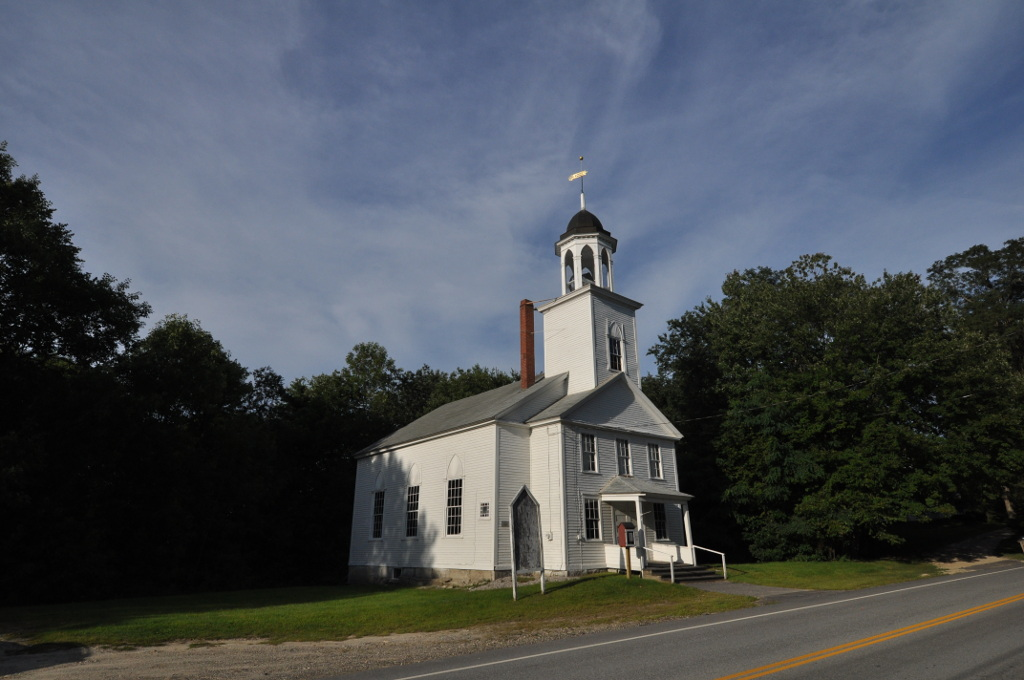
- Union Church, also used as town hall

- Seal

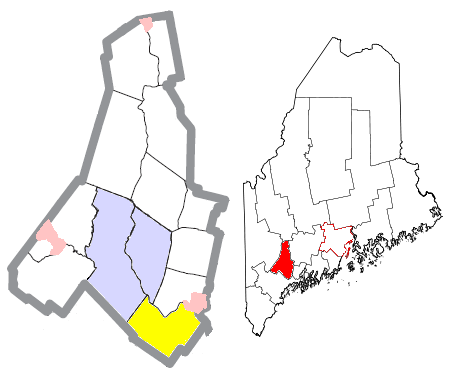
- Location of Durham (in yellow) in Androscoggin County and the state of Maine
- Coordinates: 43°59′41″N 70°07′47″W
- Country: United States
- State: Maine
- County: Androscoggin
- Incorporation: February 17, 1789
- Villages: Crossman Corner; Plummer Mill; Shiloh; South Durham; South West Bend; West Durham

Area
  - Total: 39.04 sq mi (101.11 km^{2})
  - Land: 38.28 sq mi (99.14 km^{2})
  - Water: 0.76 sq mi (1.97 km^{2})
- Elevation: 171 ft (52 m)

Population (2020)
  - Total: 4,173
  - Density: 109/sq mi (42.1/km^{2})
- Time zone: UTC-5 (Eastern (EST))
  - Summer (DST): UTC-4 (EDT)
- ZIP code: 04222
- Area code: 207
- FIPS code: 23-19105
- GNIS feature ID: 582448
- Website: durhammaine.gov

Durham is a town in Androscoggin County, Maine, United States. The population was 4,173 at the 2020 census. It is included in both the Lewiston-Auburn, Maine Metropolitan Statistical Area and the Lewiston-Auburn, Maine Metropolitan New England City and Town Area.

== History ==
Durham was named after County Durham, England, the ancestral home of the town's first settler. It was previously known as Royallsborough, named after Isaac Royall Jr.

== Geography ==
According to the United States Census Bureau, the town has a total area of 39.04 square miles (101.11 km^{2}), of which 38.28 square miles (99.14 km^{2}) is land and 0.76 square miles (1.97 km^{2}) is water.

Durham is bordered by Auburn, Lewiston, Lisbon, Topsham, Brunswick, Freeport, Pownal and New Gloucester.

Durham is considered a "gateway" town because it connects two major Maine communities, the Greater Portland Area with the Lewiston–Auburn Area.

=== Climate ===
According to the Köppen Climate Classification system, Durham has a warm-summer humid continental climate, abbreviated "Dfb" on climate maps. The hottest temperature recorded in Durham was 99 °F (37.2 °C) on June 25, 2025, while the coldest temperature recorded was −27 °F (−32.8 °C) on January 16, 2009.

Climate data for Durham, Maine, 1991–2020 normals, extremes 1994–present
Month	Jan	Feb	Mar	Apr	May	Jun	Jul	Aug	Sep	Oct	Nov	Dec	Year
Record high °F (°C)	62 (17)	64 (18)	86 (30)	91 (33)	95 (35)	99 (37)	97 (36)	97 (36)	97 (36)	87 (31)	77 (25)	68 (20)	99 (37)
Mean maximum °F (°C)	50.9 (10.5)	51.2 (10.7)	60.7 (15.9)	74.9 (23.8)	87.4 (30.8)	88.2 (31.2)	89.8 (32.1)	87.1 (30.6)	84.1 (28.9)	73.4 (23.0)	63.8 (17.7)	54.1 (12.3)	91.9 (33.3)
Mean daily maximum °F (°C)	29.3 (−1.5)	32.9 (0.5)	41.4 (5.2)	54.1 (12.3)	65.4 (18.6)	73.6 (23.1)	79.0 (26.1)	77.5 (25.3)	70.4 (21.3)	58.1 (14.5)	45.9 (7.7)	35.2 (1.8)	55.2 (12.9)
Daily mean °F (°C)	18.4 (−7.6)	20.9 (−6.2)	30.2 (−1.0)	41.8 (5.4)	52.6 (11.4)	61.9 (16.6)	67.6 (19.8)	65.9 (18.8)	58.5 (14.7)	46.9 (8.3)	36.2 (2.3)	25.6 (−3.6)	43.9 (6.6)
Mean daily minimum °F (°C)	7.5 (−13.6)	8.9 (−12.8)	19.0 (−7.2)	29.6 (−1.3)	39.7 (4.3)	50.3 (10.2)	56.2 (13.4)	54.3 (12.4)	46.5 (8.1)	35.7 (2.1)	26.5 (−3.1)	16.0 (−8.9)	32.5 (0.3)
Mean minimum °F (°C)	−11.1 (−23.9)	−8.5 (−22.5)	−1.1 (−18.4)	21.3 (−5.9)	29.4 (−1.4)	41.1 (5.1)	48.9 (9.4)	45.5 (7.5)	33.8 (1.0)	25.6 (−3.6)	13.6 (−10.2)	−0.5 (−18.1)	−15.4 (−26.3)
Record low °F (°C)	−27 (−33)	−23 (−31)	−15 (−26)	12 (−11)	24 (−4)	31 (−1)	44 (7)	37 (3)	27 (−3)	18 (−8)	3 (−16)	−23 (−31)	−27 (−33)
Average precipitation inches (mm)	3.61 (92)	3.35 (85)	4.06 (103)	4.53 (115)	3.59 (91)	4.64 (118)	3.75 (95)	3.65 (93)	4.15 (105)	5.37 (136)	4.49 (114)	4.54 (115)	49.73 (1,262)
Average snowfall inches (cm)	20.8 (53)	19.4 (49)	13.8 (35)	3.7 (9.4)	0.0 (0.0)	0.0 (0.0)	0.0 (0.0)	0.0 (0.0)	0.0 (0.0)	0.3 (0.76)	3.3 (8.4)	16.2 (41)	77.5 (196.56)
Average extreme snow depth inches (cm)	17.2 (44)	20.0 (51)	17.7 (45)	7.5 (19)	0.0 (0.0)	0.0 (0.0)	0.0 (0.0)	0.0 (0.0)	0.0 (0.0)	0.3 (0.76)	2.3 (5.8)	11.7 (30)	23.3 (59)
Average precipitation days (≥ 0.01 in)	11.4	10.1	10.7	11.7	13.2	13.7	12.0	10.9	9.7	12.2	11.4	12.6	139.6
Average snowy days (≥ 0.1 in)	8.7	7.6	5.3	1.5	0.0	0.0	0.0	0.0	0.0	0.2	1.9	6.7	31.9
Source 1: NOAA
Source 2: National Weather Service (mean maxima/minima, snow depth 2006–2020)

== Demographics ==
Historical population
Census	Pop.	Note	%±
1790	724		—
1800	1,242		71.5%
1810	1,772		42.7%
1820	1,562		−11.9%
1830	1,731		10.8%
1840	1,836		6.1%
1850	1,886		2.7%
1860	1,623		−13.9%
1870	1,350		−16.8%
1880	1,253		−7.2%
1890	1,111		−11.3%
1900	1,230		10.7%
1910	1,625		32.1%
1920	1,144		−29.6%
1930	806		−29.5%
1940	784		−2.7%
1950	1,050		33.9%
1960	1,086		3.4%
1970	1,264		16.4%
1980	2,074		64.1%
1990	2,842		37.0%
2000	3,381		19.0%
2010	3,848		13.8%
2020	4,173		8.4%
U.S. Decennial Census

=== 2010 census ===
As of the census of 2010, there were 3,848 people, 1,496 households, and 1,143 families living in the town. The population density was 100.5 inhabitants per square mile (38.8/km^{2}). There were 1,548 housing units at an average density of 40.4 per square mile (15.6/km^{2}). The racial makeup of the town was 97.8% White, 0.3% African American, 0.1% Native American, 0.5% Asian, 0.2% from other races, and 1.0% from two or more races. Hispanic or Latino of any race were 0.8% of the population.

There were 1,496 households, of which 33.5% had children under the age of 18 living with them, 63.6% were married couples living together, 7.5% had a female householder with no husband present, 5.3% had a male householder with no wife present, and 23.6% were non-families. 16.6% of all households were made up of individuals, and 4% had someone living alone who was 65 years of age or older. The average household size was 2.57 and the average family size was 2.85.

The median age in the town was 41.2 years. 22.3% of residents were under the age of 18; 5.5% were between the ages of 18 and 24; 29.1% were from 25 to 44; 33.8% were from 45 to 64; and 9.3% were 65 years of age or older. The gender makeup of the town was 50.6% male and 49.4% female.

=== 2000 census ===
As of the census of 2000, there were 3,381 people, 1,226 households, and 980 families living in the town. The population density was 88.7 inhabitants per square mile (34.2/km^{2}). There were 1,257 housing units at an average density of 33.0 per square mile (12.7/km^{2}). The racial makeup of the town was 98.96% White, 0.12% African American, 0.15% Native American, 0.27% Asian, 0.09% from other races, and 0.41% from two or more races. Hispanic or Latino of any race were 0.65% of the population.

There were 1,226 households, out of which 38.9% had children under the age of 18 living with them, 70.6% were married couples living together, 5.9% had a female householder with no husband present, and 20.0% were non-families. 12.4% of all households were made up of individuals, and 3.0% had someone living alone who was 65 years of age or older. The average household size was 2.75 and the average family size was 3.02.

In the town, the population was spread out, with 26.9% under the age of 18, 5.2% from 18 to 24, 35.5% from 25 to 44, 25.5% from 45 to 64, and 6.8% who were 65 years of age or older. The median age was 37 years. For every 100 females, there were 99.5 males. For every 100 females age 18 and over, there were 99.2 males.

The median income for a household in the town was $53,846, and the median income for a family was $55,028. Males had a median income of $35,174 versus $28,342 for females. The per capita income for the town was $20,883. About 5.9% of families and 6.6% of the population were below the poverty line, including 8.2% of those under age 18 and 9.8% of those age 65 or over.

Voter registration

Voter Registration and Party Enrollment as of January 2015
Party	Total Voters	Percentage
Unenrolled	1,282	40.3%
Republican	946	29.7%
Democratic	772	24.2%
Green Independent	179	5.6%
Total	3,179	100%

== Government ==
Durham is in Maine's 2nd congressional district, Maine Senate District 22, and Maine House of Representatives District 46.

== Education ==
- Durham Community School is a public school operated by the Durham School Department. The school provides for the education of students in grades Pre-K through 8.
- Education of a majority of the students in grades 9 through 12 is provided by Freeport High School.
- Durham is a part of Regional School Unit #5, Becky Foley is the Superintendent.

== Airport ==
The privately owned Margerison Airport is located between Hallowell Road and Royalsborough Road, just north of Rabbit Road. Its FAA identifier is ME75, and it was activated in 1979. It has two unpaved runways—headings 9/27 and 15/33. Its area control center is Boston Center, while its flight service station is Bangor.

== Notable people ==
- Edward H. Hill, founder of Central Maine Medical Center
- Stephen King, spent part of his childhood in Durham. He based the fictional town of Jerusalem's Lot on it
- Frank Sandford, founder and leader of an apocalyptic Christian sect known as "The Kingdom"
