= Bates College traditions =

Aspect of Bates College culture

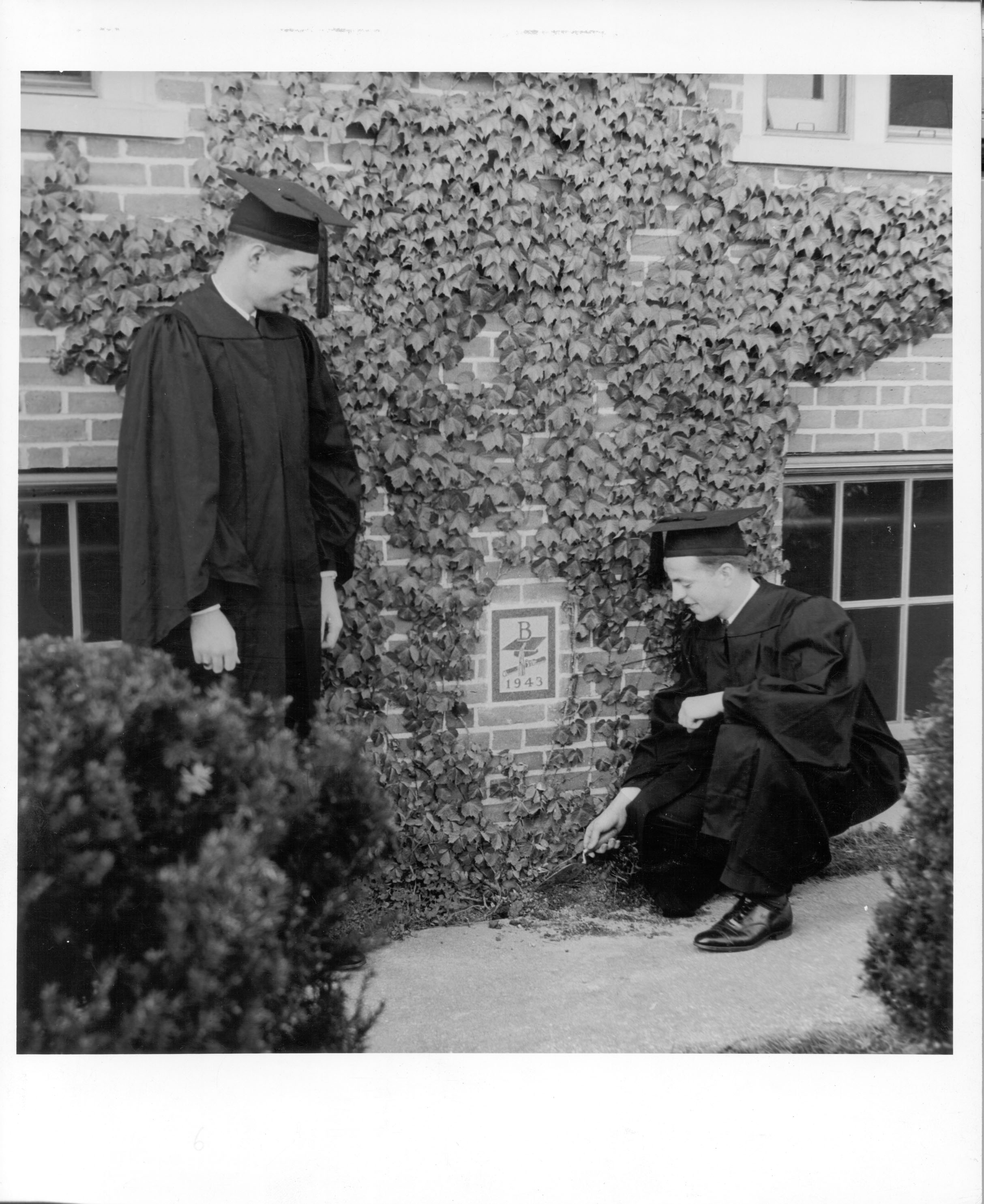
A celebration of Ivy Day on Hathorn Hall, 1943

The traditions of Bates College include the activities, songs, and academic regalia of Bates College, a private liberal arts college in Lewiston, Maine. They are well known on campus and nationally as an embedded component of the student life at the college and its history. While some traditions have wide-ranging campus support, others are officially discouraged by the administration. Many traditions are paralleled at peer schools in the New England Small College Athletic Conference (NESCAC), and in the Ivy League. Bates along with Bowdoin and Colby College share multiple traditions and rivalries that comprise the Colby-Bates-Bowdoin Consortium (CBB).

The college's most famous tradition is Newman Day, which received national attention when actor Paul Newman – the namesake of the tradition – publicly denounced it, asking the then-President Thomas Hedley Reynolds to institutionally bar the activity. The tradition continues to this day; it is not sponsored by the college.

== Wintertime traditions ==
=== Winter Carnival ===
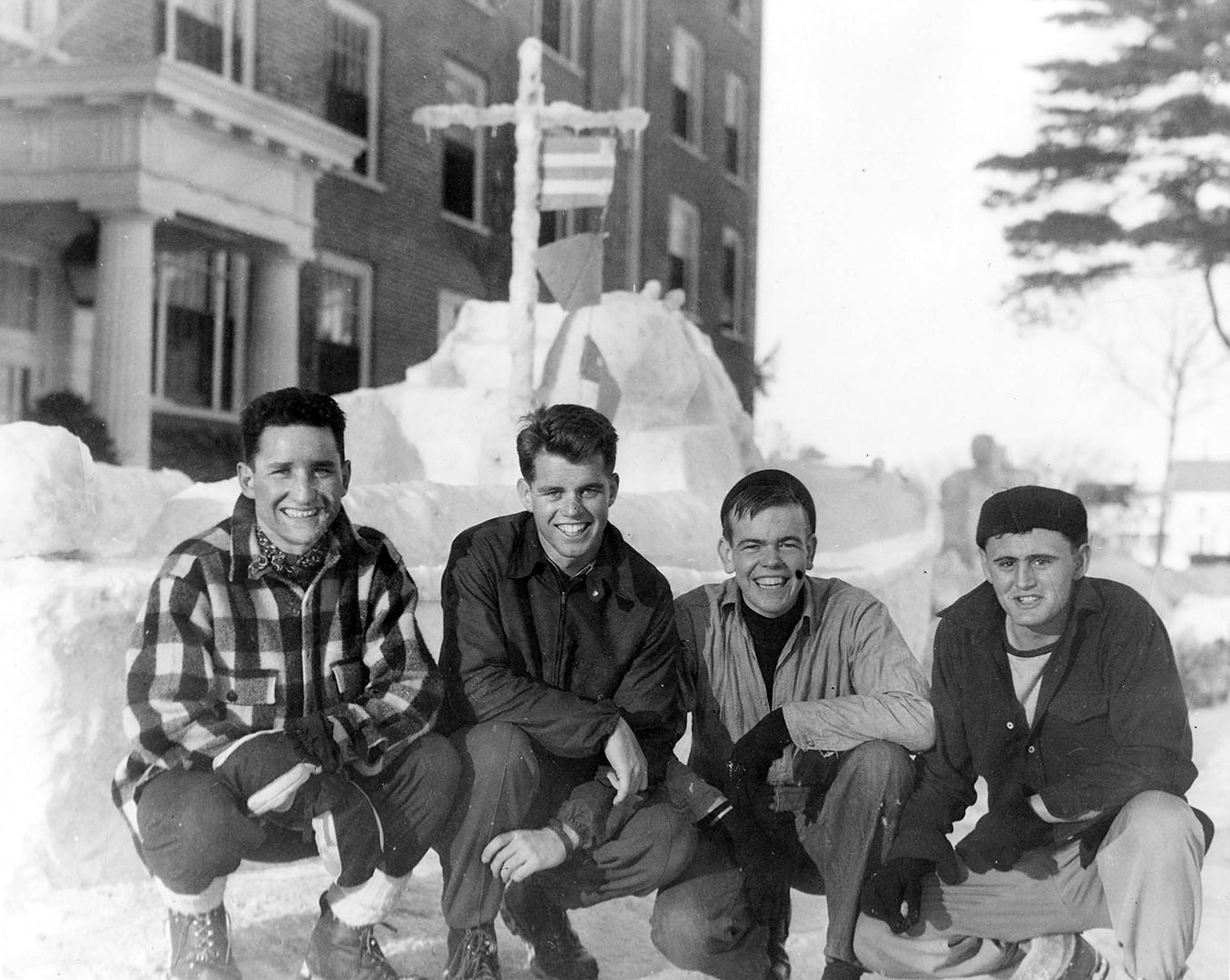
Robert F. Kennedy, in front of Smith Hall during Winter Carnival in the early 1940s.

The Bates Outing Club, on odd to even years since 1920, has held a Winter Carnival which comprises a themed four-day event that includes performances, dances, and games. Past Winter Carnivals have included "a Swiss Olympic skier swooshing down Mount David", faculty and student football games, faculty and administration skits, over-sized snow sculptures, "serenading of the dormitories", and an expeditions to Camden. When alumnus Edmund Muskie, Class of 1936, was a Governor of Maine, he participated in a torch relay from Augusta to Lewiston in celebration of the 1960 Winter Olympics. Robert F. Kennedy, with his naval classmates, built a replica of their boat back in Massachusetts out of snow in front of Smith Hall, during their carnival. This tradition is second only to Dartmouth College (1910) as the oldest of its kind in the United States, and serves as a major contribution to the connection between the two colleges. Mustachio Bashio, an annual party celebrating beards and mustaches held during winter carnival. The tradition was profiled by The New York Times in 2010.

=== Newman Day ===
Alma mater of Bates College

Here's to Bates, our Alma Mater dear,
Proudest and fairest of her peers;
We pledge to her our loyalty,
Our faith and our honor thru the years.
Long may her praises resound.
Long may her sons exalt her name.
May her glory shine while time endures,
Here's to our Alma Mater's fame.

— by Irving H. Blake (Class of 1911)
Music by Hubert P. Davis (Class of 1912)

Research has shown references made to Newman Day in The Bates Student as early as the late 1970s, however, the day was marked originally with students throwing food at each other in the dining hall. The tradition was debuted in the January 1976 Winter Carnival with one of the student exclaiming that Paul Newman once said "24 hours in a day, 24 beers in a case. Coincidence? I think not," as a rhetorical mandate. Originally named Paul Newman Day, it was subsequently renamed Newman Day, and includes activities where one consumes one beer every hour during the hours 12:00 am to 11:59 pm on April 24.

Newman opposed the tradition, which received media attention in 2004 after Newman's lawyer sent a letter to Princeton University and Bates registering Newman's disapproval, and requesting that the event be disassociated from his name, due to the fact that he did not endorse the behaviors. Bates disavowed any responsibility for the event, responding that Newman Day is not sponsored, endorsed, or encouraged by the university itself and is solely an unofficial event among students. Celebration of Newman Day has continued, however, and participants indulge during the stipulated 24-hour period, during which participants are forbidden to sleep or vomit; sleeping or vomiting constitutes a "reset" that negates previous consumption, requiring the participant to restart from zero.

=== Puddle Jump ===
Originally taking place on a day near Saint Patrick's Day, March 17, but since incorporated as part of Winter Carnival in late January, the Bates College Outing Club cuts a hole by a chainsaw or by the original axe used in the inaugural Puddle Jump of 1975, in the ice on Lake Andrews. Students from all class years jump into the hole, often in costumes, to celebrate, "exuberance at the end of a hard winter." By mid-evening, they eat donuts, drink cider and receive a cappella performances.

== Summertime traditions ==
=== Ivy day ===
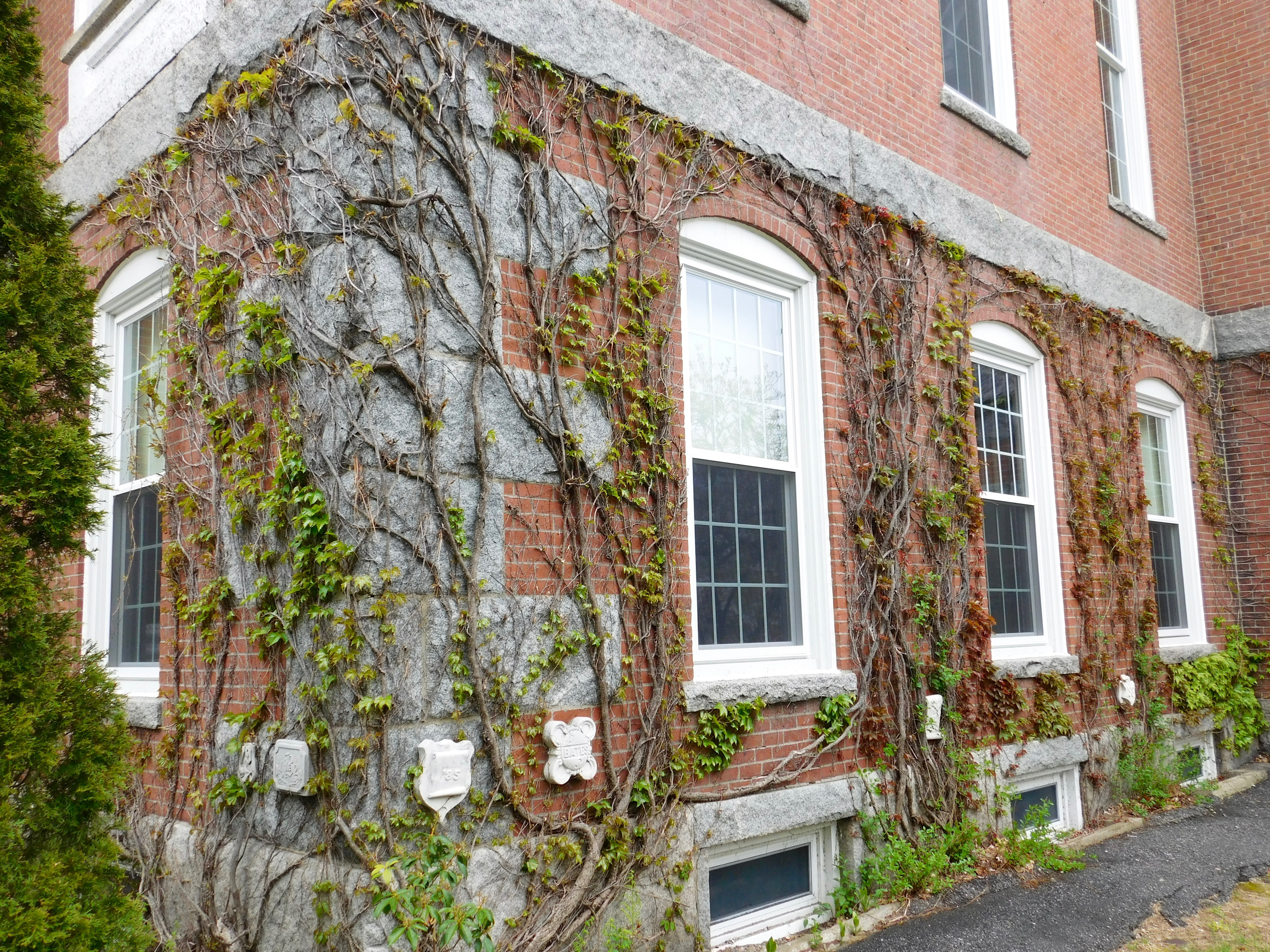
Ivy growing on the side of Hathorn Hall, featuring respective classes' Ivy Stones

The class graduates participate in an Ivy Day which installs a granite Ivy Stone onto one of the academic or residential buildings on campus. They serve as a symbol of the class and their respective history both academically and socially. Some classes donate to the college, in the form gates, facades, and door outlines, by inscribing or creating their own version of symbolic icons of the college's seal or other prominent insignia. This usually occurs on graduation day, but may occur on later dates with alumni returning to the campus. This tradition is shared with the University of Pennsylvania and Princeton University. On Ivy Day, members of Phi Beta Kappa are announced.

=== Sumner's chair ===
Bates' founder was a friend of U.S. Senator Charles Sumner who was among the most radical of the abolitionists in the U.S. Congress. Sumner also believed in integrated schools and equal rights for all races. Cheney asked Sumner to create a collegiate motto for Bates and he suggested the Latin phrase amore ac studio which he translated as "with love for learning" or "with ardor and devotion."

On the afternoon of May 22, 1856, Preston Brooks confronted Sumner in the Senate chamber and assaulted him with a cane after reading Sumner's speech regarding the Kansas–Nebraska Act. After the incident the chair was gifted to Bates. It is used for inaugurations, graduations and other formal occasions.

== Traditions with Bowdoin ==
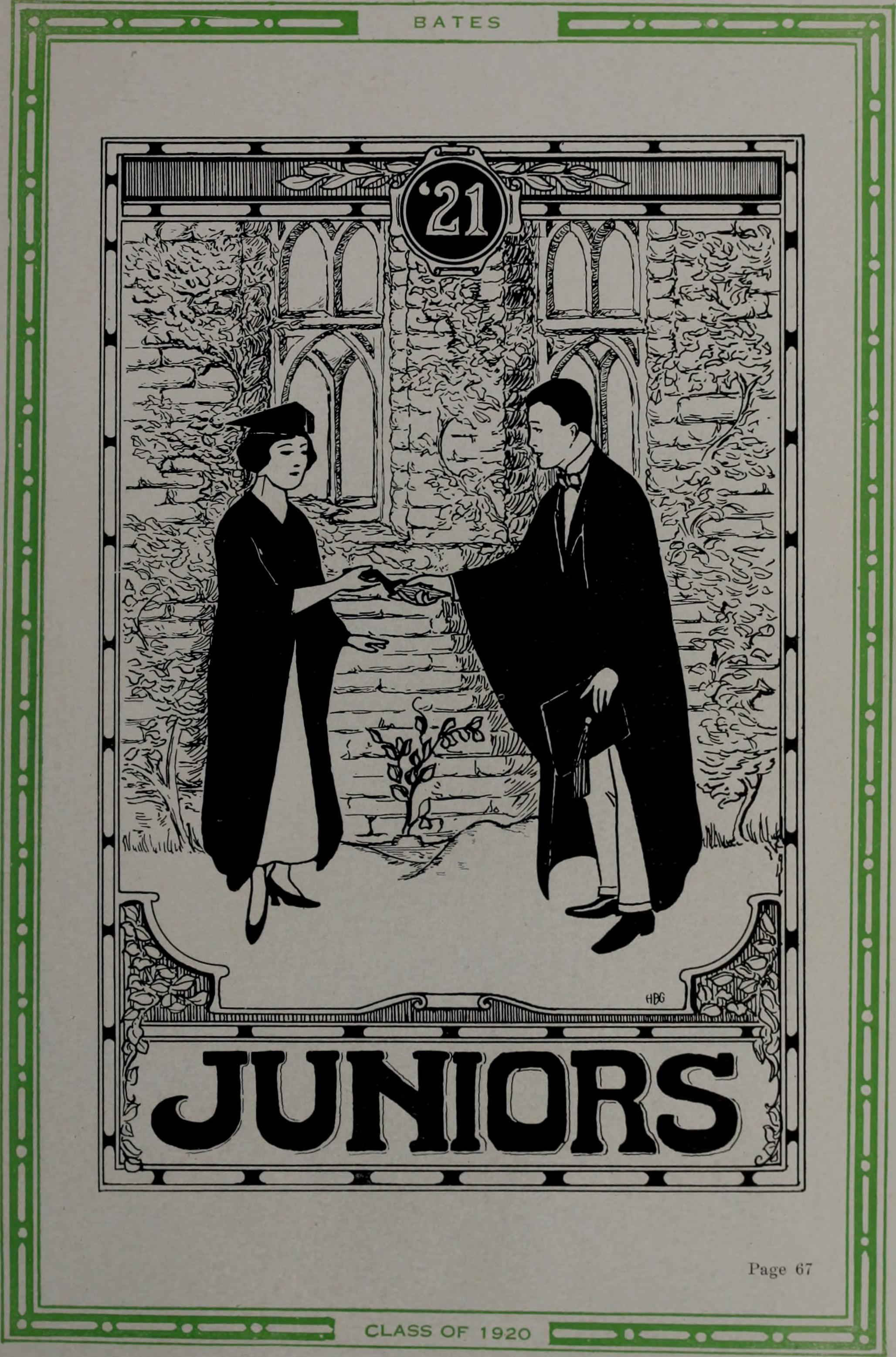
Bates participates in Ivy Day while Bowdoin participates in springtime "Ivies" weekend inductions.

From its inception, Bates served as an alternative to a more traditional and historically conservative Bowdoin College. There is a long tradition of rivalry and competitiveness between the two colleges, revolving around socioeconomic class, academic quality, and collegiate athletics. Many alumni of Bowdoin subsequently went on to develop Bates during the 1860s and alumni of Bates lectured at Bowdoin. Bates and Bowdoin have competed against each other athletically since the 1870s, and subsequently share one of the ten oldest NCAA Division III football rivalries, in the United States.

The Bates–Bowdoin Game is the most attended football game every academic year at both colleges. Bowdoin developed a "football fight song" entitled, "Forward the White" in 1913. All football games between the two occurred on Bates' Garcelon Field (1899) and Bowdoin's Whittier Field (1902).

== Annual traditions ==
Bates has many other official and unofficial annual traditions including WRBC's Annual Trivia Night (since 1979), Ronjstock (since 2000), Senior Pub Crawl Parade to the Goose, Lick-It, Eighties Dance, Halloween Dance, Class Dinner, Harvest Dinner, Triad Dance (since 1981), Stanton Ride (1800s to 1960s, with a revival by VP Hiss in 2000s), Clambake at Popham Beach and Winter Carnival by the Outing Club (since 1920), Alumni Reunion Parade (since 1914), and the annual Oxford–Bates debate (since 1921).

== See also ==
- History of Bates College
- List of colleges and universities in Maine
- Liberal arts colleges in the United States
