= Chop Point School =

School located in Woolwich, Maine, United States

Coordinates: 43°58′56.7″N 69°49′41.5″W

Location
- 425 Chop Point Road; Woolwich, Maine 04579; United States

Information
- Type: Private Christian school
- Religious affiliation(s): Christian
- Established: 1987; 38 years ago
- Principal: Josh Bailey
- Grades: K-12
- Campus size: 50 acres
- Campus type: Rural
- Color(s): Blue and white
- Mascot: Blue Bear
- Nickname: Blue Bears
- Website: choppointschool.org

Chop Point School is a private Christian school located in the town of Woolwich, Maine.

== History ==
The school site was originally inhabited by Native Americans sometime in the early 1500s to 1600s. At some point there was likely at least a small farm here and even a small fort possibly. Many archeological artifacts have been found on campus ranging from colonial pipes to Indian arrow heads and fishing weights. During the revolutionary war it is possible that Benedict Arnold may have stopped here or at least passed by on his way to Canada up the Kennebec River. In the late 1800s to early 1900s an all girls camp was established at Chop Point, the camp was called the Merrymeeting Camp at this time. Then in the 1950s the camp changed hands again as it was purchased by Franklin Hayward and Peter Willard. With this new land they planned to start a Christian summer camp. However, they were forced to postpone any and all building due to the nearby Kennebec River being heavily polluted by upriver waste.

This put the plans for a camp on hold until the river was no longer a hazard and once they were later able to receive accreditation from the American Camping Association in 1967. With that, Franklin Hayward and Peter Willard were able to start the Christian summer camp Chop Point. Three decades later, in 1987, Hayward and Willard added Chop Point School, a Christian school, to along with their camp.

== Geography ==
The school is located on Chops Point, a peninsula that juts into the Kennebec River. The campus looks out into Merrymeeting Bay and The Chops. The campus has hills, multiple buildings, camp cabins and a barn. Other facilities include tennis courts, a playground, a large gymnasium, a system of trails along the bay and a soccer field called Bridge Field.

== Students ==
The school's total enrollment is 88 students of ages ranging from kindergarten to the 12th grade. There are exchange students that come every year from all over the world; they typically live at the school during the year. The teacher-student ratio is one to six.

== Athletics ==
Chop Point School offers a variety of sports. The soccer team is class D in the Maine Principals Association. The 2015 soccer team went 2–8, with wins against High-View Christian Academy and Temple Academy. The school also hosts a running club and the basketball team competes in the MCSSL.
