= Hilton Orrington/Evanston =

Hotel in Evanston, Illinois

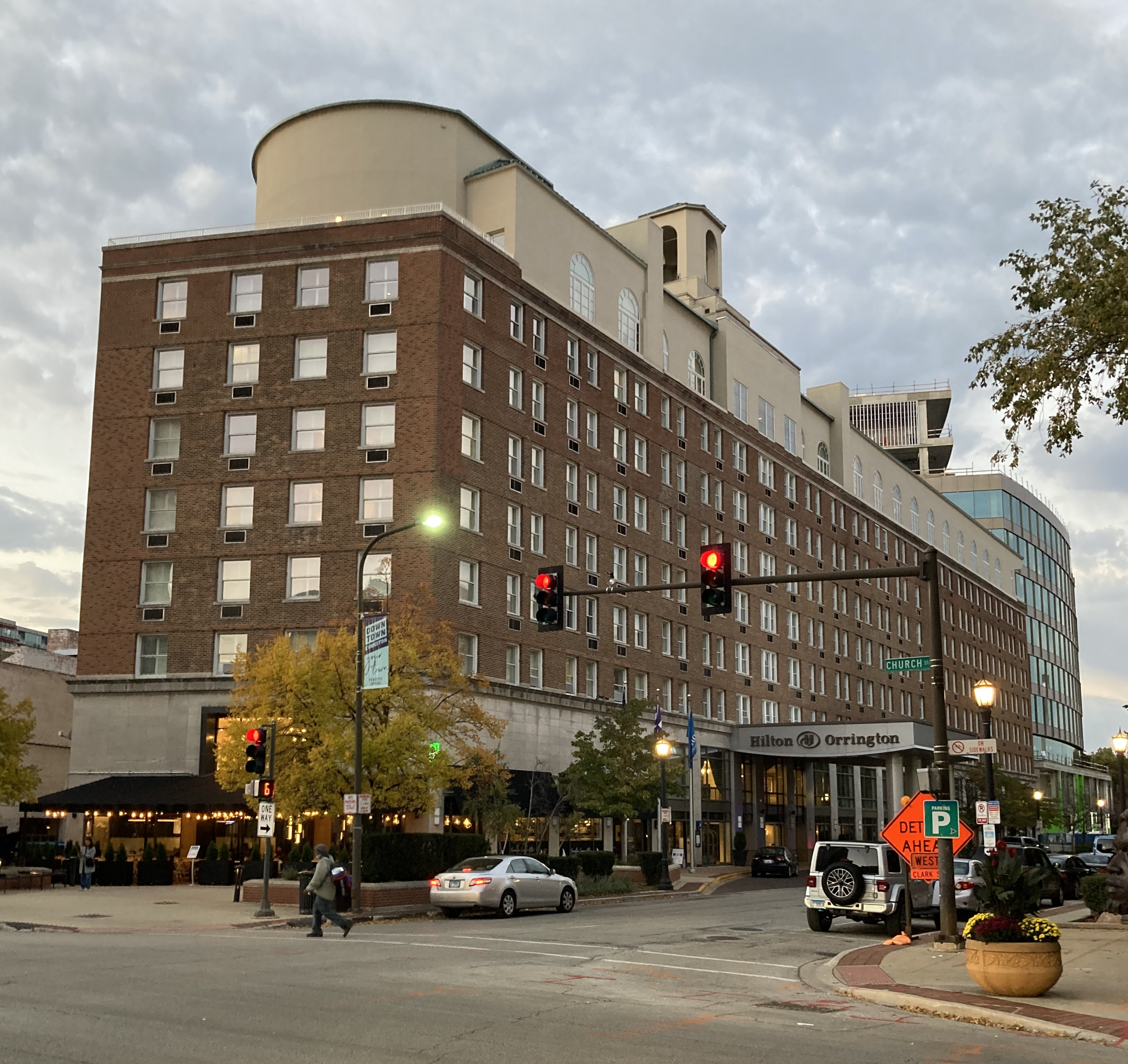

- Location within Illinois

General information
- Location: 1710 Orrington Avenue, Evanston, Illinois
- Coordinates: 42.048902°N 87.680800°W
- Completed: 1923

Website
- Official website

The Hilton Orrington/Evanston is a hotel in Evanston, Illinois which was built in 1923.

It was listed by the National Trust for Historic Preservation as a member of the Historic Hotels of America.

It is named for Orrington Lunt, a co-founder of nearby Northwestern University.

== COVID-19 and closing ==
The hotel's business was hit hard by the COVID-19 pandemic in Illinois. It served as temporary housing for both Northwestern University students and the local homeless population.

The hotel planned a temporary closure over the Thanksgiving holiday in 2020, but never reopened. In February 2021, the hotel was the subject of a foreclosure lawsuit. Olshan Properties, who bought the Hilton property in 2015, had not paid the mortgage on the property since August 2020 and Deutsche Bank, its creditor, filed a foreclosure lawsuit of $50 million against the company.
