= Newman Day =

Collegiate drinking tradition

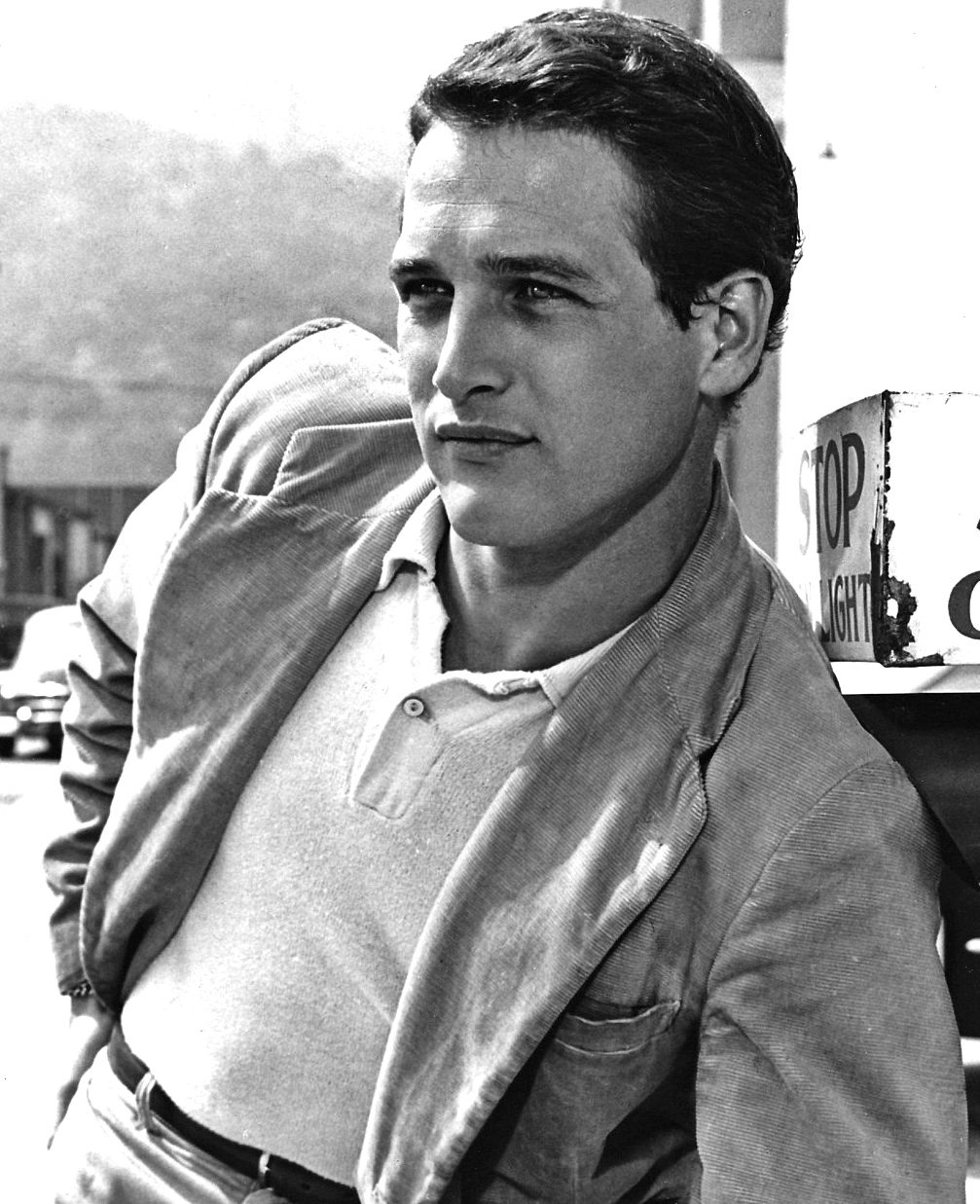
The tradition is named after American actor Paul Newman after he said: "24 hours in a day, 24 beers in a case. Coincidence? I think not."

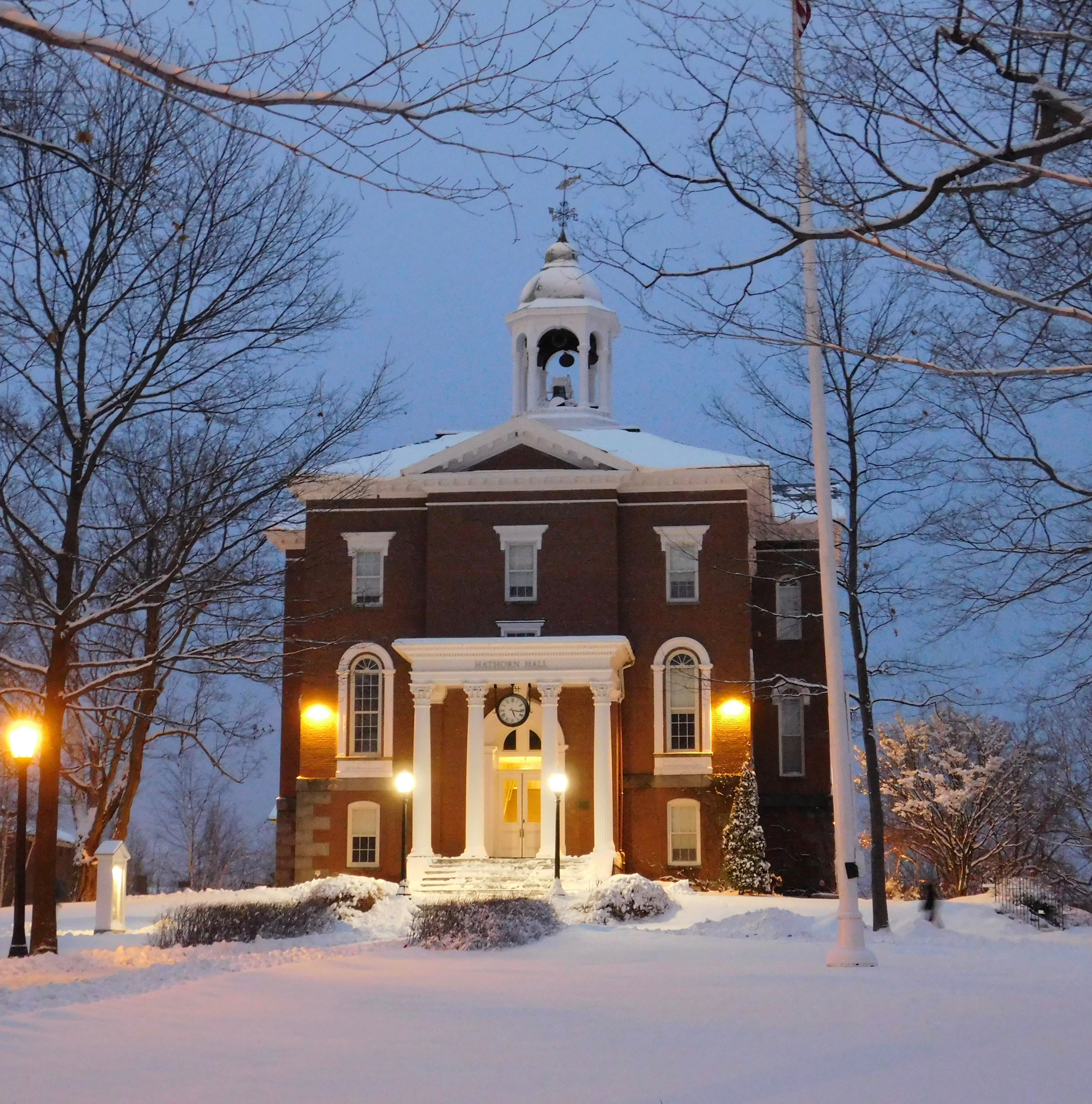
Originally started at Bates College, the tradition has spread to other educational institutions, including his alma mater.

Newman Day is a collegiate drinking tradition in which 24 beers are consumed over 24 hours. The ritual was initiated by students of Bates College, in Lewiston, Maine. At its inception during the college's annual January 1976 Winter Carnival, a student exclaimed that Paul Newman once said "24 hours in a day, 24 beers in a case. Coincidence? I think not," as a rhetorical mandate.

Originally named Paul Newman Day, it was renamed Newman Day (sometimes known as Newman's Day), and became an unofficial student tradition at Bates in the years to follow. As time went on the tradition was picked up by his alma mater, Kenyon College, as well as Princeton. At Bates, Newman Day occurs on the Friday of Winter Carnival, although other schools have opted to celebrate on April 24. In all cases, the event begins at 12:00 am and concludes at 11:59 pm. During his life Newman publicly opposed the tradition and asserted that the quote inspiring it was misattributed.

The tradition has been spun off into new traditions and similar activities by West Virginia University and the University of Virginia. At the College of Saint Benedict and Saint John's University in Minnesota, the same tradition is celebrated annually under the name of "Case Day".

== History ==
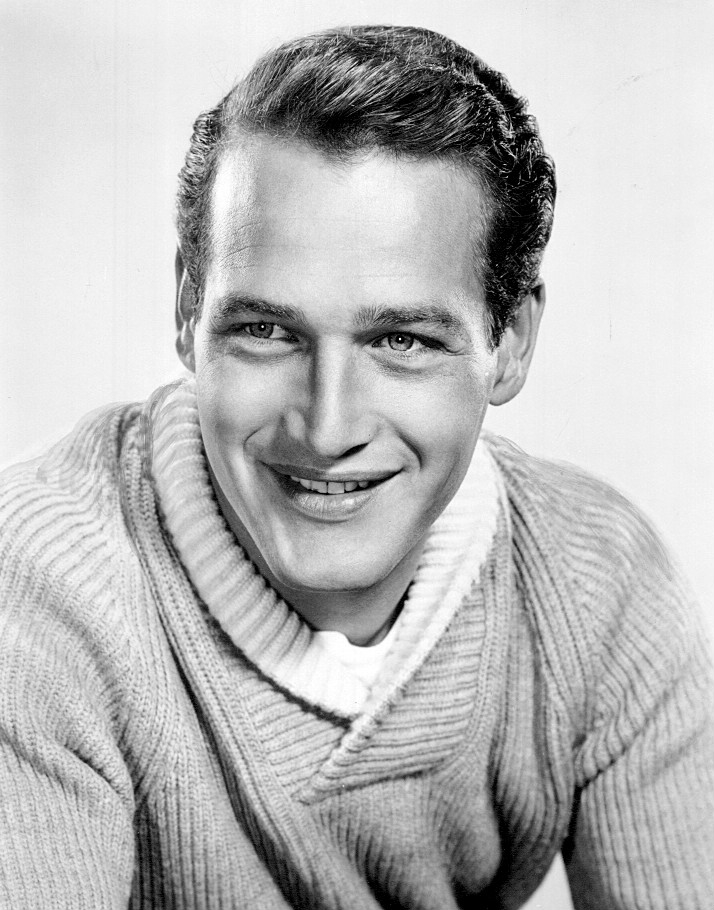
Newman called the tradition "cruel" and "abhorrent."

References were made to Newman Day in The Bates Student in the late 1970s, describing a day during which students participated in food fights in the dining hall. However, the activity was renamed "Newman Day" following a fictitious mandate attributed to Newman. In a speech to college students that was profiled by a magazine, Newman stated:

24 hours in a day, 24 beers in a case. Coincidence? I think not.

The tradition was officially debuted on the campus of Bates College in Lewiston, Maine, during the January 1976 Winter Carnival by students participating in the day's events. Newman Day begins at 12:00 am and concludes at 11:59 pm. The traditional and original rules stipulate that one beer must be consumed every hour, within the hour, during this time period. During this time, the participant is not allowed to sleep and is not allowed to "boot" (throw up), or else the amount of beer consumed is "reset" to zero and they must begin the challenge again (i.e., if someone were to throw up at 11:50 pm, should they choose to complete the activity, they would have to consume 24 beers in nine minutes or 540 seconds). The participant must continue with his or her daily activities (i.e., going to classes, sports practices, theatre performances, etc.), assuming a normal outer appearance.

=== Newman's public disapproval ===
Newman strongly opposed the tradition, as he personally struggled with drinking. He called it "abhorrent" and "cruel." While Bates College and Princeton University began to establish the tradition on their campuses, Newman wrote letters to the universities' presidents denouncing the activities around the tradition. In April 2004, he took out a page in The Daily Princetonian, Princeton's college newspaper, to say that the quote was misattributed and to register his disapproval. During an interview with The New York Times, he stated that students at participating universities were free to do what they please, but they shouldn't use his name. He encouraged students to participate in "twenty-three hours of community service followed by a cold one."

He sent a letter to the President of Bates College, Thomas Reynolds on April 20, 1987, in which he said:

Dear Mr. Reynolds:

I was surprised to learn that a day which was held in my honor was actually an excuse for drunkenness, disregard for property, disrespect for people, and deeds of questionable character. That the tradition of these activities has been wisely quashed by those in authority is indeed a relief. I would like to propose that Paul Newman Day be reinstated under somewhat different guidelines; i.e., a day in pursuit of athletic excellence with paid attendance. The proceeds to be returned to the community in ways of your own choosing. I would be grateful to learn if the students find any merit in this. Sincerely, Paul Newman

P.S. My office address is: 500 Park Avenue, New York, NY 10022

Bates along with Princeton quickly disavowed any responsibility for the event, responding that Newman Day is not sponsored, endorsed, or encouraged by the universities and is solely an unofficial event among students.

== See also ==
- Bates College traditions
- Dartmouth College traditions
