= The Chops Passage =

Coordinates: 43.981°N 69.830°W

The Chops Passage is a channel in Sagadahoc County, Maine and is nearby to Chops Point, West Chops Point and Sturgeon Island. Merrymeeting Bay empties into the Kennebec River here before it heads to the Atlantic Ocean. Chop Point School and Chop Point Camp are also located on west Chops Point a Peninsula located at one side of The Chops.

The Chops Passage is close to Goose Cove and Butler Cove, and marks the border between Bath, Maine, and Woolwich, Maine.
