= Seth Hathorn =

American philanthropist (1780–1856)

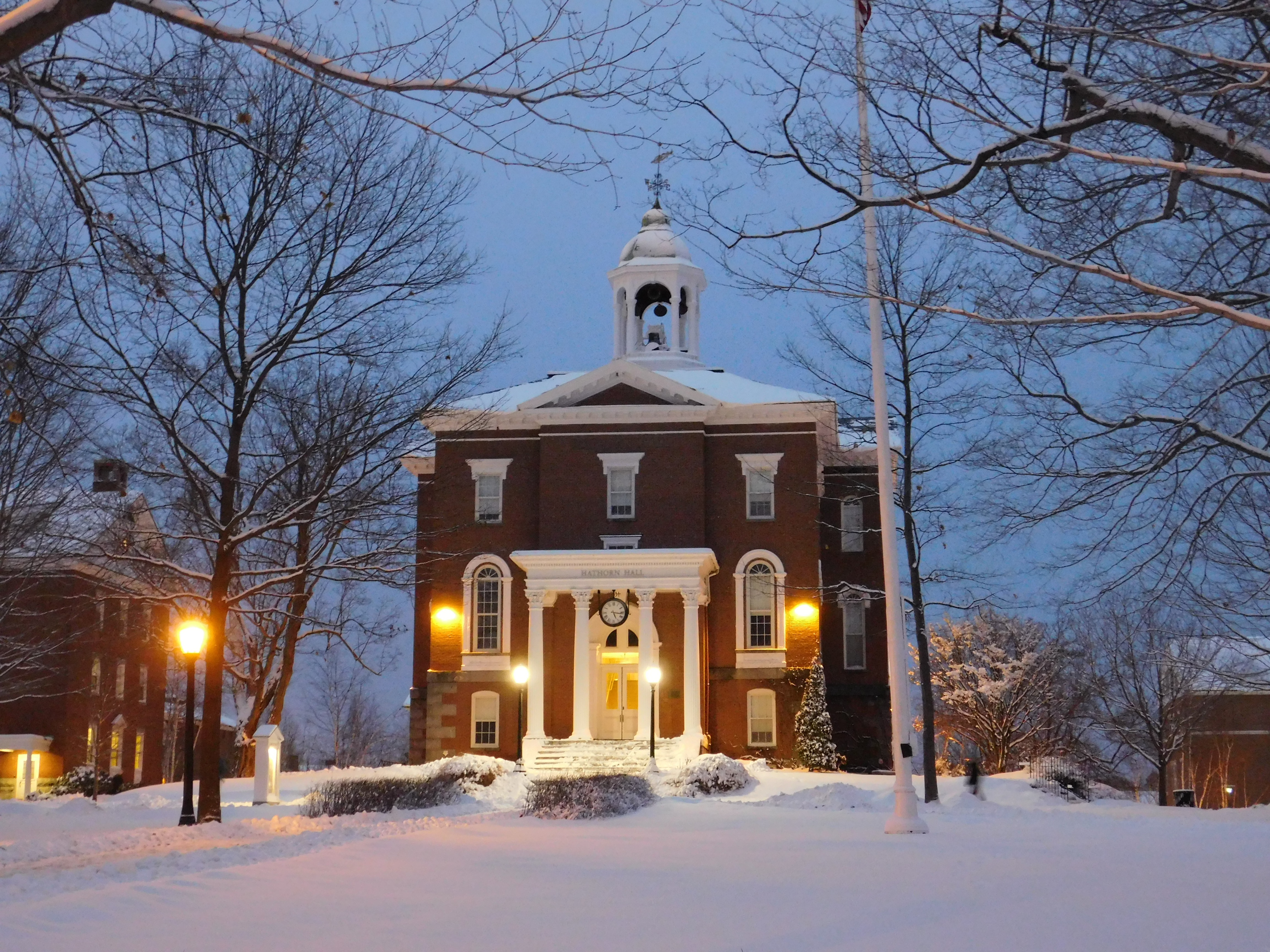
The grounds of Hathorn Hall (built in 1857) at Bates College, 2015

Seth Hathorn (1780–1856) was an American philanthropist from Maine who made large donations to the founding of Bates College, Maine Central Institute, and the University of Maine.

Seth Hathorn was born in Woolwich, Maine (then part of Massachusetts) to John and Tabitha Gowing Hathorne. Hathorn was a grandson of Lieutenant John Hathorne and Esther Wyman Hathorne. He married Mary Hathorne (1781–1868), a daughter of William and Mary Jenkins Hathorne. In 1856 after a conversation with Rev. Oren Cheney, Seth and Mary Hathorn donated $5,000 to construct Hathorn Hall, the first building at Bates College in Lewiston, Maine. At the time of the donation, Mary remarked to Cheney, "I have been hoping and praying that God would open the way for a portion of our property to be disposed of where it would do good after our death. I believe the Lord sent you here." The Hathorns later donated land for the formation of Maine Central Institute and the University of Maine. None of the Hathorns' children lived to adulthood, but their grand-nephew, Henri J. Haskell attended the Bates College's Latin department. After Seth Hathorn's death, his widow, Mary Hathorn, was sued due to his grave becoming a nuisance, and the case was appealed to the Maine Supreme Judicial Court. After her death in 1868, litigation over the use of property she owned was also appealed to the Maine Supreme Judicial Court. Mary Hathorn left a large amount of her estate to the Free Will Baptist Foreign Home Society and Free Will Baptist Foreign Mission Society.
