= Ella Knowles Haskell =

American lawyer (1860–1911)

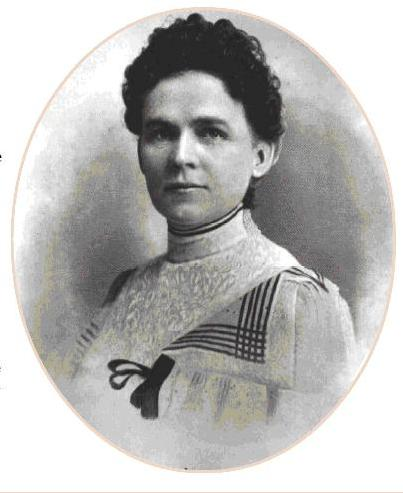
- Born: Ella Lousie Knowles; July 31, 1860; Northwood, New Hampshire
- Died: January 27, 1911 (aged 50); Butte, Montana
- Education: Bates College
- Occupations: Lawyer; Politician; Suffragist
- Known for: 1st woman lawyer in Montana; 1st woman notary public 1st woman candidate for Montana Attorney General; 1st women to argue in front of the United States Supreme Court
- Movement: Women's suffrage in the United States

Ella Knowles Haskell (July 31, 1860 – January 27, 1911) was an American lawyer, suffragist, and politician. Born in New Hampshire, she moved to Montana to improve her health following a bout of tuberculosis and there became the first woman to be licensed as a lawyer, the first female notary public, the first woman to run for Montana State Attorney General, and the 26th woman to be admitted to practice before the US Supreme Court. She served as the President of the Montana Equal Suffrage Association and was widely known in Montana for her advancement of the suffrage movement, political feminism and social equity.

== Early years ==
Ella Lousie Knowles was born on July 31, 1860, in Northwood, New Hampshire. (Note: According to Willard & Livermore (1893), Haskell was born in 1870.) She graduated from Northwood Academy at the age of 15 and then attended Plymouth Normal School for one year. She then taught in country schools for a few years to earn tuition for college.

She attended Bates College, in Lewiston, Maine, where she was the first female editor of the college's student magazine, the Bates Student, and was active in the Debate Society. Bates was one of the few co-educational colleges in the Northeast at that time, and she graduated with honors in 1884.

In her school-days she was noted for her elocutionary powers, and she often gave dramatic entertainments and acted in amateur theatrical organizations. She received her degree of A. M. in June, 1888, from Bates College, and after hesitating between school-teaching and law as a profession, she decided to study law. Upon graduating from the college, she moved to Manchester, New Hampshire, where she studied law with Henry E. Burnham, who was to later become a U.S. senator.

== Career ==
In 1887, she fell ill with tuberculosis and was advised to move to the drier climate of the Montana Territory to improve her health.

She went to Iowa, where she taught classes in French and German in a seminary for a short time, and rhetoric and elocution at Western Normal College. She next went to Salt Lake City, Utah, where she took a position as teacher. While there, she received an offer of a larger salary to return to the Iowa University, in which she had taught. She had seen enough of the Rocky Mountains and of the people of that region to make her willing to remain in the West.

In 1888, she moved to Helena, Montana, and was offered the job of principal at the West Side School. Not long after reaching Helena, she decided to finish her law course, and she entered a law office, reading law in the Helena office of Joseph Kinsley. In that same year, she was appointed a notary public by Governor Leslie, and she was the first woman to hold such an office in Montana. During her first year in Helena, she served as secretary of a lumber company. While studying law, she acted as collector, and then look up attachment and criminal cases, and she received several divorce cases, which she handed over to Kinsley. She lobbied against Montana statutes that governed admission to the bar and prohibited women from practicing. She successfully lobbied the legislature to permit women to be allowed to practice law, which subsequently resulted in the state bill permitting qualified people to practice law "without regard to sex".

In 1889, she was admitted to the bar to practice before the Supreme Court of Montana, becoming the first woman allowed to practice law in Montana. She at once formed a law partnership with Kinsley. On April 18, 1890, she was admitted to practice before the District Court of the United States, and on April 28, 1890, she received credentials that enabled her to practice before the Circuit Court of the United States In 1892, she was nominated for Attorney-General of Montana by the Alliance party.

In 1902, she divorced her husband, and moved to Butte, Montana, where she became a very successful attorney for various mining interests. She went on to argue and win cases before the United States Circuit Court and the United States Supreme Court, the first woman to do so.

=== Political activities ===
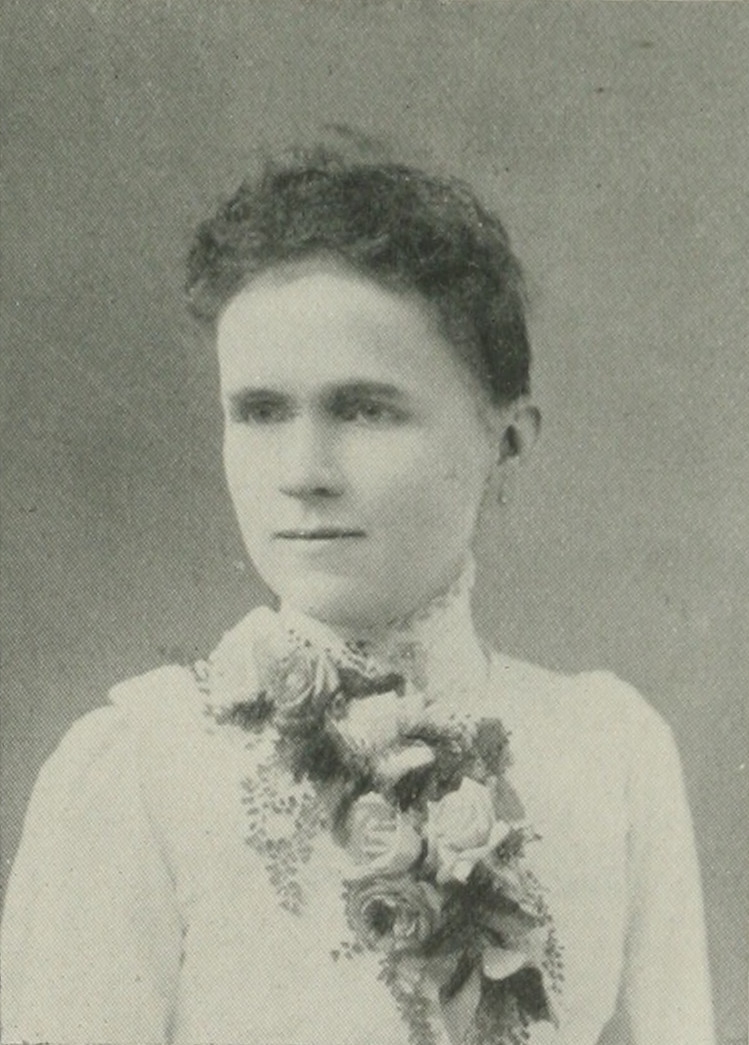
Portrait photo from A Woman of the Century

In 1892, 22 years before Montana women received the right to vote, Knowles ran for state Attorney General after being nominated by the Populist Party, becoming the first woman in the United States to run for that office. She narrowly lost the election, but was nominated to be the Montana Assistant Attorney General by Henri J. Haskell, a Republican who had won the election. Haskell and Knowles later married.

In 1896, Haskell became the first Montana woman to be elected to a national political convention, that of the Populist party. She went on to convince the U.S. Secretary of the Interior, Hoke Smith, to grant Montana $200,000 worth of land for schools near Great Falls.

Throughout her time in Montana, Haskell remained active in the women's suffrage movement. She was a part of the Helena Business Women's Suffrage Club from its inception and was chosen to serve as the President of the Montana Equal Suffrage Association. As the populist movement grew in Montana she remained active and campaigned in support of William Jennings Bryan, for he was chosen as the Democratic nominee for the presidency in 1896.

== Legacy ==
Haskell died in Butte in 1911. The Magistrate Courtroom on the Fourth Floor of the James F. Battin Federal Courthouse in Billings, Montana, is named in her honor.

== See also ==
- List of Bates College people
- List of first women lawyers and judges in Montana
