= Hathorn Hall =

- Hathorn Hall, Bates College
- U.S. National Register of Historic Places
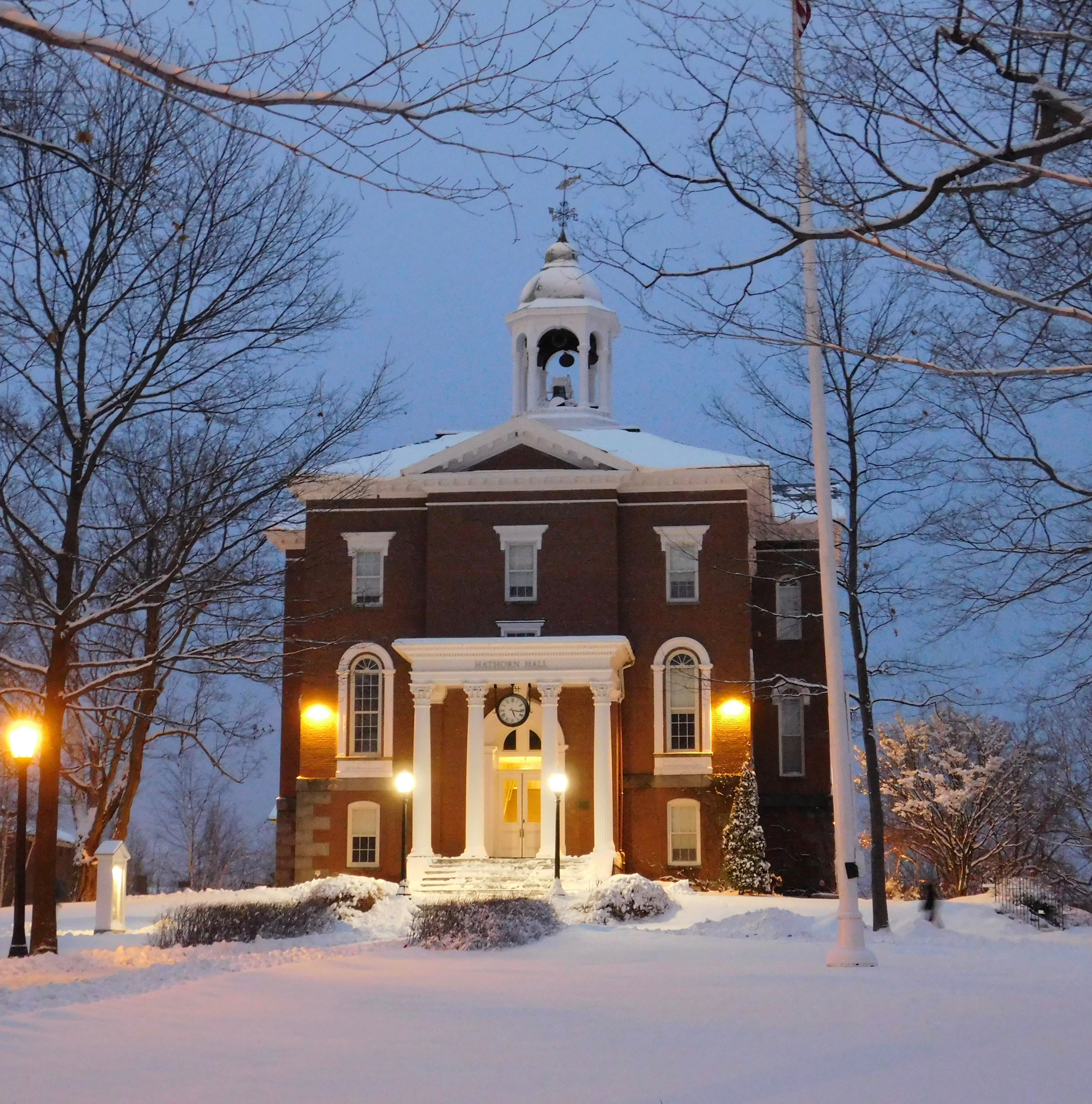
- Hathorn Hall in 2015

- Location within Maine Location within the United States
- Location: Bates College campus, Lewiston, Maine
- Coordinates: 44°6′23″N 70°12′17″W
- Built: 1857
- Architect: Gridley J. F. Bryant
- NRHP reference No.: 70000071
- Added to NRHP: August 25, 1970

Hathorn Hall is a historic academic building on the campus of Bates College in Lewiston, Maine. Built in 1857 to a design by American architect Gridley J.F. Bryant, it was the college's first academic building and library following the move of the Maine State Seminary (as it was then known) from Parsonsfield to Lewiston. The building was listed on the National Register of Historic Places in 1970.

== Description ==
Hathorn Hall is centrally located on the Bates College campus, which is located northeast of Lewiston's commercial downtown area. The hall is a rectangular brick building, three stories in height, with a hip roof capped by a cupola housing an open belfry. Low pedimented gables rise from the short ends of the roof. The gables and the roof's cornice are studded with modillions. Its main entrance, set on one of the short ends, is sheltered by a rectangular flat-roof portico, which has fluted Corinthian columns supporting a full entablature with cornice.

== History ==
Hathorn Hall and Parker Halls were completed in 1857 by Gridley J.F. Bryant as the first buildings on the Bates campus, then called the Maine State Seminary. Bryant also completed the main building on the Tufts University campus in 1852. The building was named after Seth Hathorn and Mary Hathorn of Woolwich, Maine who donated funds for the construction of the building. Jonathan Davis donated the bell in Hathorn's bell tower. Nineteenth century "ivy stones" from early classes at the college are embedded in the brick along the exterior of the building.

Hathorn Hall's interior has changed several times since its original construction. A fire started in the bell tower of Hathorn Hall in 1881 which severely damaged much of the interior of the building, and the interior was again renovated in 1898, 1960–62, and 1984 (with $180,000 from the Pew Foundation). The building was added to the National Register of Historic Places in 1970.

As of 2026, Hathorn Hall is home to Bates' mathematics and foreign language departments and two computer labs.

== Historic images ==
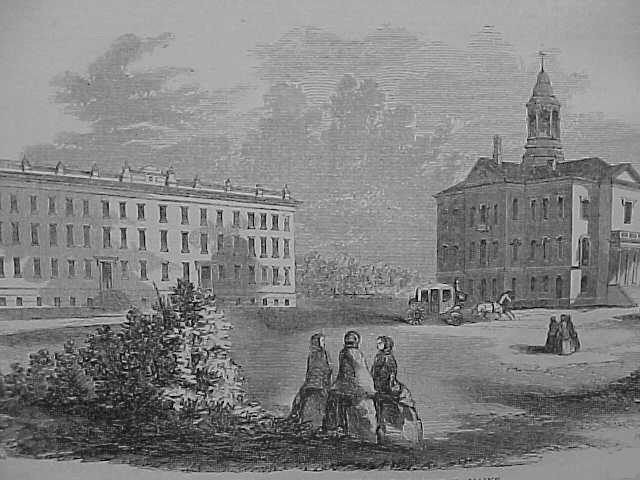
1857 lithograph image of Hathorn and Parker Halls

Hathorn and Parker Halls, 1860s

Planting the ivy and laying the class ivy stone on Ivy Day at Hathorn Hall, 1895

== See also ==
- National Register of Historic Places listings in Androscoggin County, Maine
