= Nequasset Lake =

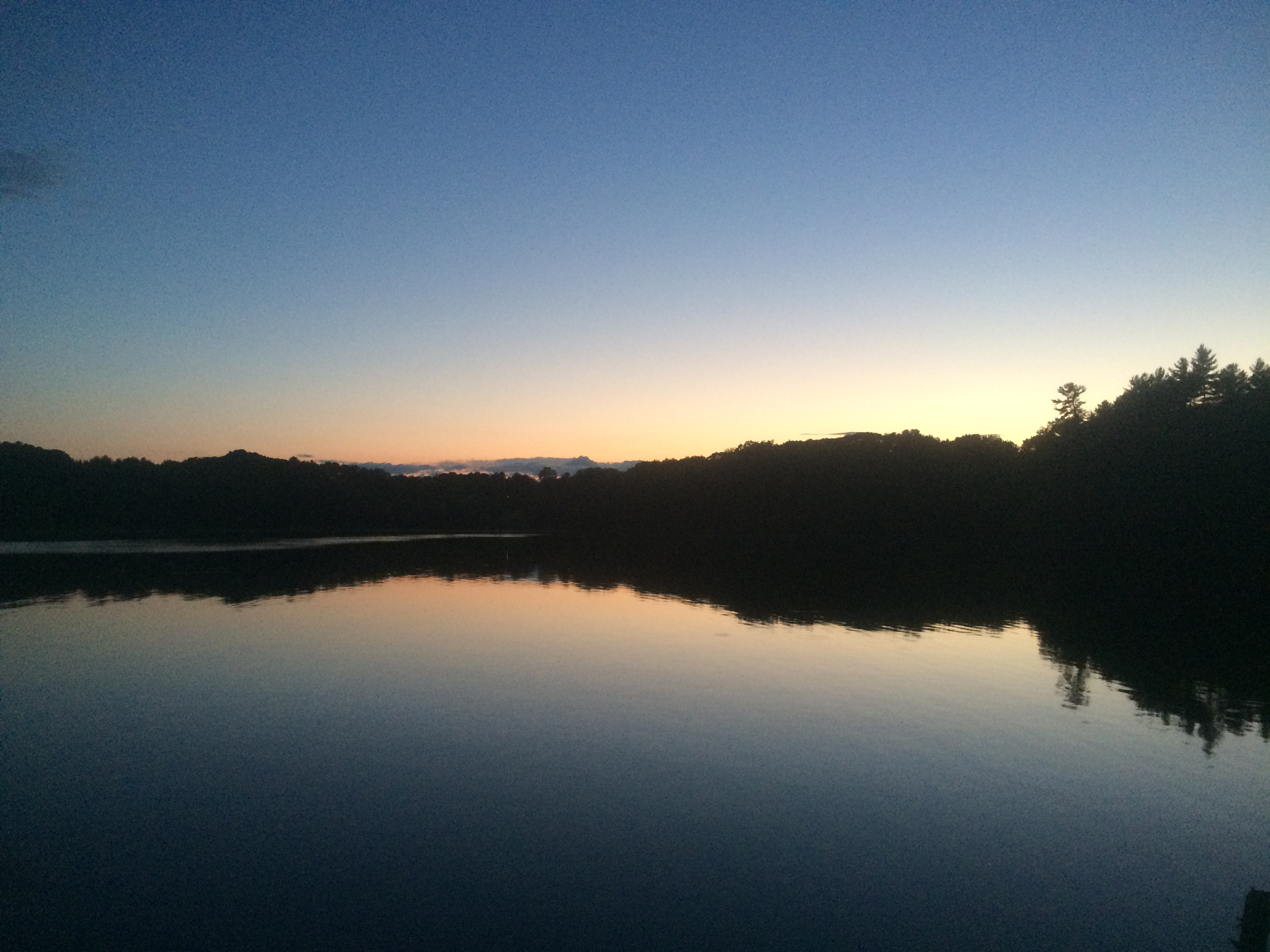
- Sunset on Nequasset Lake

- Location within Maine Location within the United States
- Location: Sagadahoc County, Maine, United States
- Coordinates: 43°57′07″N 69°46′28″W
- Type: Reservoir
- Basin countries: United States
- Surface area: 392 acres (159 ha)
- Max. depth: 63 ft (19 m)
- Surface elevation: 16 ft (5 m)

Nequasset Lake, or Nequasset Pond, is a 392-acre (159 ha), largely undeveloped lake located entirely in the town of Woolwich, Maine.

== Geography ==
Nequasset is a coastal warm-water lake. The shore of the lake is mostly rocky, with multiple sand beaches scattered in coves across the lake. The largest of these beaches is located on the north shore, often referred to as "Sandy Beach" by locals. Multiple rocky points can be found along the shoreline, with at least one small rock island located along the eastern shore. Although the lake's deepest point is 63 feet (19 m), the vast majority of the lake does not reach this depth. The southern end of the lake averages 40 to 50 feet (12 to 15 m) deep and the northern end is much shallower, with few locations deeper than 30 feet (9 m). The lakebed is mostly sand and gravel, though it is covered by a thick layer of branches and leaves due to the lack of development along the shorelines. The water temperature is 72 °F (22 °C) at surface level and 56 °F (13 °C) at 60 feet (18 m). The lake has very low oxygen levels at its deepest points.

== Fish ladder and alewives ==
Nequasset Lake is home to a commercial alewife fishery. Originally built in 1955, the fish ladder found on Nequasset Brook allows for fish to pass into the lake to spawn while also allowing for fish to be harvested. By 2011 the original fish ladder was in inadequate shape. In 2014 a new fish ladder was installed on the site of the old ladder to allow for easier fish passage. In 2015 Nequasset lake had an estimated run of 300,000 alewives.

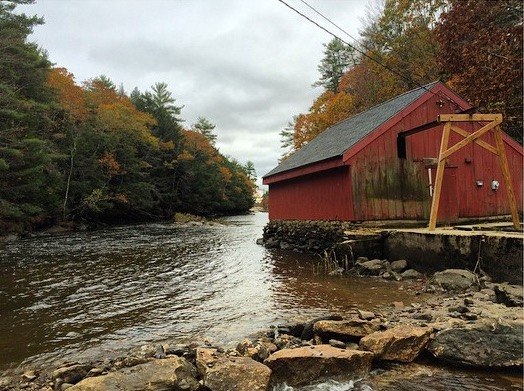
View of smoke house below fish ladder.

== Fishery ==
Nequasset Lake is home to the fish of a typical warm-water lake. These include largemouth bass, smallmouth bass, chain pickerel, white perch, yellow perch, pumpkinseed sunfish, redbreast sunfish, hornpout, eel, and a variety of baitfish. Anglers report largemouth bass in the range of 2–4 pounds with the occasional 5-pound or bigger fish. Bass fishing is most productive in Nequasset Lake from late spring to early fall, with peak fishing in midsummer. The Maine Department of Inland Fisheries & Wildlife annually stocks the lake with brown trout to provide winter anglers with cold-water gamefish during the ice-fishing season. Because of low oxygen levels at the lake's deepest points and high temperatures in shallow water, it is unlikely that any trout hold over into the summer months. Trout can however be caught in the first weeks after iceout.

== Public access ==
Nequasset Lake can be accessed off of Old Stage Road at its northern inlet or at Nequasset Park off of George Wright Road at its southern outlet. Access on the north end is limited by a bridge, which can make passage in a motorized boat difficult when the water level is high. Nequasset Lake is prohibited to motorboats of greater than 10 horsepower because it is a public water supply. Trails leading to rocky points on multiple parts of the lake are present and allow for productive bank fishing.

== Water supply ==
Nequasset Lake is the principal water supply for the Bath Water District, which serves the city of Bath and the southern portion of Woolwich. The lake's water is supplied to 15,000 people in 3,000 homes and buildings. The Bath Water District's pump station is a large brick building situated on the southwest end of the lake. It is the only major structure located on the body of water.
