= Cathance River =

Coordinates: 43.98480°N 69.87977°W

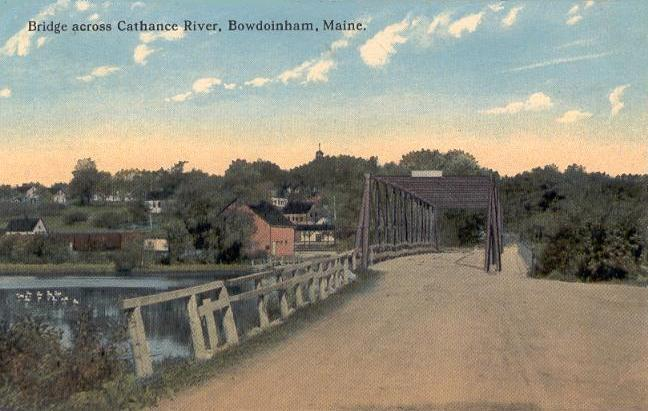
- View at Bowdoinham c. 1912

Location
- Country: United States

Physical characteristics
- Source
  - location: Maine

The Cathance River is a 16.4-mile-long (26.4 km) river in Maine flowing into Merrymeeting Bay.

It rises in Bowdoin at the junction of West Cathance and East Cathance streams and flows south into Topsham. Turning east and then northeast, it reaches tidewater at the village of Cathance within Topsham and continues northeast into the town of Bowdoinham. The river turns south again for its final course to Merrymeeting Bay.

== See also ==
- List of rivers of Maine
