= Henri J. Haskell =

American lawyer (1843–1921)

1st Attorney General of Montana
- In office November 8, 1889 – January 4, 1897
- Governor: Joseph Toole
- Preceded by: John B. Clayberg (territorial attorney general)
- Succeeded by: C. B. Nolan

Member of the Montana Territorial House of Representatives from Dawson County
- In office January 17, 1889 – November 8, 1889
- Preceded by: Charles R. A. Scobey
- Succeeded by: Martin Newcomer (state representative)

Personal details
- Born: Henri James Haskell; July 20, 1843 Palmyra, Maine, U.S.
- Died: March 11, 1921 (aged 77) Glendive, Montana, U.S.
- Party: Republican
- Spouses: Nellie Towle (m. 1883; died 1887); Ella Knowles (m. 1895; div. 1904)
- Education: Bates College
- Occupation: Lawyer; politician

Military service
- Allegiance: United States (Union)
- Branch/service: United States Army
- Years of service: 1862–1865
- Unit: 1st Maine Cavalry Regiment
- Battles/wars: American Civil War

Henri James Haskell (July 20, 1843 – March 11, 1921) was the first Montana Attorney General from 1889 to 1897.

Haskell was born in Palmyra, Maine, in 1843 to Aretas Haskell and Sophia Hathorn (Haskell). He attended Bates College's Nichols Latin School/Maine Central Institute. Haskell was a great-nephew of Seth Hathorn who donated Bates' first building. After serving in the American Civil War with the first Maine Cavalry (including at Gettysburg) and being wounded, Haskell returned to his father's farm in Maine, and then moved to Marysville, California where he read law and was admitted to the bar in 1875. Eventually he moved back to Pittsfield, Maine for a period and then to Glendive, Montana where served as a district attorney. He was elected as a member of Montana Territorial House of Representatives in 1888 and served as a delegate to Montana state constitutional convention in 1889. In 1889 Haskell was elected as the first Montana state attorney general and served until 1897 as a Republican. Haskell was an active Freemason. In the election he defeated Ella Knowles Haskell, whom he later married and then divorced. Henri Haskell died in 1921.

Legal offices
Preceded by office created	Attorney General of Montana; 1889–1897	Succeeded by C. B. Nolan
