= Robert P. Carr House =

Historic house in Maine, United States

- U.S. National Register of Historic Places
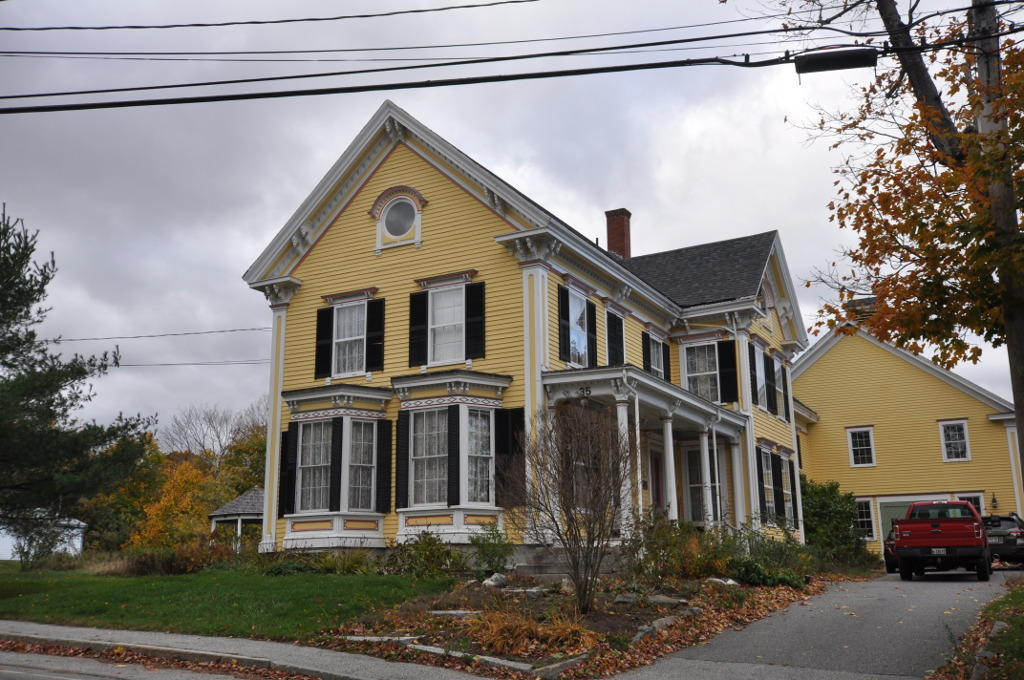

- Location within Maine Location within the United States
- Location: 31 Main St., Bowdoinham, Maine
- Coordinates: 44°0′36″N 69°53′53″W
- Area: less than one acre
- Built: 1870
- Architect: Coombs, George M.
- Architectural style: Italianate
- NRHP reference No.: 90001904
- Added to NRHP: December 18, 1990

The Robert P. Carr House is a historic house at 35 Main Street in Bowdoinham, Maine. It is a high quality area example of Italianate architecture, built about 1870 for one of the town's most prominent citizens of the period. The house was listed on the National Register of Historic Places in 1990.

== Description and history ==
The Robert P. Carr House stands on the north side of Main Street (Maine State Route 125), a short way east of its junction with Center Street and Back Hill Road. It is an L-shaped 2 1/2-story wood-frame structure, with a cross-gable roof, clapboard siding, and granite foundation. Its street-facing front facade is two bays wide, with polygonal bays on the first floor topped by bracketed hip roofs. The building corners have paneled pilasters, rising to an eave studded with paired brackets. The front gable has a deep eave, also with paired brackets and modillions. A round window is at the center of the gable, sheltered by a bracketed hood. The main entrance is on the right side, near the crook of the L, sheltered by a porch. The interior of the house features high quality period woodwork.

The house was built about 1870 for Robert Potter Carr, a prominent local businessman and politician, and is a remarkably high-style Italianate structure for a relative modest rural village setting. Carr was the owner of the local country store, which was established by his father. He is believed to be one of the first people in the town to engage in the business of ice harvesting on a commercial scale. Carr served for many years in the state legislature, and in county-level positions.

== See also ==
- National Register of Historic Places listings in Sagadahoc County, Maine
