= Muddy River (Merrymeeting Bay) =

Coordinates: 43°58′5″N 69°53′15″W

Location
- Country: United States

Physical characteristics
- Source
  - location: Maine
- Mouth
  - elevation: 0 m (0 ft)
- Length: about 4 miles (6 km)

The Muddy River is a 4.7-mile-long (7.6 km) river in Topsham, Maine, which empties into Merrymeeting Bay. The river is known to be very muddy.

== See also ==
- List of rivers of Maine
