= Ivy Day (United States) =

Ceremonial occasion at some colleges

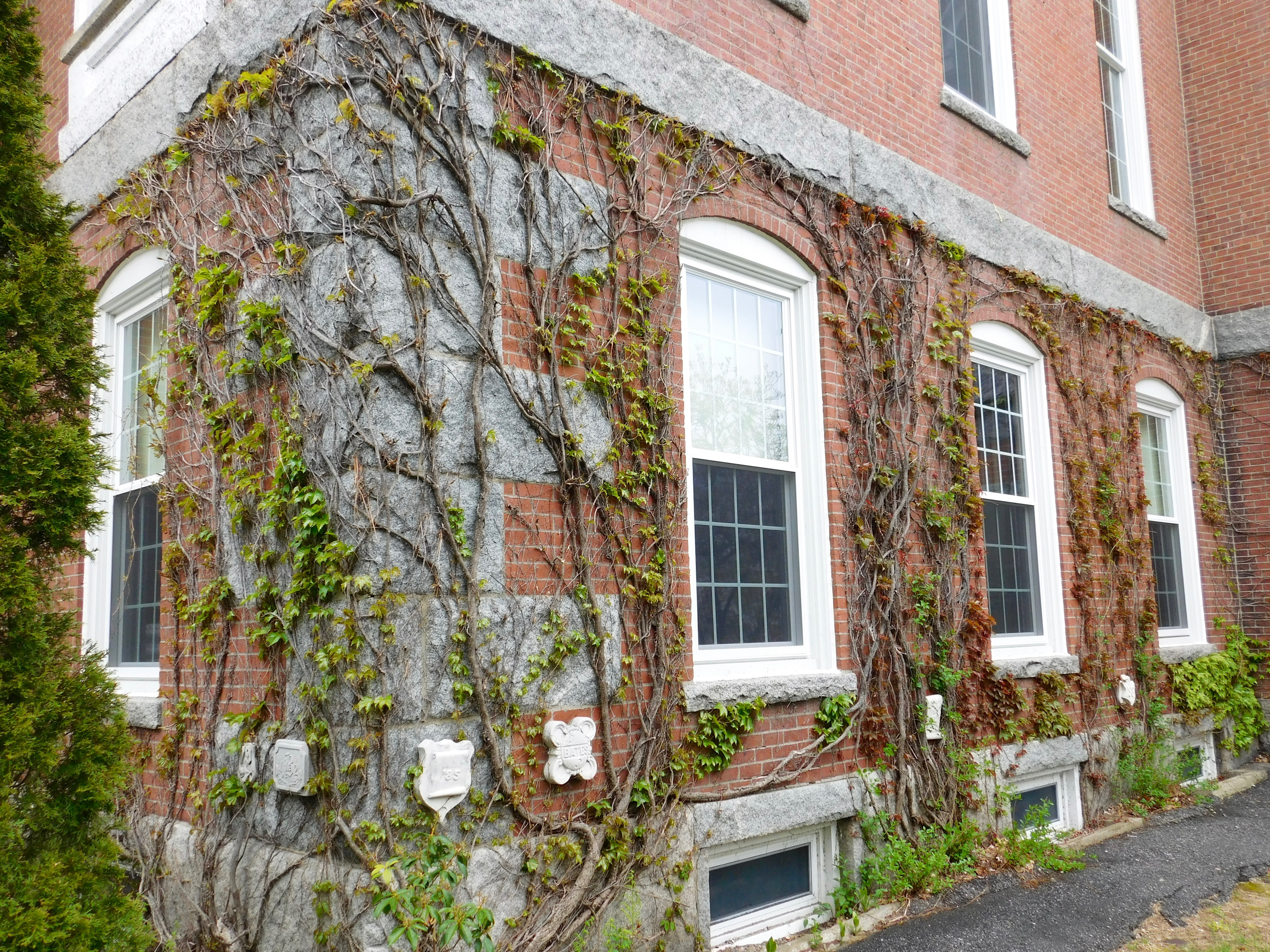
- Ivy growing on the side of Hathorn Hall, featuring respective classes' Ivy Stones
- Named after: The ivy plant, Hedera
- Type: University and college tradition
- Region served: New England, Northeastern United States
- Founded in 1873

Ivy Day is a series of annual ceremonies in which an ivy stone is placed on either a residential, academic or administrative building or ground to commemorate academic excellence. The ceremony is most known for being practiced among older colleges in the Northeastern United States. It is most associated with the Ivy League and a group of small liberal arts college known as the Little Ivies. Some institutions announce members of Phi Beta Kappa and specialized honor designations for students. Some classes donate to the college, in the form of gates, facades, and door outlines, by inscribing or creating their own version of symbolic icons of the college's seal or other prominent insignia. The ivy stones are usually decorated with the graduation date and a symbol that represents the college as a whole or the class as a whole. The most common ivy stone is one-by-two feet and is usually made out of workable stone.

On occasion students have featured prominent alumni on their class on ivy stones or have selected to feature an engraving of a member of their graduating class. Since 1866 at Princeton, and later at other colleges, students have unveiled class ivy stones at the annual ivy day preceding commencement. Students may also have a selective procession prior to the official commencement walk to honor each stone being placed on the buildings. On some occasions students plant ivy in front or on the side of their ivy stones. Students are known to give speeches at Ivy Day to commemorate their time and work at the college. At Tulane University, the medical school also participates in Ivy Day, likely given the fact that Tulane was founded first as a medical school.

Ivy Day events
School	Location	Type	Founding	Years participated	Ivy League	Little Ivy
Bates College	Lewiston, Maine	Private	1855	1879–1973; 1976–present		
Bowdoin College	Brunswick, Maine	Private	1794	1865–present (except 1877)		
Columbia University	New York, New York	Private	1754	1875–1918		
Princeton University	Princeton, New Jersey	Private	1746	1866–present		
Smith College	Northampton, Massachusetts	Private	1871	1884–present		
Tulane University	New Orleans, Louisiana	Private	1834	1909–present		
University of Nebraska–Lincoln	Lincoln, Nebraska	Public	1869	1901–present		
University of Pennsylvania	Philadelphia, Pennsylvania	Private	1740	1873–present		
Williams College	Williamstown, Massachusetts	Private	1793	1862–present		

As part of the modern college admissions process, the term "Ivy Day" also refers to the day in late March where the Ivy League universities release their admissions decisions.
