= Merrymeeting Bay =

Freshwater tidal bay in Maine, United States

Coordinates: 43.9825°N 69.8422°W

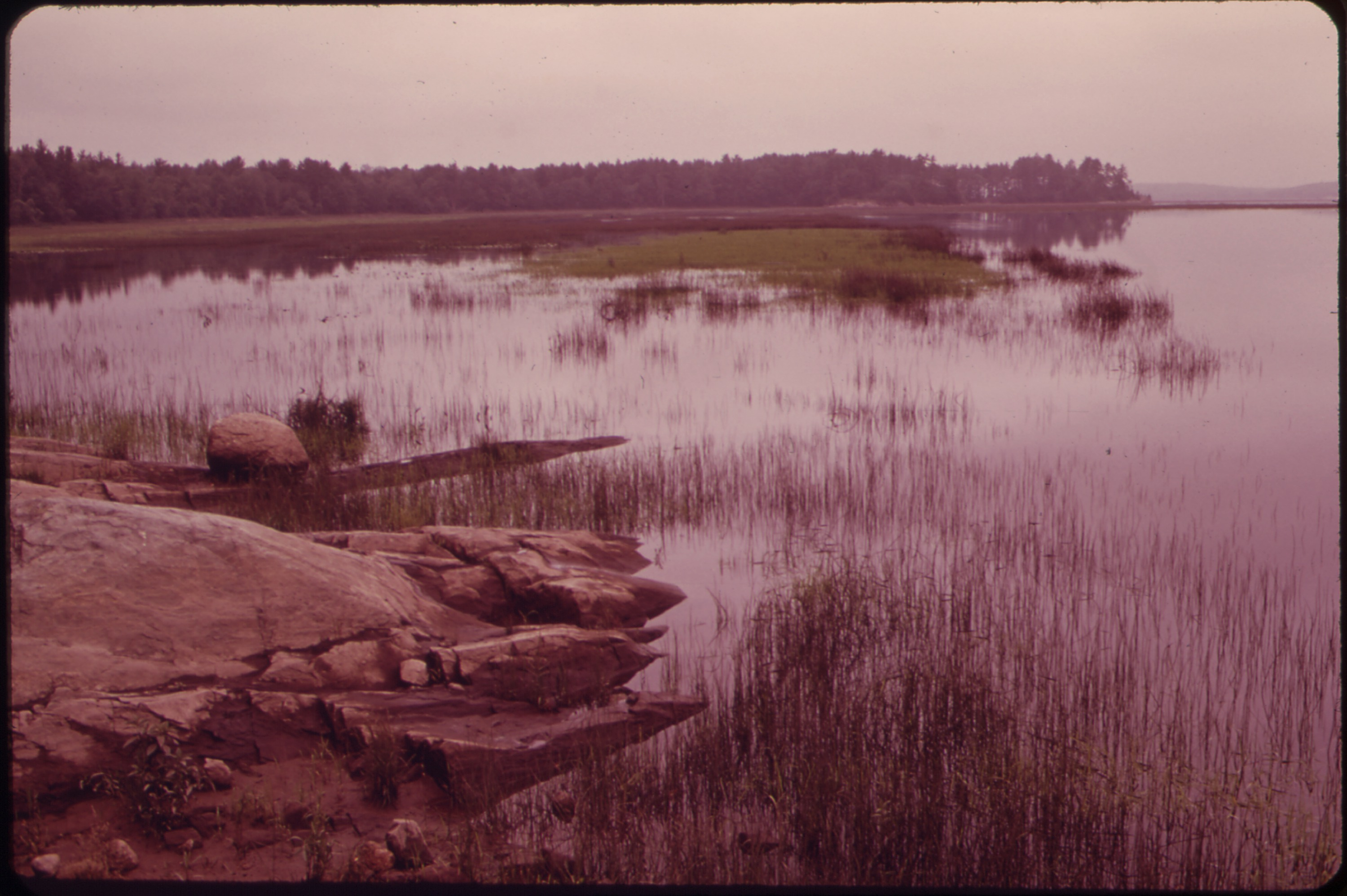
Pleasant Point, in Merrymeeting Bay

Merrymeeting Bay is a large freshwater tidal bay located in the U.S. state of Maine. Merrymeeting Bay's unusual geography defies common landform terms. It is not what is usually meant by the word bay. It is somewhat like an estuary but it has fresh water with very little salt. Geologically it is described as an "inland delta" and biologically as "tidal riverine."

The head of Merrymeeting Bay is generally considered to begin at the southernmost point of Swan Island. Bordering towns and cities include Bath, Brunswick, Topsham, Bowdoinham, Dresden, and Woolwich. Public access to the bay is gained mainly from public docks on one of the contributing rivers in Brunswick, Bath, Richmond, and Bowdoinham.

== Geology ==
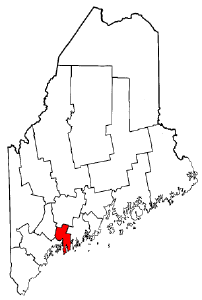
Sagadahoc County within the State of Maine, location of a majority of Merrymeeting Bay.

Six rivers flow into the bay, the two largest being the Kennebec River and the Androscoggin River. The four smaller rivers are the Cathance, Eastern, Abagadasset, and Muddy rivers. The bay receives water from nearly 40% of Maine's land area as well as from part of New Hampshire. The watershed is just under 20,000 square miles (50,000 km^{2}).

Merrymeeting Bay is linked to the Gulf of Maine and the Atlantic Ocean by the Lower Kennebec River, a long saltwater tidal channel. The Lower Kennebec River and Merrymeeting Bay are known collectively as the Kennebec Estuary. Merrymeeting Bay's connection to the Lower Kennebec River is via a 280-yard (260 m) slot in the bedrock called The Chops, an area of converging water flows known to be hazardous to boaters.

The waters of the bay flow out through The Chops at low tide, while high tide brings a mix of fresh water and seawater back up the Kennebec. The river flow volume from six rivers typically exceeds the volume of the incoming tide. Combined with the bottleneck of The Chops, the result is a tidal waterbody with very little salt, known as brackish.

Located about 17 miles (27 km) from the North Atlantic, Merrymeeting Bay has many river delta characteristics. The tides average about 5 feet (1.5 m). The unusual combination of a large body of freshwater and strong tides results in an intertidal habitat that harbors a variety of rare plant species.

== Habitat ==
Large numbers of migrating birds use Merrymeeting Bay as a stopping point along their flyway. For the east coast of the United States, the concentration of waterfowl at Merrymeeting Bay is second only to that at Chesapeake Bay. The bay is also home to a large population of bald eagles.

The strong tidal currents and saltwater in the Lower Kennebec River prevent the river below The Chops or Thorne Head from freezing, making it an ideal wintering habitat for waterfowl. The freshwater in the bay and the Kennebec above The Chops freeze thoroughly. The bay and Kennebec above were once the source of winter ice for a thriving ice harvesting industry. In the early 20th century, Kennebec ice was shipped as far away as India, protected by being packed in sawdust to keep it from melting.

Merrymeeting Bay also supports runs of migratory fish, including the endangered Atlantic salmon and shortnose sturgeon. Other species include Atlantic sturgeon, shad, alewives, American eel, and others.

== History ==
The origin of the name is uncertain. Some suggest that it comes from an Abenaki language term, as this tribe established seasonal camps near the bay. But their name for the bay does not have this meaning. Abenaki names recorded for this bay were Chisapeak ("at the big part of the river") and Quabacook, meaning "duck watering place".

The 17th-century English name for this bay is a symbolic reference to periodic festive gatherings known in the colonial period as "merry meetings" (such as the traditional annual spring fairs in England known as May Fairs when people played games, held archery contests, danced around the maypole, and often got drunk). These "rabble-rousing festivities" were headed by a popular elected leader known as a "Robin Hood," after the mythic leader. Puritans in New England, who were Calvinist Protestants, denounced these folk festivals as vulgar revelries with "light, lewde, and lascivious dancing."

English colonists dismissed the Abenaki on the Lower Kennebec as "wild men," and gave them nicknames, generally derogatory. Chief Rawandagon, the 17th-century sagamore (headman) of the lower Kennebec, including Merrymeeting Bay, was known as Robin Hood. As in the May Fairs, he was said to head a band of "merry men." A village on Georgetown Island on the lower Kennebec was located at the entrance of what was known as Robinhood Cove, named after this chief.

According to historian Frank Burroughs, the name may have been related to the annual springtime rendezvous of fur traders and trappers, at which time drink flowed freely as goods were paid for and exchanged. But he thinks the name was intended to attract a certain kind of English colonist and repel Puritans, as the bay was host to rum importation. Variant early colonial English names of Merrymeeting Bay include New Somerset Lake and Swan Pond.
