= Woolwich, Maine =

- Town
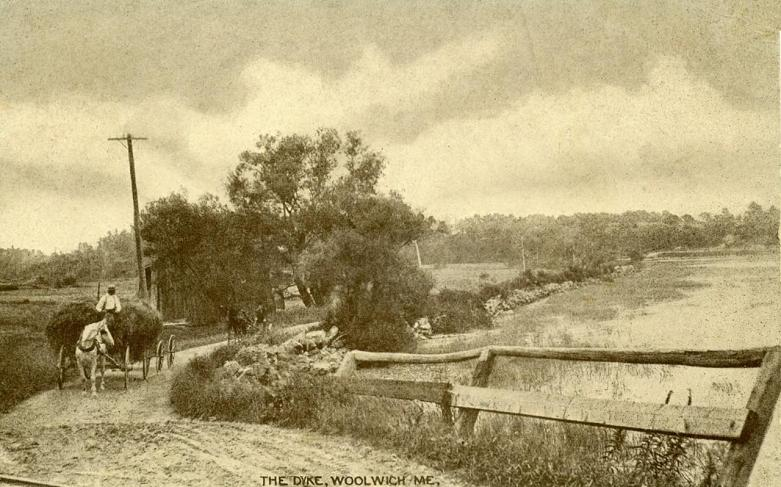
- Country scene in 1912

- Seal

- Location within Maine Location within the United States
- Coordinates: 43°55′07″N 69°48′04″W
- Country: United States
- State: Maine
- County: Sagadahoc
- Incorporated (district): October 20, 1759
- Incorporated (town): August 23, 1775

Area
  - Total: 41.59 sq mi (107.72 km^{2})
  - Land: 35.09 sq mi (90.88 km^{2})
  - Water: 6.50 sq mi (16.83 km^{2})
- Elevation: 56 ft (17 m)

Population (2020)
  - Total: 3,068
  - Density: 88/sq mi (33.8/km^{2})
- Time zone: UTC-5 (Eastern (EST))
  - Summer (DST): UTC-4 (EDT)
- ZIP code: 04579
- Area code: 207
- FIPS code: 23-87460
- GNIS feature ID: 582829
- Website: woolwich.us

Woolwich is a town in Sagadahoc County, Maine, United States. The population was 3,068 at the 2020 census. It is part of the Portland-South Portland-Biddeford metropolitan area. Woolwich is a suburb of the city of Bath located on the opposite shore of Merrymeeting Bay.

== History ==
Called Nequasset after Nequasset Lake by the Abenaki people, it was first settled in 1638 by Edward Bateman and John Brown. They would purchase the land in 1639 from the sachem Mowhotiwormet, commonly known as Chief Robinhood, who lived near Nequasset Falls. At Day's Ferry on the Kennebec River, Richard Hammond operated a fortified trading post. His household of 16, including servants, workmen and stepchildren, conducted a lucrative fur trade with the Indians. But in the first blow of King Philip's War in the area, on the evening of August 13, 1676, warriors ingratiated themselves into the stockaded trading post, then killed the elderly Hammond and his stepson as they returned for the night. Others were either slain and scalped or taken into captivity. Buildings were looted and burned, and the cattle slain.

Nequasset was attacked during King William's War, when inhabitants were again massacred or forced to abandon their homes. It was assailed again in 1723 during Dummer's War, when the Norridgewocks and their 250 Indian allies from Canada, incited by the French missionary Sebastien Rale, burned dwellings and killed cattle. Following Governor William Dummer's peace treaty of 1725, resettlement would be slow. During the French and Indian War, on June 9, 1758, Indians raided the village, killing members of the Preble family and taking others prisoner to Quebec. This incident became known as the last conflict on the Kennebec River.

Nequasset had become a part of Georgetown, but on October 20, 1759, the plantation was set off and incorporated as a separate district by the Massachusetts General Court, named after Woolwich, England. On August 23, 1775 Woolwich was officially incorporated as a town.

The peninsula was heavily wooded, providing timber for shipbuilding. It also had excellent soil for agriculture. By 1858, industries included two sawmills, two gristmills, and a shipyard. By 1886, the community also produced bricks and leather.

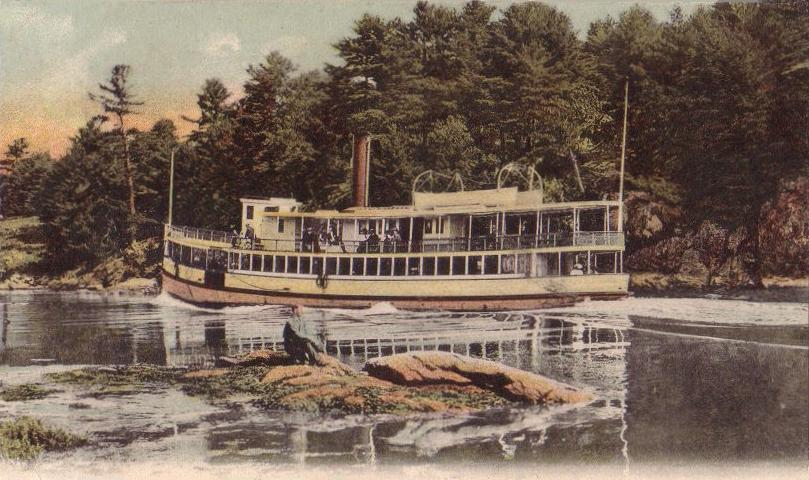
Hell Gate on the Sasanoa River c. 1906

The U. S. Army Corps of Engineers twice widened Upper Hell Gate on the Sasanoa River, which separates Woolwich from Arrowsic. Originally constricted by curves and ledges, which were made even more dangerous by swift currents, the half mile (0.8 kilometer) stretch was widened in 1898 to a minimum of 90 feet (27 meters), then again in 1908 to a minimum of 140 feet (43 meters) and depth of 12 feet (3.7 meters). The Sasanoa River now permits navigation between Bath and Boothbay Harbor.

== Geography ==
According to the United States Census Bureau, the town has a total area of 41.59 square miles (107.72 km^{2}), of which 35.09 square miles (90.88 km^{2}) is land and 6.50 square miles (16.83 km^{2}) is water. Woolwich is situated on a peninsula, with Merrymeeting Bay and the Kennebec River to the west, Sasanoa River to the southwest, and Back River to the southeast.

It is crossed by U. S. Route 1, and state routes 127 and 128. It borders the towns of Dresden to the north and Wiscasset to the east. Separated by water, it is near Bowdoinham to the west, Bath to the southwest, Arrowsic to the south, and Westport to the southeast.

== Demographics ==
Historical population
Census	Pop.	Note	%±
1790	797		—
1800	868		8.9%
1810	1,050		21.0%
1820	1,330		26.7%
1830	1,495		12.4%
1840	1,416		−5.3%
1850	1,420		0.3%
1860	1,317		−7.3%
1870	1,168		−11.3%
1880	1,154		−1.2%
1890	1,007		−12.7%
1900	880		−12.6%
1910	868		−1.4%
1920	875		0.8%
1930	671		−23.3%
1940	1,144		70.5%
1950	1,344		17.5%
1960	1,417		5.4%
1970	1,710		20.7%
1980	2,156		26.1%
1990	2,570		19.2%
2000	2,810		9.3%
2010	3,072		9.3%
2020	3,068		−0.1%
U.S. Decennial Census

=== 2010 census ===
As of the census of 2010, there were 3,072 people, 1,241 households, and 908 families living in the town. The population density was 87.5 inhabitants per square mile (33.8/km^{2}). There were 1,415 housing units at an average density of 40.3 per square mile (15.6/km^{2}). The racial makeup of the town was 96.8% White, 0.3% African American, 0.4% Native American, 0.7% Asian, 0.3% from other races, and 1.7% from two or more races. Hispanic or Latino of any race were 1.1% of the population.

There were 1,241 households, of which 30.1% had children under the age of 18 living with them, 62.6% were married couples living together, 6.6% had a female householder with no husband present, 3.9% had a male householder with no wife present, and 26.8% were non-families. 19.0% of all households were made up of individuals, and 7.2% had someone living alone who was 65 years of age or older. The average household size was 2.48 and the average family size was 2.82.

The median age in the town was 44.6 years. 21% of residents were under the age of 18; 5.4% were between the ages of 18 and 24; 24.5% were from 25 to 44; 33.7% were from 45 to 64; and 15.5% were 65 years of age or older. The gender makeup of the town was 49.4% male and 50.6% female.

=== 2000 census ===
As of the census of 2000, there were 2,810 people, 1,101 households, and 824 families living in the town. The population density was 80.2 inhabitants per square mile (31.0/km^{2}). There were 1,210 housing units at an average density of 34.5 per square mile (13.3/km^{2}). The racial makeup of the town was 97.62% White, 0.36% African American, 0.11% Native American, 0.46% Asian, 0.14% from other races, and 1.32% from two or more races. Hispanic or Latino of any race were 0.82% of the population.

There were 1,101 households, out of which 32.1% had children under the age of 18 living with them, 63.9% were married couples living together, 6.4% had a female householder with no husband present, and 25.1% were non-families. 19.0% of all households were made up of individuals, and 6.1% had someone living alone who was 65 years of age or older. The average household size was 2.55 and the average family size was 2.92.

In the town, the population was spread out, with 23.8% under the age of 18, 6.0% from 18 to 24, 30.1% from 25 to 44, 28.9% from 45 to 64, and 11.2% who were 65 years of age or older. The median age was 40 years. For every 100 females, there were 104.1 males. For every 100 females age 18 and over, there were 102.3 males.

The median income for a household in the town was $41,741, and the median income for a family was $47,984. Males had a median income of $34,673 versus $22,625 for females. The per capita income for the town was $21,097. About 5.6% of families and 6.1% of the population were below the poverty line, including 6.5% of those under age 18 and 6.1% of those age 65 or over.

== Education ==
The town is home to one school serving grades K–8, Woolwich Central School, which is a part of RSU 1. Ninth through twelfth grade students attend Morse High School in Bath. Woolwich is also home to Chop Point School, a small, private K–12 Christian school.

== Sites of interest ==
- Robert P. Tristram Coffin Wildflower Sanctuary
- Montsweag Preserve
- Woolwich Historical Society & Museum

== Notable people ==
- Wilmot Brookings, pioneer, judge, politician
- John W. Brown, union leader
- Seth Hathorn, early donor to Bates College, University of Maine, and Maine Central Institute
- Isaiah H. Hedge, MD, early donor to Bates College, physician
- Allison Hepler, state legislator and resident of Woolwich
- Sir William Phips, colonial governor of Massachusetts
- Carlton Day Reed Jr., President of the Senate
- Novella Jewell Trott (1846–1929), author and editor
