= Abagadasset River =

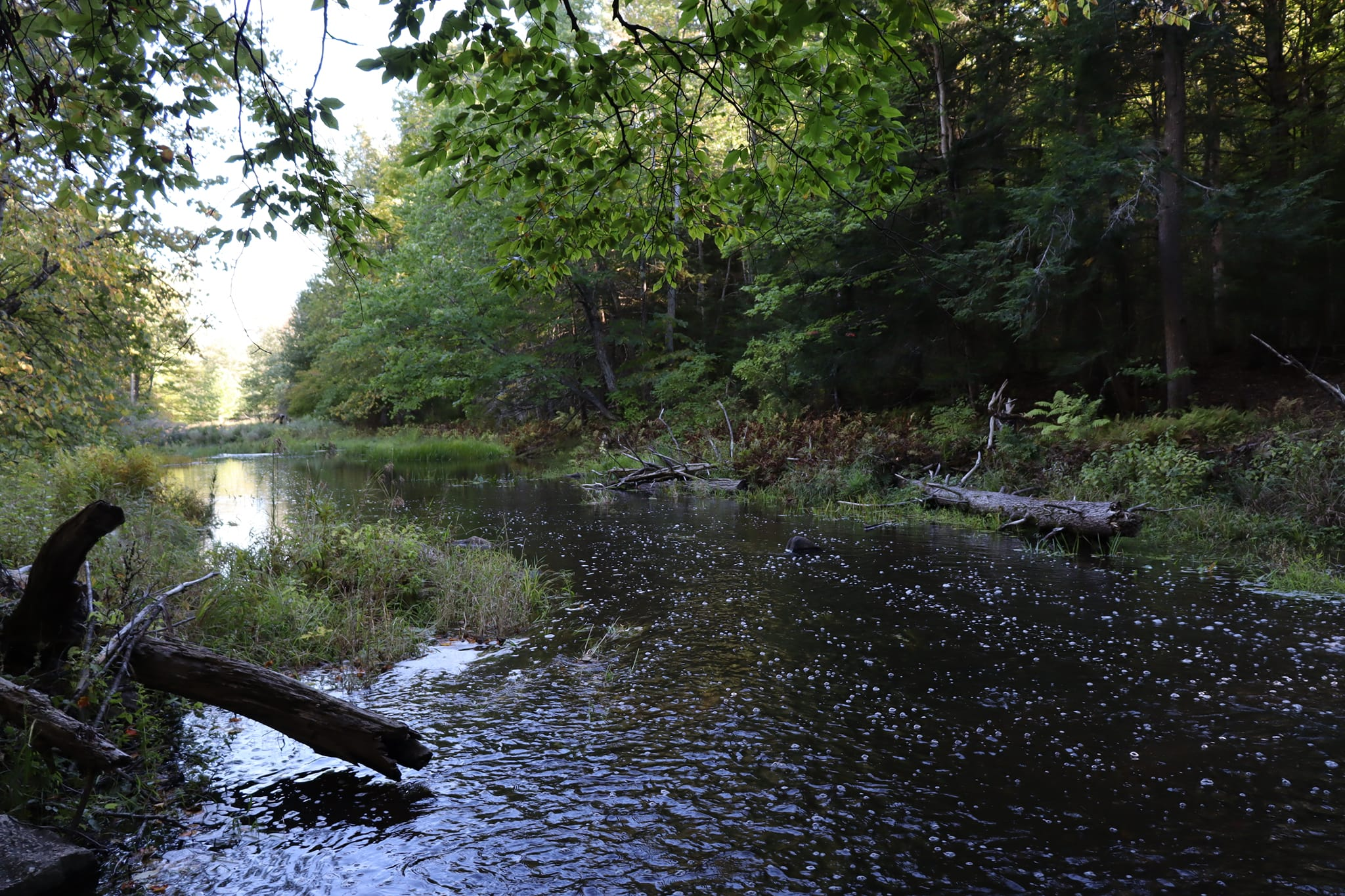
- The Abagadasset in September 2022

- Location of Abagadasset River mouth Abagadasset River (the United States)

Location
- Country: United States
- State: Maine
- County: Sagadahoc

Physical characteristics
- Source: Cobbosseecontee Stream divide
  - location: about 0.1 miles south of Libby Hill, Maine
  - coordinates: 44°09′31″N 069°50′31″W
  - elevation: 280 ft (85 m)
- Mouth: Kennebec River
  - location: about 1.5 miles west of Chops Crossroads, Maine at Merrymeeting Bay
  - coordinates: 44°00′35″N 069°51′06″W
  - elevation: 0 ft (0 m)
- Length: 13.52 mi (21.76 km)
- Basin size: 20.86 square miles (54.0 km^{2})
- Discharge
  - location: Kennebec River
  - average: 38.20 cu ft/s (1.082 m^{3}/s) at mouth with Kennebec River

Basin features
- Progression: generally south
- River system: Kennebec River
- Tributaries
  - left: Baker Brook
- Bridges: I-295, Beedle Road, Alexander Reed Road, Langdon Road, ME 197, Carding Machine Road, ME 24, Browns Point Road

The Abagadasset River is a 16 mile (25.7 km) long tributary of the Kennebec River entirely in Sagadahoc County, Maine. The river starts just south of Gardiner, and flows into Merrymeeting Bay.

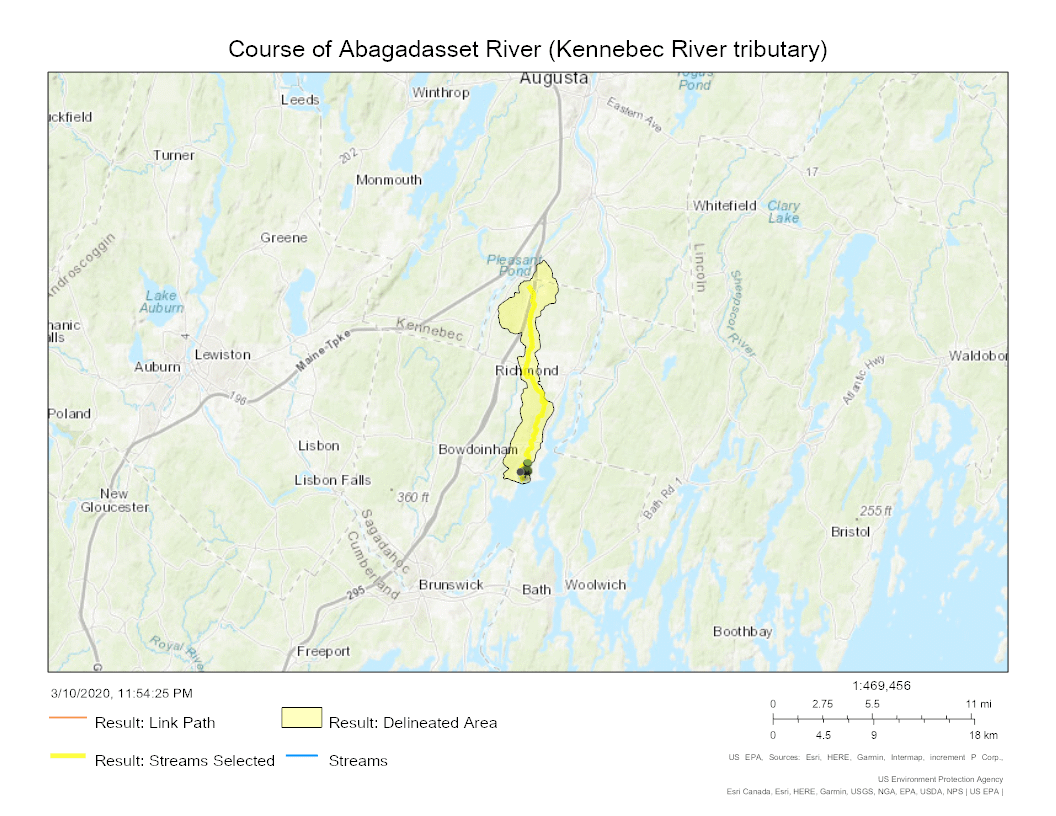
Course of Abagadasset River

== See also ==
- List of rivers of Maine
