= Orrington Lunt =

American merchant and philanthropist (1815–1897)

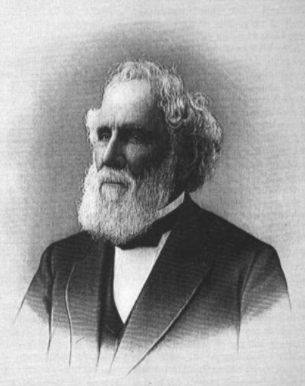
- Born: December 24, 1815; Bowdoinham, Maine, U.S.
- Died: April 5, 1897 (aged 81); Evanston, Illinois, U.S.
- Burial place: Rosehill Cemetery
- Occupations: Merchant, university president
- Spouse: Cornelia A. Gray (m. 1842)
- Children: 3

Orrington Lunt (1815–1897) was an American merchant. He was one of the founders of Northwestern University in Evanston, Illinois and was known as the "father of Evanston" or the "discoverer of Evanston". He was also actively involved with the Garrett Biblical Institute and the Methodist Church.

== Early life ==
Orrington Lunt was born in Bowdoinham, Maine on December 24, 1815, the son of a merchant, William Lunt. He descends from an Englishman Henry Lunt who settled in Newburyport, Massachusetts in 1635. He began working at his father's store as a clerk.

== Career ==
=== Grain merchant ===
When he reached the age of majority, Lunt became a partner with his father. After his father died a few years later, Lunt and his brother were partners in the business. When the business was not sustainable, he decided to sell the business and moved to Chicago in November 1842. He began his career in Chicago as a commission merchant, dealing in produce and grain. In 1845, he established a warehouse near the waterfront for storing grain. He became a member of the Board of Trade. When the railroads came to Chicago in 1853, it dramatically altered the way in which he would do business. He took a break until 1859 and worked as a grain merchant until 1862.

=== Investments ===
Lunt invested in real estate, railroad, and municipal efforts.

=== Community and civic efforts ===
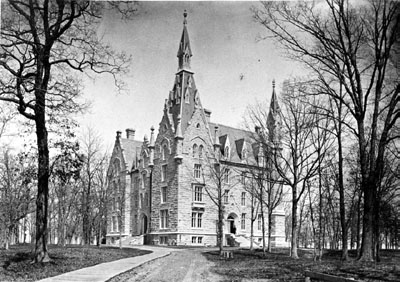
University Hall at Northwestern University as it appeared in 1877

He was a founder, a trustee, and president of Northwestern University in Evanston, Illinois. He was also treasurer and secretary of Garrett Biblical Institute.

After he retired in 1862, he spent most of his time on charitable, education, and religious efforts. During the Civil War, he had a leadership role in organizing and supplying regiments and was a leader of the Committee of Safety and War Finance.

The Northwestern University and Garrett Biblical Institute campuses were not damaged as the result of the Great Chicago Fire of October 1871. But, he marshalled efforts to assess and address the needs following the fire.

== Personal life ==
Lunt was married to Cornelia A. Gray (1819–1909), the daughter of Samuel Gray of Bowdoinham, in 1842. They moved to Chicago in 1842. Cornelia and Orrington had three children. Cornelia Gray Lunt was born on March 19, 1843, in Chicago and attended boarding school in Newburyport, Massachusetts and then the Dearborn Seminary and Chicago Central High School in Chicago. She completed her education at a finishing school, Van Norman Institute, in New York City. Horace was born in 1847 and George was born in 1850. Horace became a judge by 1897.

The Lunts' home was destroyed during the Great Chicago Fire of October 1871. The family moved to Evanston, Illinois, in 1872. Cornelia called their new house Anchorfast.

== Later years and death ==
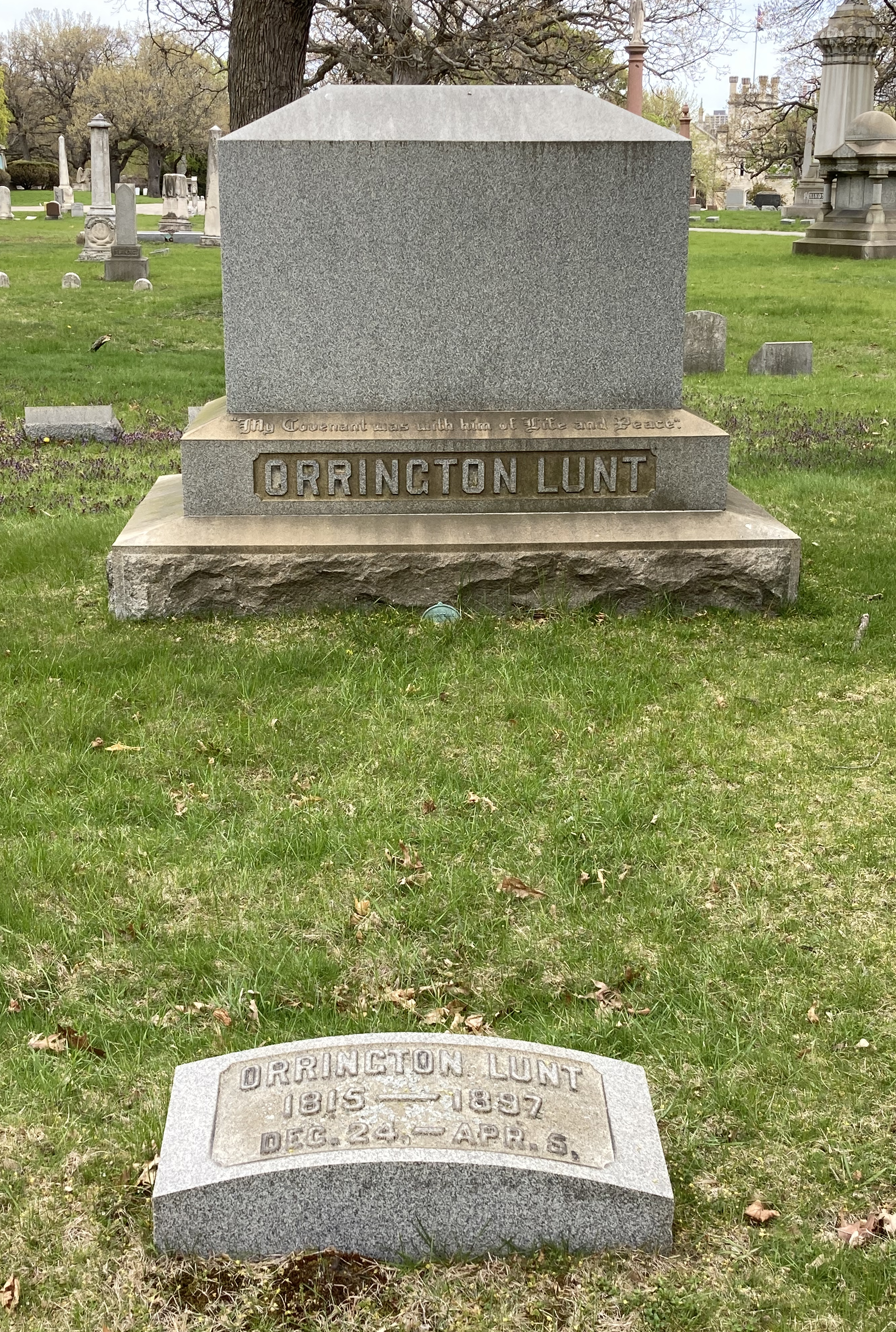
Lunt's grave at Rosehill Cemetery

His health began failing in late 1894 and he died after 10 days of illness due to heart disease on April 5, 1897. He was buried at Rosehill Cemetery in Chicago.

At the time of his death, Cornelia and Horace were his only surviving children. His son, George, died in 1895 when taking care of his father.

== Legacy ==
The Orrington Lunt Library on the Northwestern University campus is named for him, as is Orrington Avenue in Evanston.
