= The Bates Student =

Student newspaper of Bates College

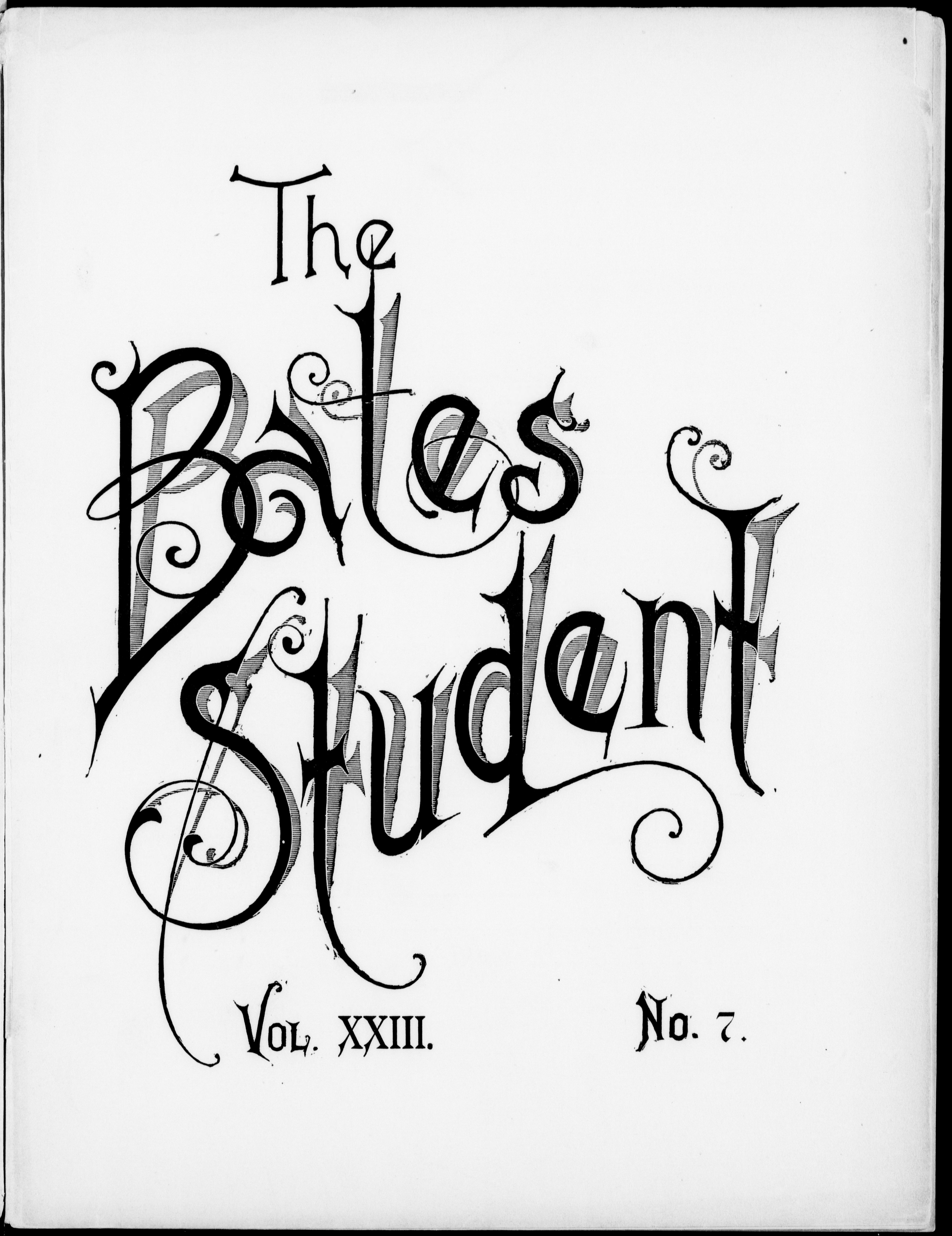
- Bates Student cover from the 1890
- Type: Weekly student newspaper
- Owner: Bates College
- Editor-in-chief: Trinity Poon & Carly Philpott
- Founded: 1873
- Language: English
- Headquarters: Lewiston, Maine
- Website: thebatesstudent.com

The Bates Student, established in 1873, is the newspaper of Bates College in Lewiston, Maine, run entirely by students. It is one of the oldest continuously published college weeklies in the United States and claims to be the oldest co-ed college weekly in the nation.

== Circulation ==
Approximately 1,900 copies of The Student are printed every week and distributed to hundreds of alumni, parents, and other friends of the college. The paper is published each Wednesday while classes are in session and can be found in distribution boxes located in Common, Ladd Library, Pettingill Hall, the Den and Post and Print. Faculty and staff also have the option to request copies delivered through intercampus mail. The Student has been intermittently online since the late 1990s. Once a year, usually at the end of the year, The Student runs a spoof edition commonly known as the "Bates Spudent".

== History ==
The Bates Student was founded as a combination of the college's newspaper and literary magazine and as a successor to earlier publications such as the Seminary Advocate (1855–1863) and College Courant (ca. 1864–1872). The Bates Student was founded in 1873 in the years following the Civil War. It describes itself as "the nation's oldest continuously co-ed college weekly," although this assertion has been contested. Since many college newspapers were founded around the same time, there have been competing claims for which one was the oldest or the first in the United States. For example, The Bowdoin Orient, founded two years earlier in 1871, claims to be the "oldest continuously-published college weekly", but Bowdoin was an all-male school; the Yale Daily News claims to be the "oldest college daily"; the Harvard Crimson, also founded in 1873, claims to "the nation's oldest continuously published daily college newspaper"; The Dartmouth began in 1843 as a monthly and tries to claim institutional continuity with a local eighteenth-century paper called the Dartmouth Gazette. Accordingly, The Bates Student has claimed that it is the oldest continuously published weekly newspaper from a co-educational college. In the late 19th century, the paper was published on a bi-weekly basis, and in the early 20th century, it was published on a weekly basis. It has been published continuously and without interruption during each academic year since 1873.

Among its earliest editors and writers in the 1870s were African Americans and women. The paper was originally formatted in a smaller literary magazine layout and included literary works such as poems and fiction alongside news reports. In 1879, the literary society formed a separate publication called The Garnet, and thereafter The Student focused primarily on news. In the early twentieth century, the paper abandoned the smaller literary magazine format and adopted a larger broadsheet layout.

Archives are kept at the offices of The Bates Student (with issues dating back to 1873) as well as in the college's library: the Edmund S. Muskie Archives and Special Collection Library has a nearly complete archive of past issues in print form. The library also has issues of the Seminary Advocate and College Courant dating back to the 1850s and 1860s.

Generally The Bates Student has been the college's primary newspaper, although it had some competition when The John Galt Press was being published. The Maine College Republicans and Democrats also distributed their own college newspapers in the past, but these have not been published for many years.

In 2021, a group of students created a petition accusing the college administration of forcing The Student to remove an article which detailed alleged anti-union actions by the college and replacing it with an article that focused on anti-union arguments. The newspaper published a statement refuting these claims, stating that it was "not coerced or censored by any member of the Bates administration, the Bates Communication Office, or any other member of the Bates community in the writing or republishing" of the article.

== Notable student writers and editors ==
- Henry Chandler, early African American politician and attorney
- Lewis Penick Clinton, Bassa prince and African missionary
- Louis B. Costello, Maine newspaperman
- Bryant Gumbel, sports columnist and broadcaster
- Ella Knowles Haskell, Attorney, and first woman to argue a U.S. Supreme Court case
- Carolyn Ryan, Managing Editor at the New York Times
