= Pittston Congregational Church =

Historic church in Maine, United States

- U.S. National Register of Historic Places
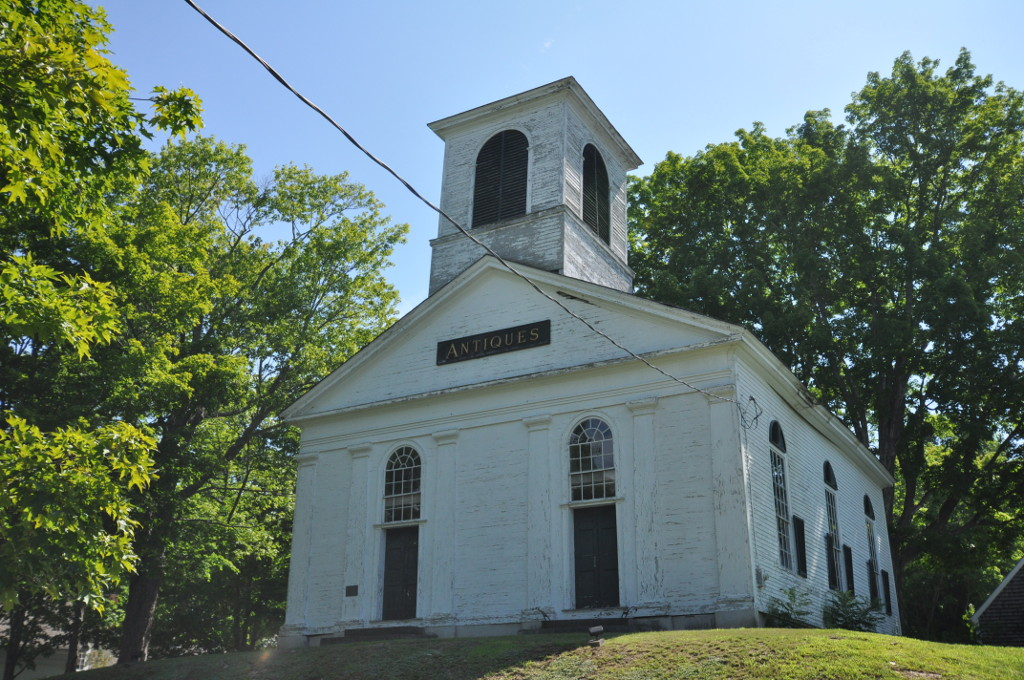

- Location within Maine Location within the United States
- Location: Pittston School Rd., near the junction of ME 27 and ME 194, Pittston, Maine
- Coordinates: 44°13′2″N 69°45′19″W
- Area: 0.5 acres (0.20 ha)
- Built: 1836
- Architectural style: Greek Revival, Federal, Gothic Revival
- NRHP reference No.: 78000179
- Added to NRHP: January 31, 1978

The Old Pittston Congregational Church (also previously known as the First Congregational Church of Pittston) is a historic church building on Pittston School Street in Pittston, Maine. Built in 1836, it is an architecturally distinctive blend of Federal, Greek Revival, and Gothic Revival architecture, and was listed on the National Register of Historic Places in 1978. The congregation, organized in 1812 by Major Reuben Colburn, now meets at 21 Arnold Road. It is affiliated with the Conservative Congregational Christian Conference.

== Description and history ==
The Old Pittston Congregational Church stands in a small crossroads village south of the main village of Pittston. It is located on the east side of Pittston School Street (a former alignment of Maine State Route 27), just north of its junction with East Pittston Road (Maine State Route 194), and northeast of that road's junction with the current alignment of SR 27. It is a 1-1/2 story rectangular wood frame building, with a gabled roof, clapboard siding, and granite foundation. The front facade, facing west, has six Doric pilasters supporting an entablature, with a fully pedimented gable above. There are two doorways between two pairs of pilasters, each topped by a sash window with a fixed rounded top. Similar windows adorn the building sides. Rising from the roof is a two-stage square tower, its upper stage housing a belfry with round-arch louvered openings.

Pittston's First Congregational Church was organized in 1812 by Major Reuben Colburn, who lived to the south, and is best known for his work assisting Benedict Arnold's expedition to Quebec in the American Revolutionary War. This church was built in 1836, and represents a distinctive blending of architectural styles. Its basic form is Federal, but its facade has Greek Revival elements, with Gothic style windows. Historic documentation indicates that the church tower was once adorned by corner pinnacles, also a Gothic feature. The building was used by the congregation until 1894, when it relocated to a more centrally located facility. The congregation currently meets at 21 Arnold Road, just north of the Major Reuben Colburn House.

== See also ==
- National Register of Historic Places listings in Kennebec County, Maine
