= Patriot on the Kennebec =

First edition (publ The History Press)

Patriot on the Kennebec: Major Reuben Colburn, Benedict Arnold and the March to Quebec 1775, is a historical narrative by Mark A. York published on February 17, 2012 by The History Press of Charleston, South Carolina. The book tells the story of Benedict Arnold's expedition to Quebec from the point of view of Reuben Colburn, the much-maligned planner and boatbuilder enlisted by George Washington to supply and guide the ill-fated mission through the Maine wilderness to capture British-held Quebec City in the early months of the American Revolution.
