= Eastern River =

Coordinates: 44.05008°N 69.77755°W

- The river in Dresden, Maine

Location
- Country: United States

Physical characteristics
- Source
  - location: Pittston, Maine
- Mouth
  - location: Dresden, Maine

The Eastern River is a 14.0-mile-long (22.5 km) tributary of the Kennebec River in Pittston and Dresden, Maine. The river rises in Eastern Pittston at the confluence of its east and west branches and flows southwest to its mouth at the Kennebec in Southern Dresden.

== See also ==
- List of rivers of Maine
