= Albert Jewett =

Albert Jewett may refer to:

- Albert G. Jewett (1802–1885), American lawyer and diplomat
- Albert B. Jewett (1829–1887), American businessman and military officer
