= East Branch Eastern River =

River in Maine, US

- Mouth of the East Branch Eastern River in Maine

Location
- Country: United States

Physical characteristics
- Source
  - location: Maine
- Mouth
  - coordinates: 44.17729°N 69.66977°W

The East Branch Eastern River is a 6.5-mile-long (10.5 km) river in Maine. It is part of the Kennebec River watershed. It rises in the town of Whitefield and flows southwest to its confluence with the West Branch Eastern River at East Pittston to form the Eastern River.

== See also ==
- List of rivers of Maine
