= West Branch Eastern River =

River in Maine, United States

Coordinates: 44.17702°N 69.66949°W

- The river in Pittston, Maine

Location
- Country: United States

Physical characteristics
- Source
  - location: Windsor, Maine
- Mouth
  - location: Pittston, Maine

The West Branch Eastern River is a 10.4-mile-long (16.7 km) tributary of the Eastern River in Maine. It is part of the Kennebec River watershed. The West Branch begins near South Windsor and flows southwest through the town of Whitefield, joining the East Branch at East Pittston to form the Eastern River.

== See also ==
- List of rivers of Maine
