= Daniel T. Jewett =

American lawyer and politician (1807–1906)

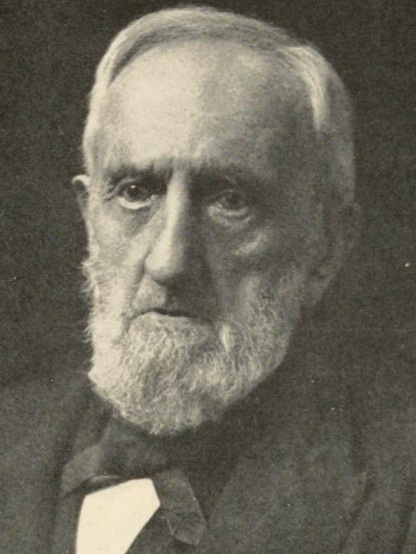
- Jewett in 1906

United States Senator from Missouri
- In office December 19, 1870 – January 20, 1871
- Appointed by: Joseph W. McClurg
- Preceded by: Charles D. Drake
- Succeeded by: Francis P. Blair Jr.

Member of the Missouri House of Representatives
- In office 1866

Personal details
- Born: Daniel Tarbox Jewett; September 14, 1807 Pittston, Maine, US
- Died: October 7, 1906 (aged 99) St. Louis, Missouri, US
- Resting place: Bellefontaine Cemetery
- Party: Republican
- Relations: Albert G. Jewett (brother)
- Occupation: Politician, lawyer

Daniel Tarbox Jewett (September 14, 1807 – October 7, 1906) was an American lawyer and politician. A Republican, he was a member of the United States Senate from Missouri.

== Early life and education ==
Jewett was born on September 14, 1807, in Pittston, Maine. A descendent of Pilgrims, his parents were Daniel Jewett and Nancy (née Tarbox) Jewett. His brother was diplomat Albert G. Jewett. Following his preparatory education, he studied at Colby College and Columbia College, graduating from the latter in 1830 and then studying at Harvard Law School.

== Career ==
After being admitted to the bar, Jewett practiced law in Bangor, Maine. From 1834 to 1837, he served as Bangor's solicitor.

Between 1850 and 1853, Jewett and a brother of his operated a steamboat business for the Chagres River. He lived in California from 1853 to 1855, where he participated in the California gold rush. Afterward, he continued practicing law in Bangor, and in 1857, moved to St. Louis, practicing law there also. In 1858, he represented five unpaid railroad engineers in the United States District Court for the Southern District of Illinois, against the stockholders of the company they worked for; Abraham Lincoln represented the stockholders. In four of the five lawsuits, judge Samuel H. Treat ruled in Jewett's favor.

During the American Civil War, Jewett supported the Union, though was too old to serve in the military. He was a Republican. In 1886, he was a member of the Missouri House of Representatives. Following the resignation of United States senator Charles D. Drake, he was appointed by Governor Joseph W. McClurg to the United States Senate. He served from December 19, 1870, to January 20, 1871, after which he refused the opportunity to run for re-election.

== Personal life and death ==
After serving in Congress, Jewett returned to practicing law in St. Louis. He remained physcially capable in his later life, with him unassistedly visiting his law office daily at age 99. He played chess, including between Treat and Lincoln. During one game against Lincoln, Tad Lincoln knocked the chessboard after his father ignored him.

On December 1, 1848, Jewett married Sarah Wilson, daughter of politician John Wilson and sister of Hannah Wilson, who married his brother Albert. He died on October 7, 1906, aged 99, in St. Louis, and is buried in Bellefontaine Cemetery.

U.S. Senate
Preceded by Charles D. Drake	U.S. senator (Class 3) from Missouri; December 19, 1870 – January 20, 1871; Served alongside: Carl Schurz	Succeeded by Francis P. Blair Jr.
Honorary titles
Preceded by James W. Bradbury	Oldest living U.S. senator January 6, 1901 – October 7, 1906	Succeeded by Edmund Pettus
