= Pownalborough Courthouse =

- U.S. National Register of Historic Places
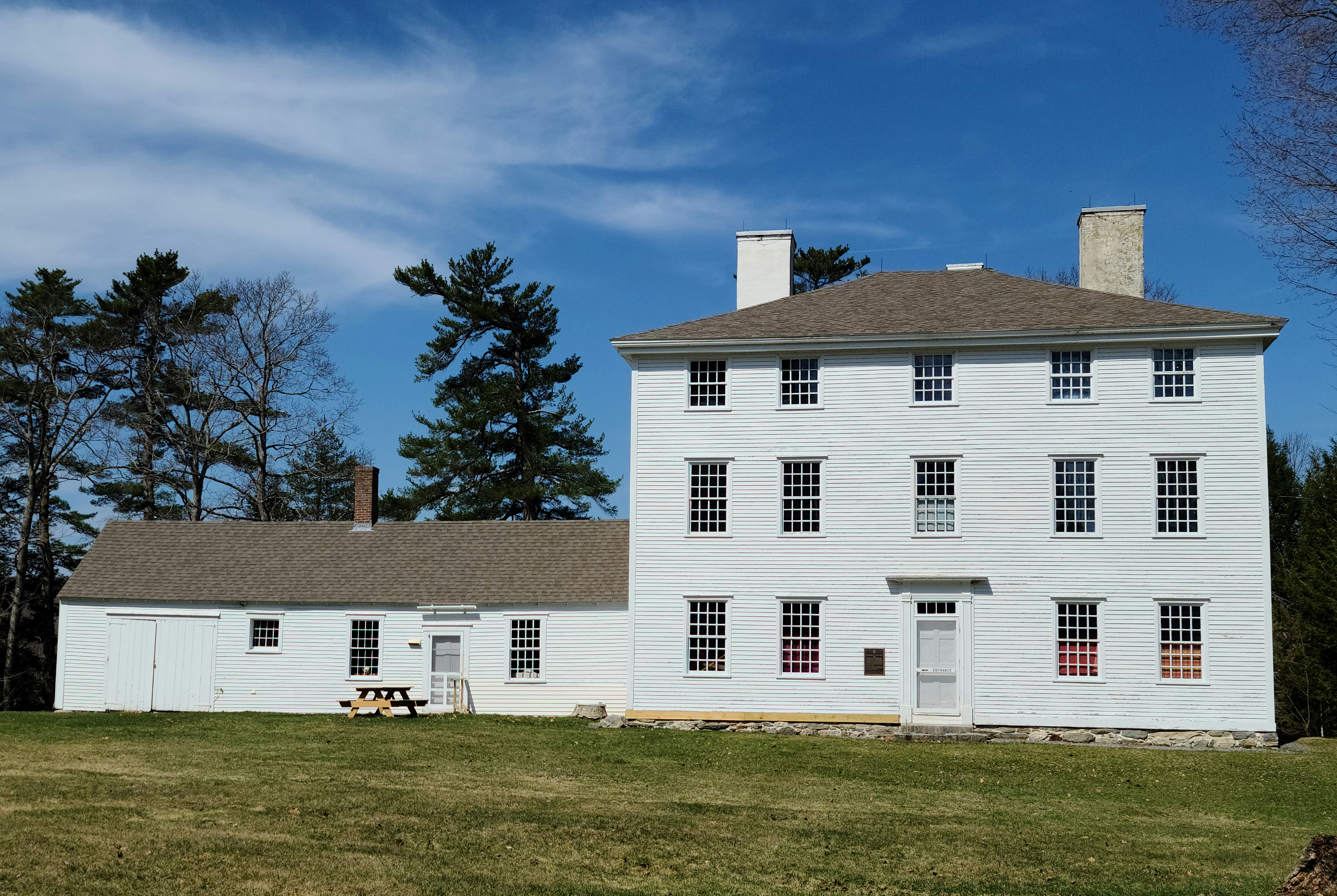
- The Courthouse in April 2023

- Location within Maine Location within the United States
- Location: 23 Courthouse Road, Dresden, Maine
- Coordinates: 44°6′19″N 69°45′59″W
- Area: 56 acres (23 ha)
- Built: 1761
- Architect: Flagg, Gersham
- NRHP reference No.: 70000052
- Added to NRHP: January 12, 1970

The Pownalborough Courthouse is a historic court house at 23 Courthouse Road in Dresden, Maine, USA. Built in the early 1760s, it was the first county courthouse for Lincoln County, which was established in 1760. It is the only surviving courthouse in the state of Maine that was built during the colonial period, and is now a museum owned and operated by the Lincoln County Historical Society. It was listed on the National Register of Historic Places in 1970.

== Description and history ==
The Pownalborough Courthouse stands in what is now a rural area of western Dresden, overlooking the Kennebec River just to the west. It stands on grounds that were at the time of its construction the site of Fort Shirley, one of the first inland forts built by the British on the river. The courthouse has a roughly square three-story main block, framed in wood, covered by a hip roof, and clad in wooden clapboards. The main facade is five bays wide, with a center entrance flanked by pilasters and topped by an entablature and cornice. A single-story wing extends to one side. The interior has seen a variety of alterations, but retains original wide flooring. It has never been fitted with electricity or modern plumbing.

Lincoln County was separated from York County, Massachusetts (Maine then being part of Massachusetts) in 1760. It was named for Governor Thomas Pownall, and the town of Pownalborough (encompassing modern Dresden, Alna, Jefferson, and Wiscasset) was named in his honor.

The proprietors who owned the land, the Kennebec Proprietors, voted to build a courthouse that year. The building would be located on the grounds of Fort Shirley, which had been built in 1752 as a defense against Native American attacks. The fort's importance had declined since the construction of Fort Western further upriver, and it was thought that its facilities could be used to house a jail and keeper's quarters.

Construction began on the courthouse in 1761, and the county's first court session was held in the unfinished building later that year. The building was not completed until 1769. In addition to housing the court facilities, the building also served as a tavern, an inn, a post office, a fencing hall, a dance hall, a church, and a meeting house, and had living quarters on the third floor. Those quarters were occupied by the fort commander, Major Samuel Goodwin, and were continuously occupied by his descendants into the 1930s. The local historical society purchased the 56-acre (23 ha) property from Goodwin's descendants in 1954.

== Notable history ==
Famous cases held at the Court House included a property case that was argued by John Adams, as a young lawyer fresh out of school, who would someday become the second United States president. Adams wrote in his journals that he hated the journey to the Pownalborough Court House because of the muddy and unkempt road and always spoke at length about his hatred of trees because they blocked his path numerous times during the trip. He also was one of the few people to visit the court by road rather than by the Kennebec River, which was considered the easier and safer way to travel. John Adams was offered a job with the Kennebec Proprietors to represent them in property cases, and he did so on the condition that he could work out of the Falmouth (now Portland, ME) Court House instead. This kicked off his career and eventually led him down his path of being a successful attorney.

In addition to Adams, the courthouse also was visited by Benedict Arnold during his famous expedition to Canada. When Arnold arrived, the court's caretaker Major Samuel Goodwin refused to give him maps of the region that he created himself. At the time, Major Goodwin was a loyalist, and Arnold was famously a patriot at the time. After a physical altercation with his son, a patriot, Major Goodwin traveled to Fort Western and turned over the maps to Arnold and his expedition. After the war, Major Goodwin wrote to George Washington demanding payment for the maps.

=== Rebecca Foster v. Judge North ===
The most controversial case to ever take place at the Pownalborough Court House was the trial of Judge North on the charge of ravishment. This case is most notable because it was the first time that a woman gave expert medical testimony in the court in 1787.

Martha Ballard was a midwife from Hallowell who was known for her low mortality rates, heroism, and devote religious beliefs. She was known for doing anything for her patients including crossing the Kennebec river to deliver babies in the dead of winter when no one else would. She was friends with the local Reverend Issac Foster and his wife Mrs. Rebecca Foster.

Judge North was not a fan of Reverend Foster's unorthodox preaching and ran a campaign to get him fired, eventually succeeding. In need of a new job, the Reverend left town to look for somewhere else to preach, leaving his wife behind at home. Mrs. Foster told Martha Ballard that in the course of one week, three men had broken into her house and raped her, including Judge North.

Martha Ballard begged Mrs. Foster not to say anything and not bring the case, but she insisted. When charges were brought, Judge North evaded arrest stating that it was embarrassing to be arrested by his own men. He was brought to trial first. The other 2 defendants claimed they were out of town during the event. The most damning evidence was that Mrs. Foster was pregnant and could not have conceived the baby with her husband because he was out of town. Judge North claimed that Mrs. Foster was not a liar nor was she a person of low morals and that she simply mis-identified him as one of the attackers.

When Martha Ballard was called to testify, she wrote in her diary that she was certain of Judge North's guilt and so were all of her acquaintances. When Judge North was found not guilty, it shocked the religious Martha Ballard to her core, so much so that she refused to attend public church services for 7 years after that. The charges against Judge North were changed from a rape charge to attempted ravishment, because rape was a capital offense. Further, at the time, cases where women were bringing claims, such as rape, were considered as tools for men to fight each other. Going into the trial, there would have been an assumption that the reverend told his wife to press charges as retaliation for getting fired.

== Present day museum ==
This historic courthouse is now open seasonally (Memorial Day to Columbus Day) as a museum dedicated to local history; admission is charged.

In addition to the museum, the Pownalborough Court House lands have a vast trail system including an ADA standard trail and ADA standard public bathroom.

== See also ==
- National Register of Historic Places listings in Lincoln County, Maine
