= Cushnoc Archeological Site =

- Cushnoc (Cushnoc Archeological Site)
- U.S. National Register of Historic Places
- U.S. National Historic Landmark
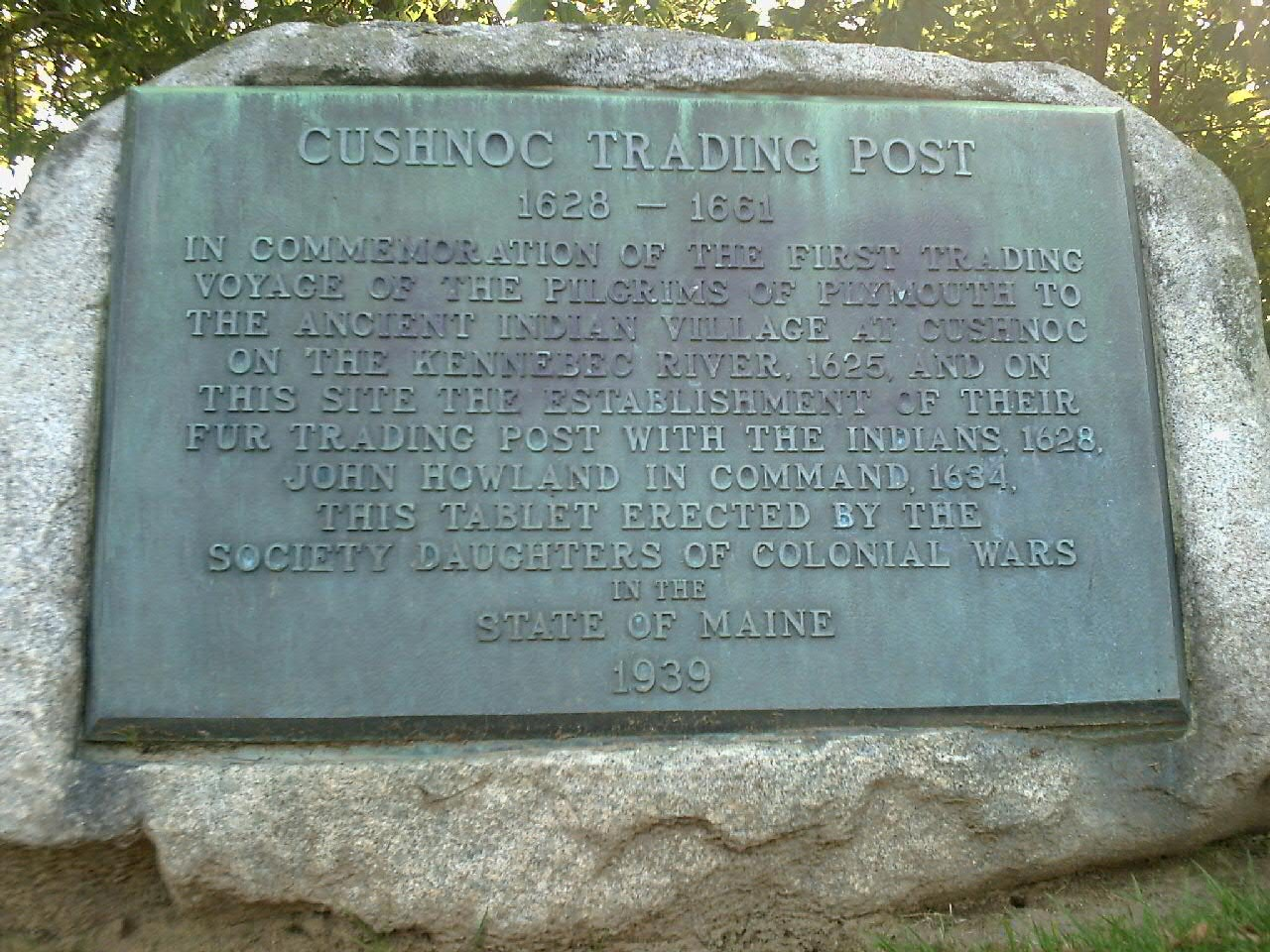

- Location within Maine Location within the United States
- Nearest city: Augusta, Maine
- Coordinates: 44°18′54″N 69°46′15.6″W
- Built: 1628
- NRHP reference No.: 89001703

Significant dates
- Added to NRHP: October 27, 1989
- Designated NHL: April 12, 1993

The Cushnoc Archeological Site, also known as Cushnoc (ME 021.02) or Koussinoc or Coussinoc, is an archaeological site in Augusta, Maine that was the location of a 17th-century trading post operated by English colonists from Plymouth Colony in present-day Massachusetts. The trading post was built in 1628 and lies on the Kennebec River. The English primarily traded with bands of the Abenaki nation.

Later the British colonists developed Fort Western, an 18th-century stockade fort, adjacent to this site. It became the center of development for the city of Augusta. The Cushnoc site is significant as it provides a window into trading, living, and construction practices in the early period of colonial settlement in New England. It was declared a National Historic Landmark in 1993.

== Description and history ==
The English Plymouth Colony was established at present-day Plymouth, Massachusetts in 1620 by religious dissidents and English adventurers. In order to repay the investors in the colonization effort, the colonists engaged in a number of ventures, one of which was trading for furs with the local Native American population. Pursuant to this business, the colonists in 1628 established a trading post on the Kennebec River at the site of what is now Augusta, Maine, which the Plymouth colonists called "Cushnoc". The Plymouth colonists were not the only colonists trading on that river, and the Plymouth colonists are known to have operated at at least one other site in the area. They are known to have abandoned their trading on the Kennebec in 1661.

In 1754 the British built Fort Western (now also designated as a National Historic Landmark) "at a place called Cushenoc[sic] Near The Spot where one hundred years ago the late Plymouth Colony had a Garrison."

Between 1984 and 1987, the Cushnoc site was identified and excavated. It is located on the eastern bank of the Kennebec River, just south of Fort Western, on land that is partly owned by a local church. The excavation outlined the boundaries of the trading post's palisaded wall, as well as postholes of earthfast buildings erected at the site. These and other finds at the site were found beneath the surface level plow zone in sandy soil. Artifacts found were consistent with those found at other sites dating to the mid-17th century, including tobacco pipes, glass beads, utilitarian ceramics, French and Spanish earthenwares, and many hand-forged nails. The data uncovered thus far and new excavations are expected to shed light on the relationships between (and among) the English traders, the Native populations, and the nearby French Acadian settlements.

The site was listed on the National Register of Historic Places in 1989, and was designated as a National Historic Landmark in 1993.

== See also ==
- List of National Historic Landmarks in Maine
- National Register of Historic Places listings in Kennebec County, Maine
