= Dresden, Maine =

Town in Maine, United States

- Town
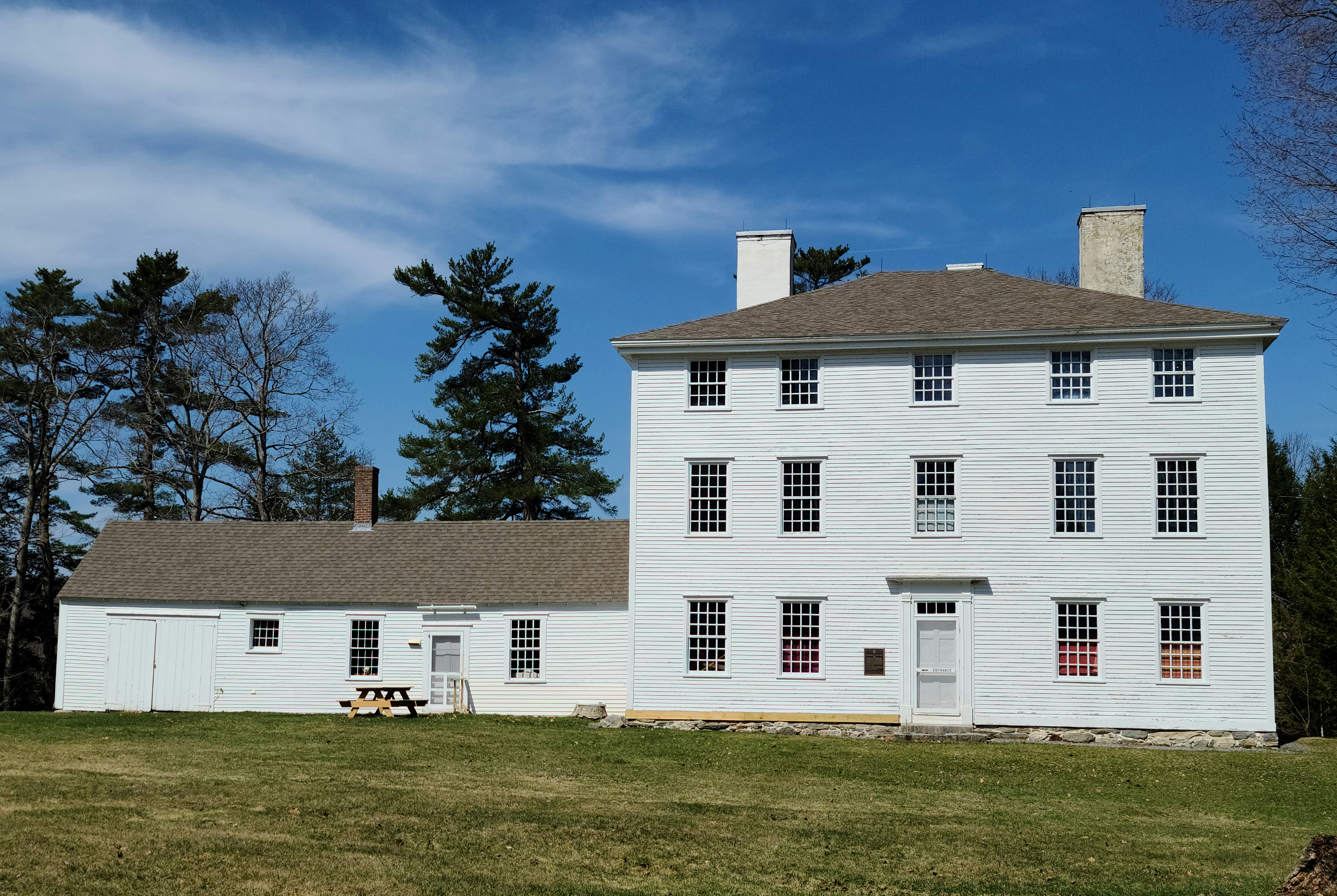
- Pownalborough Courthouse

- Seal

- Location in Lincoln County and the state of Maine.
- Coordinates: 44°04′46″N 69°45′08″W
- Country: United States
- State: Maine
- County: Lincoln
- Incorporated: June 25, 1794

Area
  - Total: 33.21 sq mi (86.01 km^{2})
  - Land: 30.45 sq mi (78.87 km^{2})
  - Water: 2.76 sq mi (7.15 km^{2})
- Elevation: 190 ft (58 m)

Population (2020)
  - Total: 1,725
  - Density: 57/sq mi (21.9/km^{2})
- Time zone: UTC-5 (Eastern (EST))
  - Summer (DST): UTC-4 (EDT)
- ZIP code: 04342
- Area code: 207
- FIPS code: 23-18475
- GNIS feature ID: 582446
- Website: dresdenme.org

Dresden is a town in Lincoln County, Maine, United States, that was incorporated in 1794. The population was 1,725 at the 2020 census.

== History ==
The town was originally settled in 1752 under the name Frankfort by French and German Huguenots, who were part of the first wave of French-speaking immigrants to arrive in Maine, but were distinguished from later arrivals by their Protestant faith. William Shirley built Fort Shirley in the community at the same time Fort Halifax (Maine) was built. The town was incorporated as Pownalborough in 1760, when Lincoln County was created in the Maine District of Massachusetts. Pownalborough included the Town of Wiscasset, which was soon set off on its own as the shire town of the county. When the present territory was incorporated in 1794, Lincoln County Probate Judge Jonathan Bowman chose Dresden as the new name of the town because he liked the sound of it.

Dresden is located on the eastern side of the Kennebec River. Historic sites include an old, brick school building and the Pownalborough Courthouse, which is now used as a museum and is open to the public. The Pownalborough Courthouse was built in 1760 and was the first seat of government east of the Kennebec River. The families who settled Dresden and those who were soon afterward sent there by the government of Massachusetts played a crucial role in the battle for American independence in Maine. Robert Treat Paine, John Hancock, and John Adams appeared at the Court House in the Revolutionary Era. Well known local families included the Goodwins, Houdlettes, Mayerses, Bridges, Bowmans, Percys, Johnsons, and Trussells, who variously left their marks on the history of the town, the state, and the country.

== Geography ==
According to the United States Census Bureau, the town has a total area of 33.21 square miles (86.01 km^{2}), of which 30.45 square miles (78.87 km^{2}) is land and 2.76 square miles (7.15 km^{2}) is water. Dresden is drained by the Kennebec River and the Eastern River, which merges into the former at the southern tip of Green Point and the southeastern side of Swan Island. The Eastern River has long been a favored spot to fish for smelt in shacks centered above holes made in the winter ice.

Dresden's other notable geographical features are Blinn Hill and The Great Bog. At 440 feet (134 m) above sea level, Blinn Hill affords a view of the White Mountains, more than 100 miles (160 km) away. The Great Bog is primeval and lies not far from the natural foot of Blinn Hill.

== Demographics ==
Historical population
Census	Pop.	Note	%±
1800	700		—
1810	1,096		56.6%
1820	1,338		22.1%
1830	1,559		16.5%
1840	1,647		5.6%
1850	1,419		−13.8%
1860	1,247		−12.1%
1870	990		−20.6%
1880	1,032		4.2%
1890	1,043		1.1%
1900	882		−15.4%
1910	815		−7.6%
1920	620		−23.9%
1930	629		1.5%
1940	631		0.3%
1950	729		15.5%
1960	766		5.1%
1970	787		2.7%
1980	998		26.8%
1990	1,332		33.5%
2000	1,625		22.0%
2010	1,672		2.9%
2020	1,725		3.2%
U.S. Decennial Census

=== 2010 census ===
As of the census of 2010, there were 1,672 people, 700 households, and 482 families residing in the town. The population density was 54.9 inhabitants per square mile (21.2/km^{2}). There were 819 housing units at an average density of 26.9 per square mile (10.4/km^{2}). The racial makeup of the town was 98.6% White, 0.2% African American, 0.1% Native American, 0.3% Asian, 0.2% from other races, and 0.7% from two or more races. Hispanic or Latino of any race were 1.3% of the population.

There were 700 households, of which 29.0% had children under the age of 18 living with them, 55.9% were married couples living together, 7.4% had a female householder with no husband present, 5.6% had a male householder with no wife present, and 31.1% were non-families. 23.7% of all households were made up of individuals, and 9% had someone living alone who was 65 years of age or older. The average household size was 2.39 and the average family size was 2.78.

The median age in the town was 45 years. 20.5% of residents were under the age of 18; 6.8% were between the ages of 18 and 24; 22.6% were from 25 to 44; 36.3% were from 45 to 64; and 13.7% were 65 years of age or older. The gender makeup of the town was 51.3% male and 48.7% female.

=== 2000 census ===
As of the census of 2000, there were 1,625 people, 642 households, and 455 families residing in the town. The population density was 53.0 inhabitants per square mile (20.5/km^{2}). There were 739 housing units at an average density of 24.1 per square mile (9.3/km^{2}). The racial makeup of the town was 97.42% White, 0.25% African American, 0.25% Native American, 0.49% Asian, and 1.60% from two or more races. Hispanic or Latino of any race were 0.12% of the population.

There were 642 households, out of which 34.1% had children under the age of 18 living with them, 57.0% were married couples living together, 7.6% had a female householder with no husband present, and 29.1% were non-families. 20.2% of all households were made up of individuals, and 8.6% had someone living alone who was 65 years of age or older. The average household size was 2.53 and the average family size was 2.92.

In the town, the population was spread out, with 25.9% under the age of 18, 5.5% from 18 to 24, 32.3% from 25 to 44, 24.5% from 45 to 64, and 11.8% who were 65 years of age or older. The median age was 37 years. For every 100 females, there were 104.1 males. For every 100 females age 18 and over, there were 101.0 males.

The median income for a household in the town was $41,719, and the median income for a family was $44,762. Males had a median income of $31,488 versus $20,750 for females. The per capita income for the town was $18,886. About 9.5% of families and 12.5% of the population were below the poverty line, including 19.5% of those under age 18 and 10.3% of those age 65 or over.

== Site of interest ==
- Brick Schoolhouse Museum, Dresden Historical Society

== Education ==
Dresden is part of the Kennebec Intra-District Schools Regional School Unit 2.

For the 2011 to 2012 school year, there were approximately 104 students in Dresden Elementary School.

== Notable people ==
- David Kidder, US congressman
- Jeffrey Pierce, state legislator
- M. B. M. Toland, poet, social leader
- Lewis Turco, poet, teacher and writer
