= Reuben Colburn =

American shipbuilder

Reuben Colburn (1740 – 1818) was a shipbuilder from Pittston, Maine, who made great contributions to the American side in the Revolutionary War. His home, the Major Reuben Colburn House, is listed in the National Register of Historic Places.

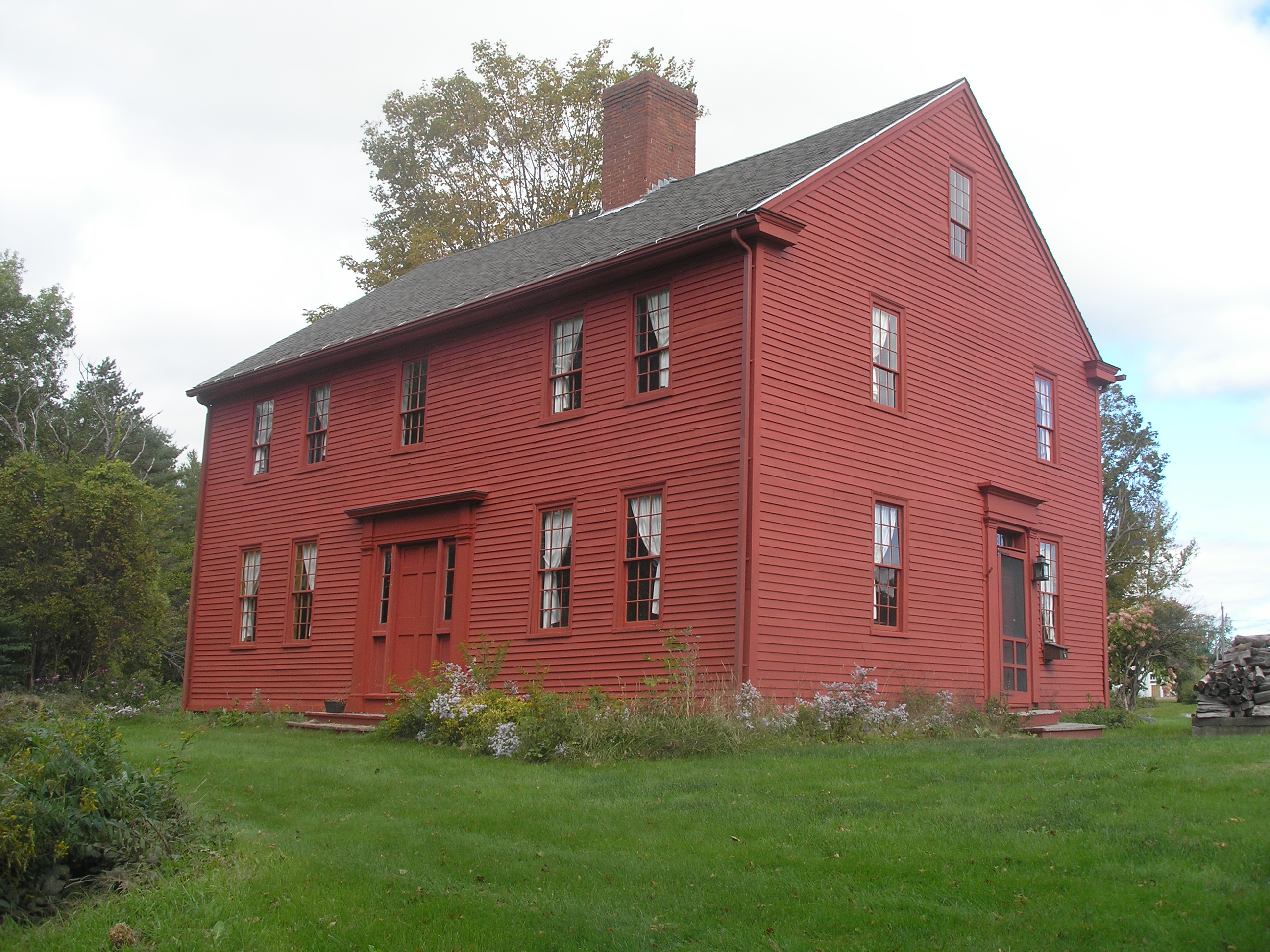
Major Reuben Colburn House

== Biography ==
In 1761, Reuben Colburn, his parents, and his seven siblings moved to Pittston in Maine, then part of Gardinerston and the province of Massachusetts. He arrived near the beginning of serious tensions between the colonists and the British.

A strong patriot, Colburn, a lumberman and shipbuilder, took up arms in 1775 when the revolution started, obtaining command of his local committee of safety. To bring local Indians in on the American side, he gathered the Abenaki tribes of the St. Francis. Traveling by canoe Colburn led them to Cambridge, Massachusetts for an audience with General George Washington at his temporary headquarters. A surprised Washington welcomed them with open arms and enlisted the chiefs on the spot.

When informed of a plan to capture Quebec City under the command of American Colonel Benedict Arnold, Colburn offered his services to the Continental Army, complete with scouts, maps, and boats. Arnold was enthusiastic about the new support and wrote Colburn immediately:

Sir, His Excellency General Washington Desires you will Inform your self how soon, there can be procured, or built, at Kennebec, Two hundred light Bateaux Capable of Carrying Six or Seven Men each, with their Provisions & Baggage, (say 100 wt. to each man) the Boats to be furnished with four Oars two Paddles & two Setting Poles each, the expense of Building them & whether a sufficient quantity of Nails can be procured with you.

Colburn sped to Maine, making plans for the expedition. Once home, he put his crew to work building the bateaux and procuring the foodstuffs from the local citizenry, many of them Tories unsympathetic to the patriot cause. He ordered maps and sent three scouts to explore the upper Dead River ahead of the coming army. Colburn made three trips to Cambridge during August of that year while the crews, under the supervision of his brothers, Oliver and Benjamin Colburn, and partner Thomas Agry, labored to fill the contract. They had only fifteen days to complete the task. Due to the short time frame and time of year, no dried pine was available and he was forced to cut fresh green pine to attach to the oak ribs.

When the transports arrived on September 20, 1775, the bateaux were just about finished. With Arnold on the transport Broad Bay was a 19-year-old volunteer soldier by the name of Aaron Burr. Both were entertained in the Colburn home for three days until the army moved on upriver to Fort Western. Many legends surround the activities of Burr, but his stay with Reuben and Elizabeth Colburn is well documented. Two divisions remained at Colburn House for a week.

Colburn followed the expedition with a company of carpenters, fixing the flotilla as needed. The army barely made it through to supplies in Canada, and the 600 remaining men led by Arnold later mounted an unsuccessful attack on Quebec. Most of the commanders were captured and Arnold received the leg wound that plagued him for the rest of his days. Colburn and his brothers returned to Pittston, where he continued to build ships and support the American cause for the remainder of the war.

He served in the Massachusetts General Court and was a delegate to the Falmouth Convention, where he was the first to vote for statehood for Maine. That effort failed.

Colburn was never paid in full the money promised him by Washington. Thus, in the winter of 1776, when he first contacted Washington about the matter, a campaign began to gain payment that would last until the last family member failed in 1856.

- September 1775 Colburn received a cash payment of £332 10s 6d receipted September 12, 1775 with a credit to the United States of £159 10s 6d . Colburn's receipts in the George Washington papers at the Library of Congress show he received £26 total money;
- September 1775 to February 20, 1782 Colburn could not obtain a settlement from Benedict Arnold.
- March 17, 1785 Commissioners appointed to go to each state and settled with individuals; all claims were lodged with such commissioners within one year from that date; every claim not so lodged was precluded from settlement, except at the Board of Treasury. If the claim was lodged in time with the proper official and not settled, it ought to have been attended to and lodged with Mr Milligan, Comptroller of the Treasury before July 23, 1788 if it was an unliquidated claim; if liquidated, an abstract of it might have been lodged before May 1, 1794 and limitations avoided.;
- 1787 Colburn applied to Mr Imlay commissioner for Massachusetts and lodged his vouchers.
- July 23, 1787 an abstract of claims was directed to be lodged with the Treasury within a year or being barred forever; Colburn called upon Imlay some months after lodging his papers and was told that the papers had been sent to New York with either the War or the State Department[s]
- In 1792, an act of limitation passed in the Continental Congress banning all Revolutionary claims as questionable due to the length of time passed, but this was challenged as unjust.
- January 1795 the papers are found with Royal Flints hands in New York after many fruitless searches for them;
- His Claim presented February 2, 1795
- January 15, 1796 Before the Committee of Claims Cloburn applied for settlement for making 200 batteaux [For which he had Benedict Arnold receipt]; for twenty More batteaux and some other services; as note before his papers and vouchers had been in the hands of Royal Flint until after his claim was barred by the statute of limitation act.
- Colburn suffered great economic hardship for this great expense; he was financially ruined by the Embargo Act of 1807 and the War of 1812 and died in 1818,.
- In 1819 the Congressional Committee on Pensions and Revolutionary claims reported that Colburn had pressed a claim on the United States for the sum of £523 15s 10d with a credit to the United States of £159 10s 6d leaving a Balance of £364 5s 4d; along with the account was a certificate of Henry Dearborn of December 9, 1818 testing that in 1775 that the expedition was furnished with 200 bateaux with oars, paddles and setting poles; that the prices charged were reasonable; that Colburn proceeded in the expedition to the head of the Kennebeck river with a party of men under his direction; that he had several white men and Indians as guides and spies; and to furnish them with provisions. The Committee ruled that there was sufficient time until 1794 for the claim to have been settled until barred by the statute of limitations; and that to admit a claim after 40 years after being barred was inexpedient and that claim should not be granted.

Kenneth Roberts' 1929 novel Arundel mentions Reuben Colburn on several pages. The journals of the members of the original expedition compiled by Roberts in March to Quebec are a critical primary source for the ill-fated Arnold Expedition.

A new biography of Reuben Colburn: "Patriot on the Kennebec: Major Reuben Colburn, Benedict Arnold and the March to Quebec 1775" by Colburn descendant Mark A. York, was published by The History Press of Charleston, South Carolina, in February 2012.
