= Albert G. Jewett =

American lawyer and diplomat (1802–1885)

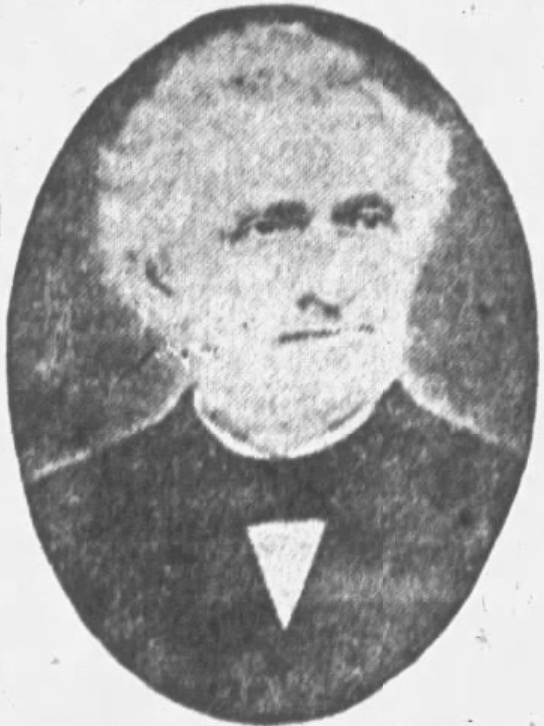

Chargé d'affaires to Peru
- In office March 13, 1845 – July 21, 1847
- Appointed by: James K. Polk
- Preceded by: John A. Bryan
- Succeeded by: John Randolph Clay

Personal details
- Born: Albert Gallatin Jewett; November 27, 1802 Pittston, Maine, US
- Died: April 4, 1885 (aged 82)
- Relations: Daniel T. Jewett (brother)
- Education: Colby College

Albert Gallatin Jewett (November 27, 1802 – April 4, 1885) was an American lawyer and diplomat. He served as Chargé d'affaires to Peru from 1845 to 1847.

== Biography ==
Jewett was born on November 27, 1802, in Pittston, Maine, and is believed to have been named for politician Albert Gallatin. His brother was politician Daniel T. Jewett. He graduated from Colby College in 1826. He read law under Joseph Williamson, and after being admitted to the bar in March 1829, he practiced law in Bangor from then until 1845, and between 1832 and 1838, was Penobscot County's attorney.

On March 13, 1845, Jewett was appointed Chargé d'affaires to Peru by James K. Polk. The Peruvian government requested that his position be recalled on June 2, 1846, and he left office on July 21, 1847. In February 1847, the Peruvian government paid him $30,000 to cover American ships they damaged. He was nicknamed "War Horse Jewett" and an obituary called him "the most noted man in [Maine]" while he was diplomat. He was a staunch Unionist during the American Civil War. During an 1861 state political convention, he withdrew from the meeting after compromises were decided upon. During an 1861 speech, during which he took a Union flag and stated that he would die for the Union.

After serving as a diplomat, Jewett was mayor of Belfast, Maine in 1863, 1864, and 1867. He was married to Hannah Wilson, the daughter of politician John Wilson and sister of Sarah Wilson, who married his brother Daniel. He died on April 4, 1885, aged 82, in Belfast.

Diplomatic posts
Preceded by John A. Bryan	United States Charge d'Affaires to Peru; March 13, 1845 – July 21, 1847	Succeeded by John Randolph Clay
