= Major Reuben Colburn House =

Historic house in Maine, United States

- Colburn House State Historic Site
- U.S. National Register of Historic Places
- U.S. Historic district – Contributing property
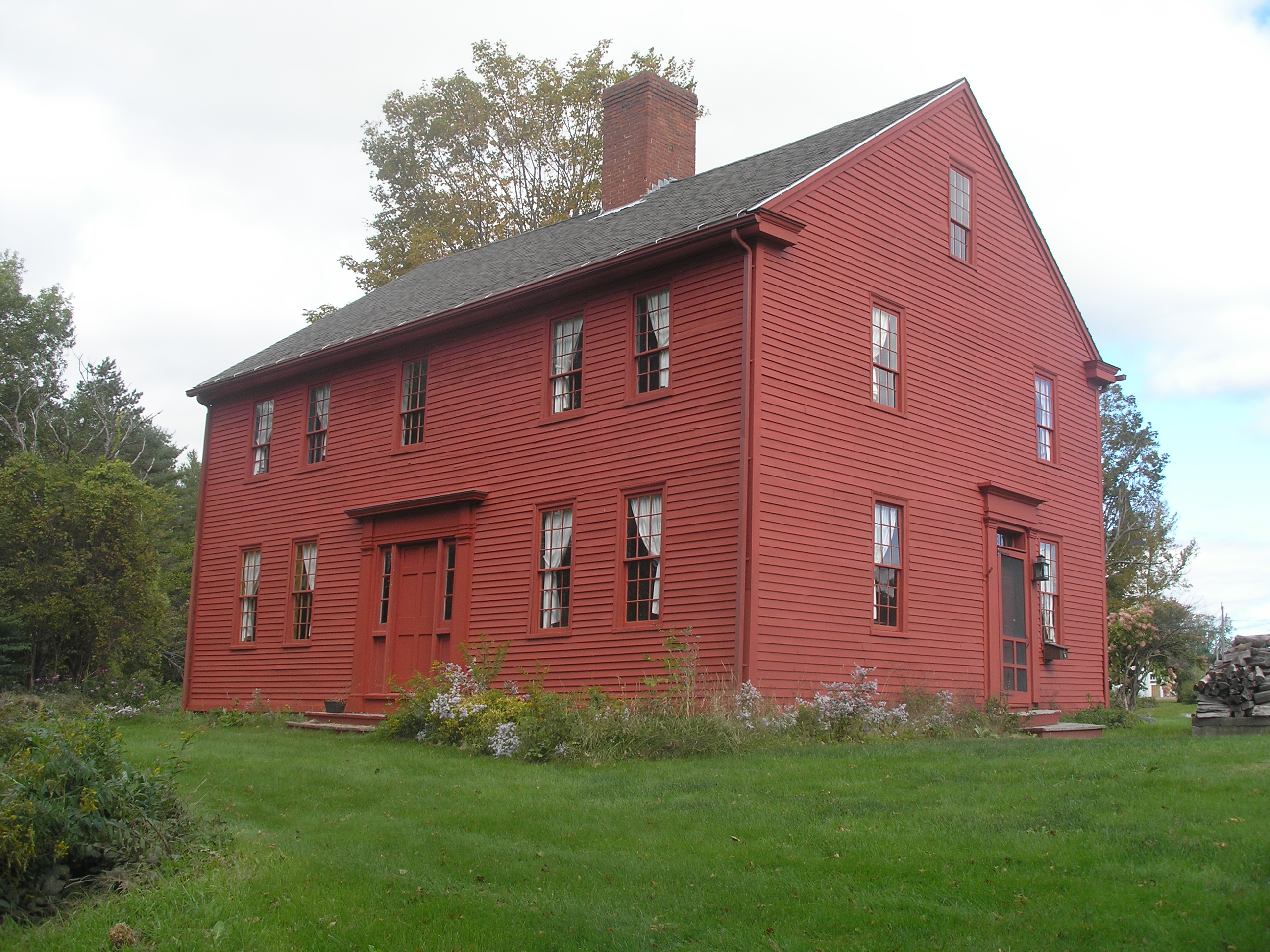

- Location within Maine
- Interactive map of Colburn House State Historic Site
- Location: 33 Arnold Road, Pittston, Maine
- Coordinates: 44°11′52″N 69°45′16″W
- Area: 6 acres (2.4 ha)
- Built: 1765
- Architect: Reuben Colburn
- Architectural style: Federal, Georgian
- Part of: Arnold Trail to Quebec (ID69000018)
- NRHP reference No.: 04000741

Significant dates
- Added to NRHP: July 28, 2004
- Designated CP: October 1, 1969

The Major Reuben Colburn House is a historic house museum and state historic site on Arnold Road in Pittston, Maine. Built in 1765, it was the home of Reuben Colburn, a patriot and shipbuilder, from 1765 to 1818. The house, one of the first to be built in the area, is most notable as one of the staging area's for Benedict Arnold's 1775 Quebec expedition. It is operated by the state as the Colburn House State Historic Site, and was listed on the National Register of Historic Places in 2004.

== Description ==
The Colburn House stands on a rise overlooking the Kennebec River to the west. It is set south of the First Congregational Church of Pittston, on the west side of Arnold Road, an old alignment of Maine State Route 27, which runs just to the east. The house is a 2 1/2-story timber-frame structure, with a side gable roof, central brick chimney, and clapboard siding. The front facade is five bays wide, with slightly irregular spacing of windows, and a comparatively elaborate front door surround consisting of flanking sidelight windows and pilasters supporting a corniced entablature.

== History ==
Reuben Colburn and his family settled in Gardinerston (then part of Massachusetts) in 1761. In 1763, he was granted 250 acres (100 ha) of land and built a saw mill, brick yard, boat yard, and grist mill on the shores of the Kennebec River. In 1765, he built his two-story home on "an eminence which gradually slopes down to the shore." Colburn was later described as "one of our earliest 'kings of industry.'"

Colburn assisted George Washington and Benedict Arnold in the planning and provisioning of Arnold's 1775 military expedition through the northern wilderness of Maine to Quebec City. This site was one of the last outposts of support and supply for the expedition. The house passed out of the Colburn family in 1953, after which it underwent some restorative work under private ownership. It was acquired by the state in 1971, and has been operated as a historic site since.
