= March to Quebec =

Book by Kenneth Roberts

March To Quebec (published 1938, revised 1940) is a historical work by novelist Kenneth Roberts largely compiled from the actual journals of Colonel Benedict Arnold and several of his companions during the American Revolution. It depicts their march through the Maine wilderness in 1775 for a surprise attack upon Quebec City with the hope of adding it as a fourteenth colony. Other famous Americans included in this unsuccessful campaign: Christopher Greene, Daniel Morgan, Henry Dearborn and Aaron Burr. Drama was added by the author to flesh out the story.

Shortly, after its publication a review in the Boston Evening Transcript read:

Bringing together, in March to Quebec, the journals of the Quebec Expedition is an exceedingly valuable contribution to the Americana of the Revolution ... Many have been practically inaccessible ... Only a few libraries in the country have them all, and he who would buy them for himself would be obliged to spend a large sum of money and wait a year or so before some dealer in rare books could accumulate all of them.

Roberts incorporated some of these historical notes in his other books, such as Arundel.

== See also ==
- Benedict Arnold's expedition to Quebec
- Kenneth Roberts (author)
