= Fort Western =

- U.S. National Register of Historic Places
- U.S. National Historic Landmark
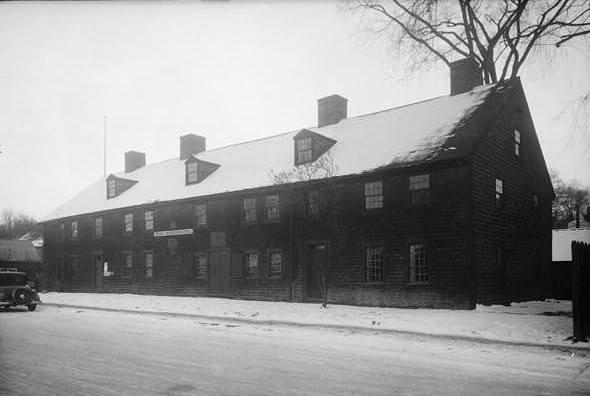
- Fort Western in 1936

- Location within Maine Location within the United States
- Location: Bowman Street, Augusta, Maine
- Coordinates: 44°18′59″N 69°46′16″W
- Area: less than one acre
- Built: 1754
- Architect: Gershom Flagg
- NRHP reference No.: 69000009

Significant dates
- Added to NRHP: December 2, 1969
- Designated NHL: November 7, 1973

Fort Western is a former British colonial outpost at the head of navigation on the Kennebec River at modern Augusta, Maine, United States. It was built in 1754 during the French and Indian War, and is now a National Historic Landmark and local historic site owned by the city. It is the oldest surviving wooden fort in America, which still stands today. Its main building, the only original element of the fort to survive, was restored in 1920 by William H Gannett and Guy P Gannett and now depicts its original use as a trading post. The Gannett's then gifted the building back to the City of Augusta, and it opened as a museum on July 4th, 1922.

== French and Indian War ==
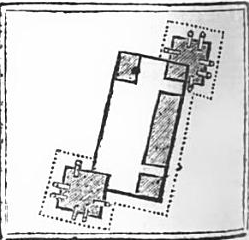
Fort Western, Maine

Fort Western was built by a Boston land company (the Kennebec Proprietors) in 1754 as a fortified trading post, and to promote settlement in the area and help Britain gain power in North America. The fort was a log palisade with blockhouses which protected a store and warehouse. It was never directly attacked. From a high elevation a large rectangular enclosure commanded the river for more than a mile. Blockhouses 24 feet square and watch-boxes 12 feet square guarded opposite corners, and within stood a two-story main house 100 by 32 feet (30.5 m × 9.8 m). After the war ended, James Howard, its only commander, purchased the fort and operated the trading post.

== American Revolution ==
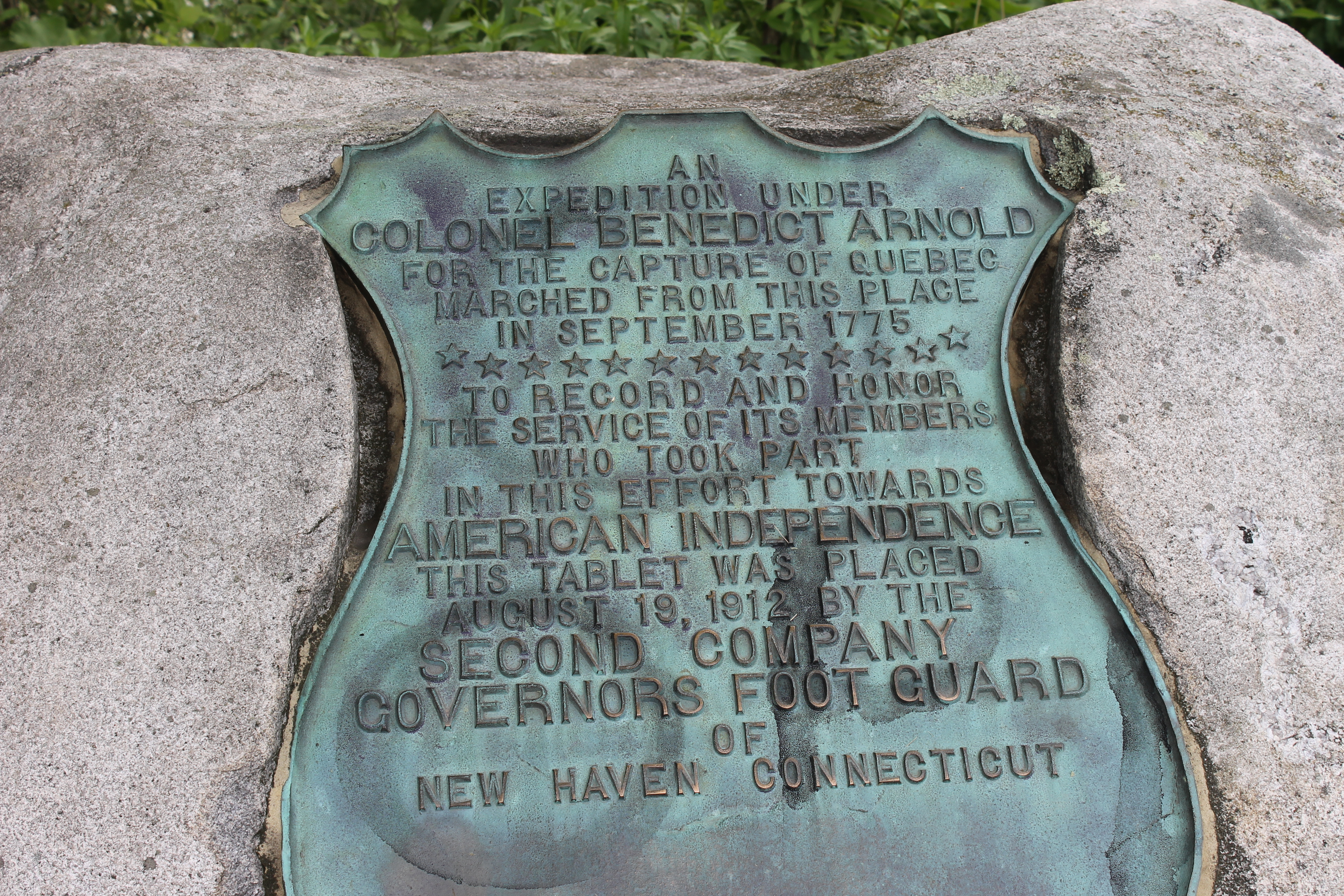
Historical marker noting that Benedict Arnold left Fort Western in 1775 for Quebec.

After 1769, Fort Western fell into decay. In 1775, Benedict Arnold's expedition to Quebec stopped at Fort Western long enough to repair bateaux. Arnold, Daniel Morgan, Roger Enos, and Aaron Burr stayed as guests in the garrison while their force camped outside. Fort Western played a crucial role for Arnold's troops, allowing them to gather supplies, rest, and repair their bateaux, the flat bottom boats used on the Kennebec River. The supplies they gathered did not last long, and after two weeks, they were on half rations. Fort Western was the starting point for the march through the wilderness to Quebec.

== Old Fort Western ==
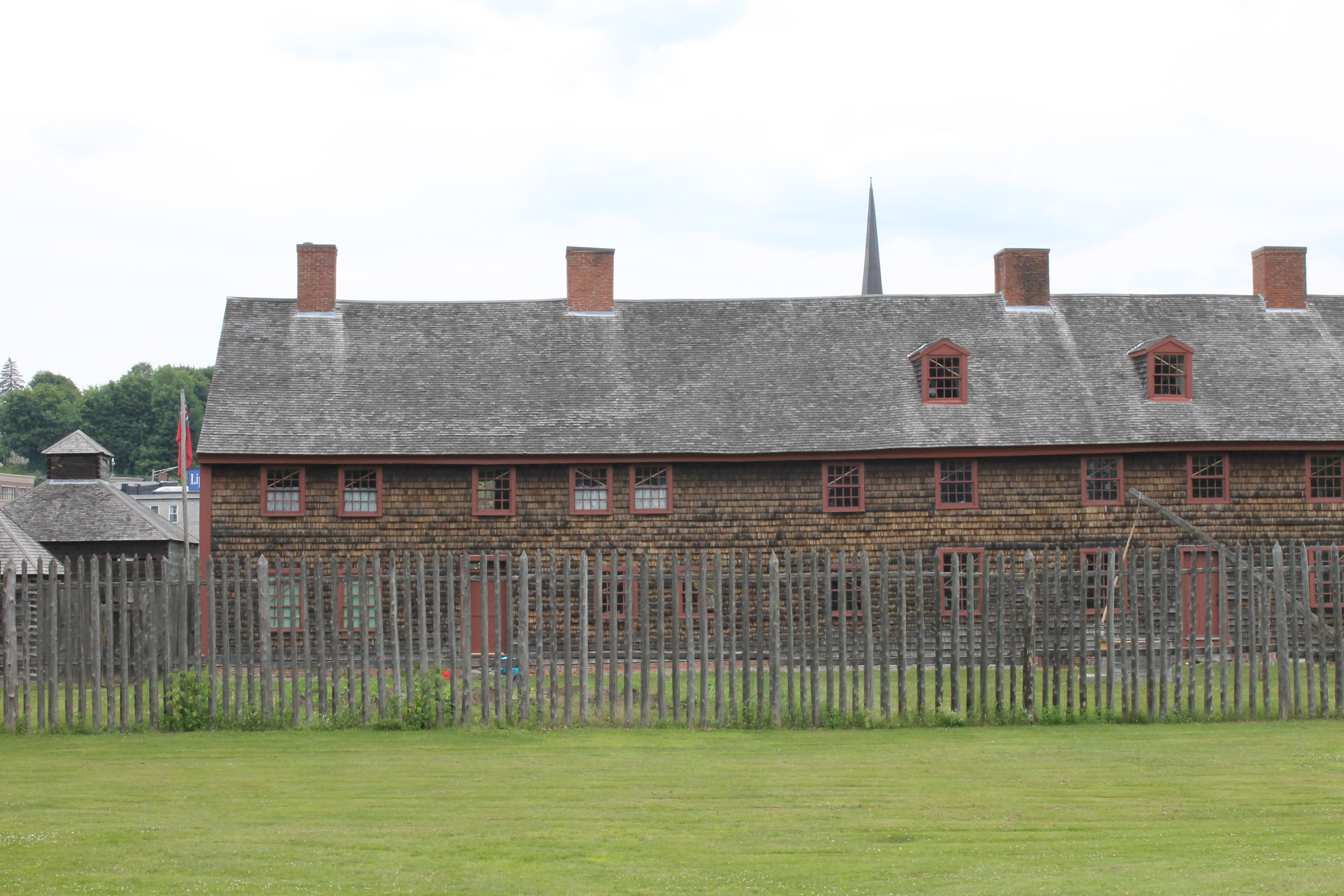
Fort Western in Augusta, Maine

The main building of the fort eventually passed out of the Howard family, and was converted into a tenement house. It was repurchased by Howard family descendants in 1919, and restored the following year, which included the construction of two new blockhouses and a stockade. The stockade was again rebuilt in 1960. Today its main building is a little-altered example of an 18th-century trading post. The fort and store are maintained as a museum and are open to the public during the summer months. It is currently America's oldest wooden Garrison from the French and Indian War Era.

The fort was listed on the National Register of Historic Places in 1969, and was declared a National Historic Landmark in 1973. Today, it is open to the public from Memorial Day weekend until Columbus day. The museum offers guided tours, 4th of July celebrations, and various educational programs for all to enjoy. These lessons and tours are guided by people in clothing from that time period, giving a glimpse of what life was like during 18th century colonial times.

== See also ==
- Cushnoc Archeological Site, adjacent to the fort
- List of National Historic Landmarks in Maine
- National Register of Historic Places listings in Kennebec County, Maine
