= Roger Enos =

American politician

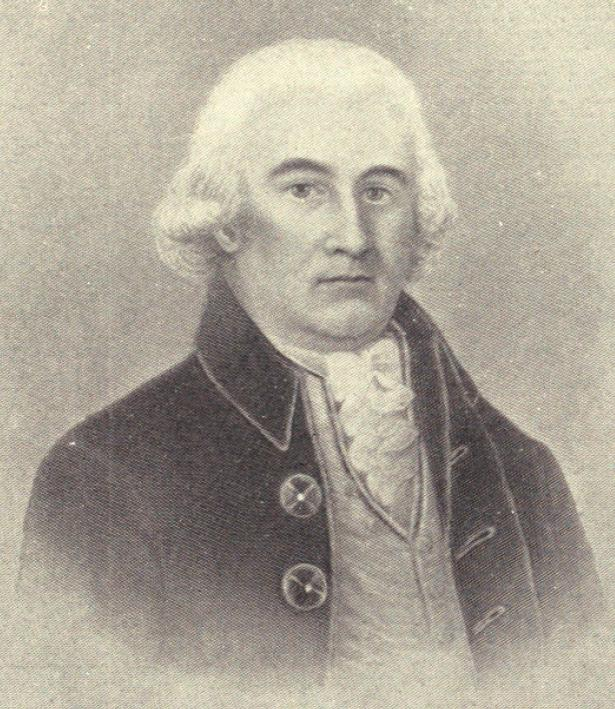
- Roger Enos. 1903 illustration based on portrait owned by great-grandson Franklin Hatch.
- Born: 1729; Simsbury, Connecticut
- Died: October 6, 1808 (Age 78 or 79); Colchester, Vermont
- Burial place: Greenmount Cemetery, Burlington, Vermont
- Military career
- Allegiance: Colony of Connecticut; Vermont Republic; United States of America
- Branch: Connecticut Militia; Continental Army; Vermont Militia
- Service years: 1759–92
- Rank: Major General
- Commands: Vermont Militia; 1st Division, Vermont Militia; 4th Division, Vermont Militia; Enos's Regiment of Connecticut Troops
- Conflicts: French and Indian War; Seven Years' War; American Revolution
- Other work: Farmer; Land speculator

Signature
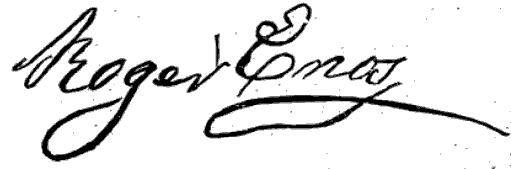

Roger Enos (1729 – October 6, 1808) was a colonial Vermont political and military leader during the American Revolution. In 1775, he took part in Benedict Arnold's expedition to Quebec, and he later commanded the Vermont Militia as a major general.

== Early life ==
Roger Enos, Sr. was born in Simsbury, Connecticut in 1729, the son of David and Mary (Gillet) Eno. David Eno participated in King George's War, and died in the 1745 Cape Breton campaign. Roger Enos was raised in Simsbury and Windsor, and became a farmer. In 1759 Enos joined the militia for the French and Indian War. He rose to sergeant major, was commissioned as an ensign, and soon advanced to regimental adjutant.

In 1762 he took part in the British expedition against Cuba during the Seven Years' War. In 1764 Enos was promoted to captain in the regiment commanded by Israel Putnam.

In 1773 he served on a commission that included Israel Putnam, Rufus Putnam and Phineas Lyman. The commission surveyed lands along the Mississippi River to identify sites for the grants promised to French and Indian War veterans, and their work led to Lyman's founding of the city that is now Natchez, Mississippi.

== American Revolution ==
At the start of the American Revolution, Enos was a major in the 2nd Regiment of Connecticut Militia. He joined the Continental Army and was commissioned lieutenant colonel of Connecticut's 22nd Regiment. In the summer of 1775 he took part in the Battle of Bunker Hill and other activities around Boston, and then joined Benedict Arnold's expedition to Quebec as commander of the rear guard. In October 1775 Enos and the soldiers under his command left the struggling expedition because of a shortage of food and supplies.

After marching his troops through the Maine wilderness and home to Connecticut, Enos was called a traitor and a coward, and court-martialed for "quitting without leave." He defended his decision to leave Arnold's expedition because of poor early winter weather, the lack of boats for transporting soldiers and supplies by river to Quebec, and the shortage of food that had reduced men to near starvation. He was acquitted and returned to service as lieutenant colonel of the 16th Connecticut Regiment.

John Sullivan, the president of the court-martial, later made public a written statement in support of Enos' conduct, and a number of other officers also issued a public circular supportive of his actions, including William Heath, John Stark, Joseph Reed, and James Reed.

In an oration commemorating Richard Montgomery, which was later published, the Reverend William Smith made comments about Enos' actions in Maine which Enos found objectionable, and he subsequently argued against Smith's speech in letters to the editor.

Enos subsequently commanded the 1st Connecticut State Regiment in 1777, and Enos' Regiment of Connecticut Troops, a militia unit that served in the Hudson Valley during 1778.

== Move to Vermont ==
Enos resigned from the Connecticut Militia in 1780 and moved to Windsor County, Vermont, settling on a farm in Hertford, the town that later became Hartland. He was almost immediately appointed colonel in command of a regiment of the Vermont Militia.

In 1781 he was appointed brigadier general and commander of the Vermont Militia. In 1782 he commanded the militia as it took up defensive positions at Mount Independence and other locations along Lake Champlain to ensure that British troops commanded by Barry St. Leger at Fort Ticonderoga did not attempt an invasion of Vermont.

St. Leger's movements were tied to the Haldimand negotiations, which Enos was aware of and may have participated in. With Vermont unable to attain admission to the union and vulnerable to invasion by the British in Canada, Thomas Chittenden, Ira Allen, Ethan Allen and others conducted talks with the British Governor of Canada that if successful would have had Vermont become a British colony or dominion. Some informants told Haldimand that Enos was willing to raise a regiment for British service if he received a commission in the British Army and if his regiment was treated as a regular Army organization, not as militia.

In historical terms, it is debatable whether Chittenden and his allies were serious about joining the British, or whether they were pretending to negotiate in good faith as a way to prevent British troops from entering and occupying Vermont while also pressuring the Continental Congress to consider Vermont's requests to join the United States. In fact, the negotiations ended with no action taken once the British had left New York City and the Revolution was officially ended.

== Later life ==
In the 1780s Enos was a proprietor of the towns of Waitsfield and Enosburg.

When Vermont reorganized its militia in the late 1780s, Enos was appointed commander of the 1st Division and later the 4th Division as a major general.

In 1791 he relocated to Colchester and resigned his commission. He was a Member of the Vermont Board of War from 1781 to 1792, served in the Vermont House of Representatives, and was a Trustee of the University of Vermont.

== Death and burial ==
After resigning from the militia and his other offices, Enos lived in retirement in Colchester, where he died on October 6, 1808. He is buried in Ethan Allen's plot at Greenmount Cemetery in Burlington. (Some references incorrectly state that he died in Colchester, Connecticut.)

The inscription on Enos' gravestone reads:

Major General Roger Enos, whose remains are deposited here, was a Patriot of the Revolution and assisted in the founding of this State. He died at Colchester, on the 6th day of October, 1808, aged 73 years. This testimony of respect is paid by his surviving children.

(Note: The age given on the gravestone does not compute with the usually accepted year of birth. If Roger Enos was born in 1729, he would have been 78 or 79 when he died.)

== Family ==
In 1763 Enos married Jerusha Hayden. Their children included:

Jerusha Enos (1764–1838), the wife of Ira Allen.

Sibil Enos (1766–1796). She lived in Windsor County, Vermont and was the wife of Noadiah Bissell (1761–1837), a merchant, innkeeper and militia officer. Her name is variously spelled as Sibil, Sybil, Sibbell, etc.

Roger Enos, Jr. (1768–1841) was a proprietor of Irasburg, Vermont. He served as a Justice of the Peace, a Deputy Collector of Customs during the Madison administration, and a member of the Vermont House of Representatives.

Pascal Paoli Enos (1770–1832) graduated from Dartmouth College in 1794, practiced law in Vermont and St. Louis, and was one of the founders of Springfield, Illinois as Receiver of the United States Land Office in Illinois during the Monroe administration.

== External resources ==
- Roger Enos at Find a Grave
