= Benedict Arnold's expedition to Quebec =

1775 U.S. incursion into British Quebec

- Part of American Revolutionary War and Invasion of Quebec (1775)
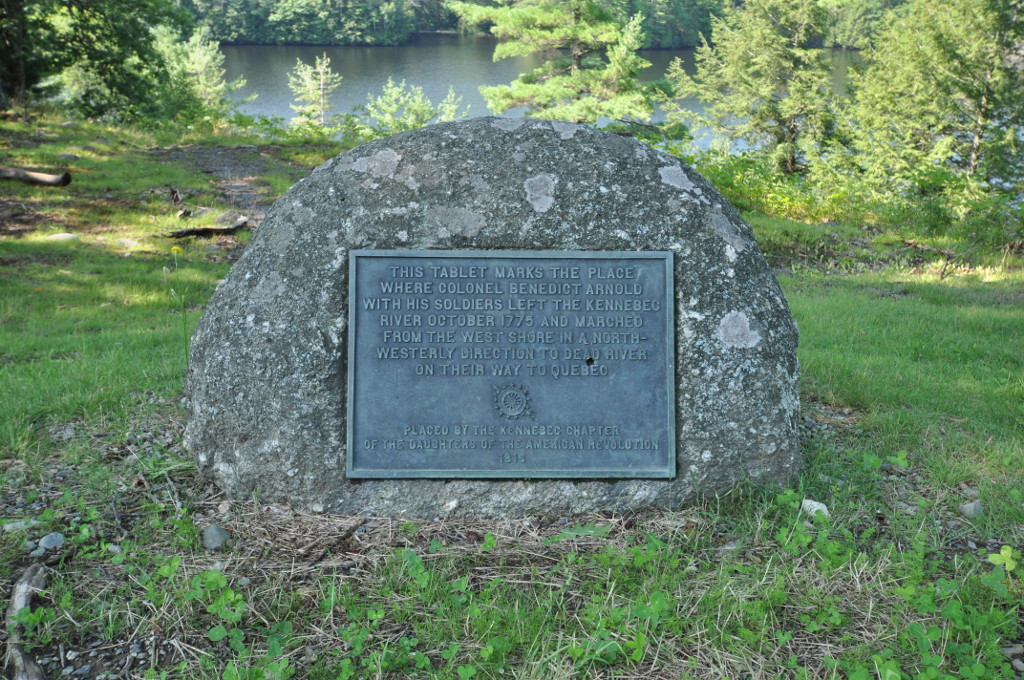
- Marker commemorating the Arnold Trail to Quebec, the "Great Carrying Place" on the Kennebec River in Caratunk, Maine
Date	September 19 – November 13, 1775
Location	Province of Quebec
Result	British victory

Belligerents
Great Britain	United Colonies

Commanders and leaders
Guy Carleton; Allan Maclean	Benedict Arnold

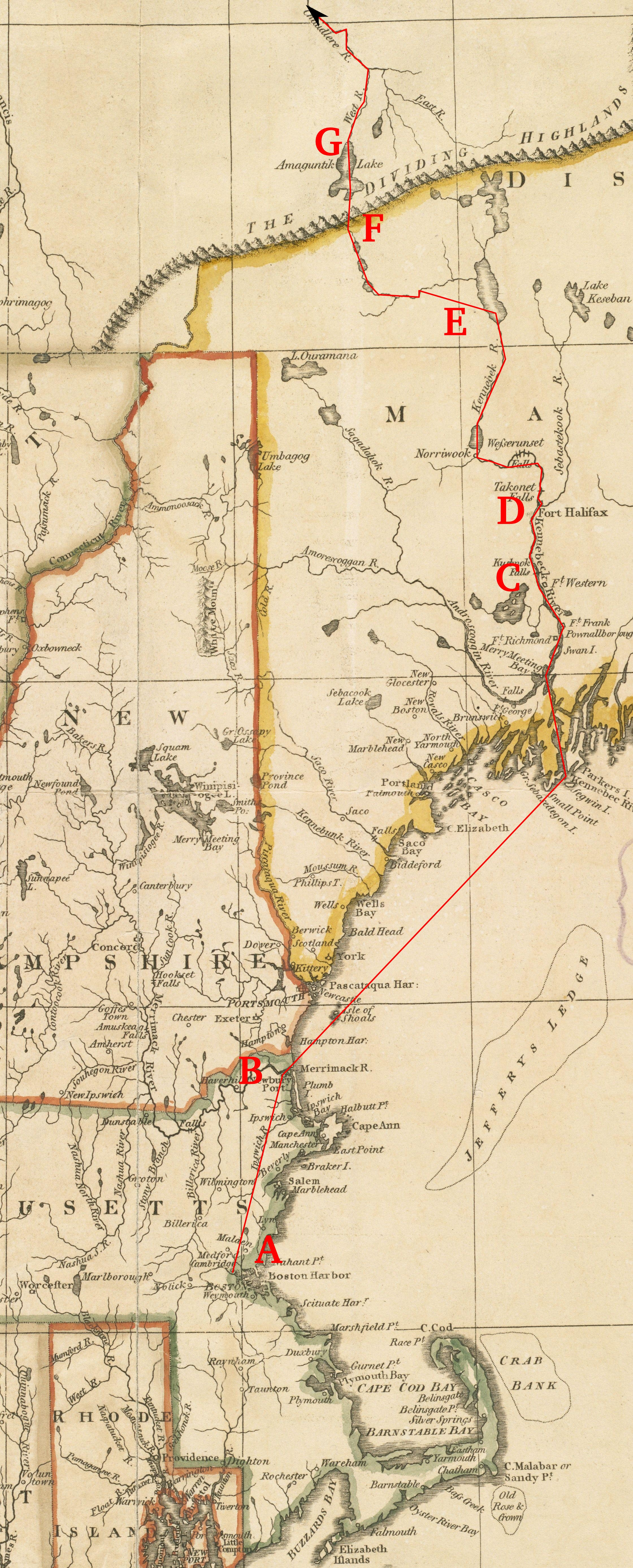
Detail of a 1795 map, overlaid with Arnold's expedition route: *A: Cambridge *B: Newburyport *C: Fort Western *D: Fort Halifax *E: Great Carrying Place *F: Height of land *G: Lake Mégantic This map does not accurately represent the area around the height of land and Lake Mégantic.

In September 1775, early in the American Revolutionary War, Colonel Benedict Arnold led a force of 1,100 Continental Army troops on an expedition from Cambridge in the Province of Massachusetts Bay to the gates of Quebec City. The expedition was part of a two-pronged invasion of the British Province of Quebec, and passed through the wilderness of what is now Maine. The other expedition invaded Quebec from Lake Champlain, led by Richard Montgomery.

Unanticipated problems beset the expedition as soon as it left the last significant colonial outposts in Maine. The portages up the Kennebec River proved grueling, and the boats frequently leaked, ruining gunpowder and spoiling food supplies. More than a third of the men turned back before reaching the height of land between the Kennebec and Chaudière rivers. The areas on either side of the height of land were swampy tangles of lakes and streams, and the traversal was made more difficult by bad weather and inaccurate maps. Many of the troops lacked experience handling boats in white water, which led to the destruction of more boats and supplies in the descent to the Saint Lawrence River via the fast-flowing Chaudière.

By the time that Arnold reached the settlements above the Saint Lawrence River in November, his force was reduced to 600 starving men. They had traveled about 350 miles (560 km) through poorly charted wilderness, twice the distance that they had expected to cover. Arnold's troops crossed the Saint Lawrence on November 13 and 14, assisted by the local French-speaking Canadiens, and attempted to put Quebec City under siege. Failing in this, they withdrew to Point-aux-Trembles until Montgomery arrived to lead an unsuccessful attack on the city. Arnold was rewarded for his effort in leading the expedition with a promotion to brigadier general.

Arnold's route through northern Maine has been listed on the National Register of Historic Places as the Arnold Trail to Quebec, and some geographic features in the area bear names of expedition participants.

== Background ==
On May 10, 1775, shortly after the American Revolutionary War began, Benedict Arnold and Ethan Allen led an expedition that captured Fort Ticonderoga on Lake Champlain in the British Province of New York. Allen and Arnold were aware that Quebec was lightly defended; there were only about 600 regular troops in the entire province. Arnold, who had done business in the province before the war, also had intelligence that the French-speaking Canadiens would be favorably disposed toward a colonial force.

Arnold and Allen each made arguments to the Second Continental Congress that Quebec could and should be taken from the British, pointing out that the British could use Quebec as a staging area for attacks down Lake Champlain and into the Hudson River valley. Congress did not want to alarm the people of Quebec, and rejected these arguments. In July, amid concerns that the British might use Quebec as a base for military movements into New York, they changed their position, and authorized an invasion of Quebec via Lake Champlain, assigning the task to Major General Philip Schuyler of New York.

== Planning ==
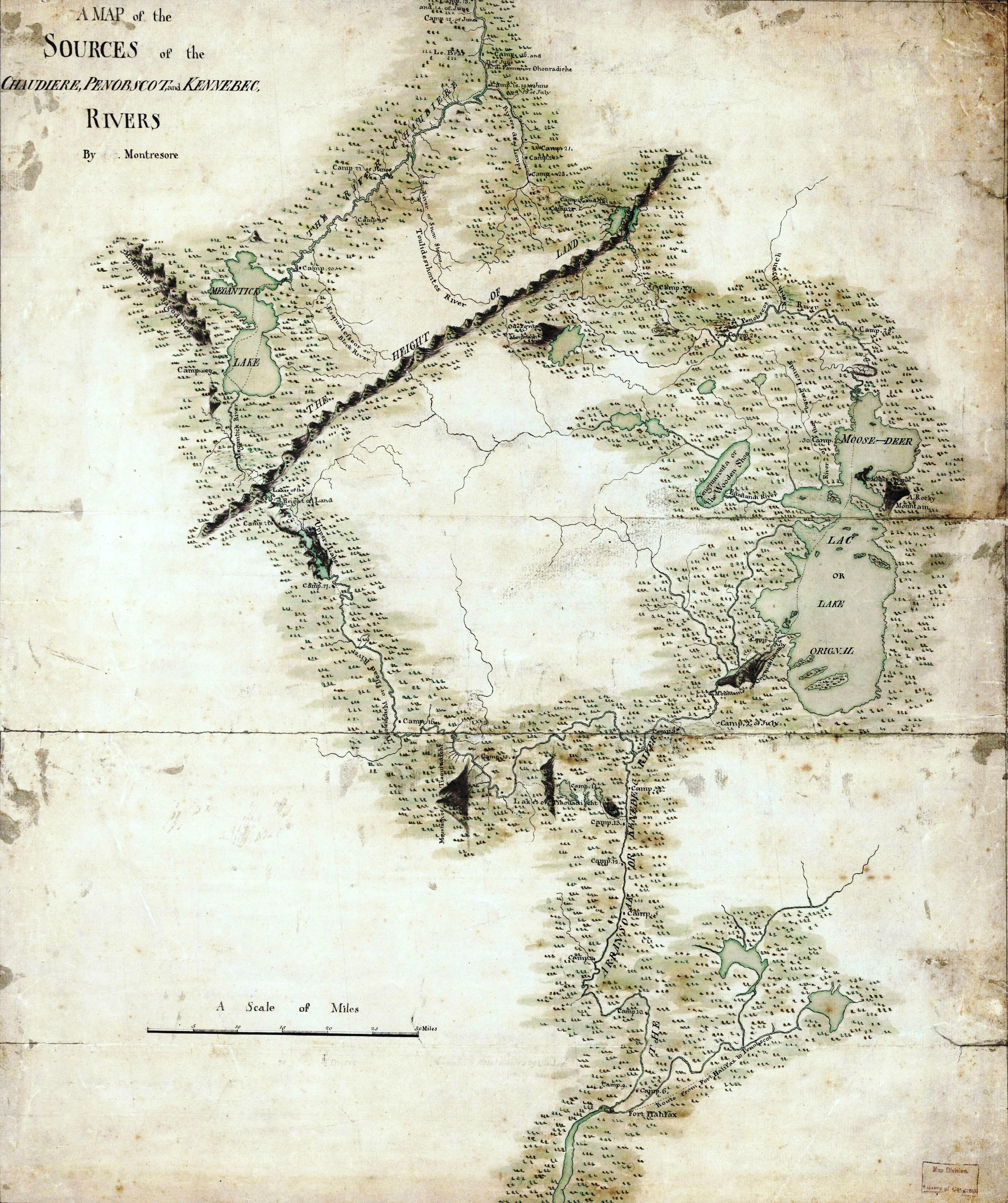
A 1760 map by British engineer John Montresor that Arnold used as a guide

Arnold, who had hoped to lead the invasion, decided to pursue a different approach to Quebec. He went to Cambridge, Massachusetts in early August, and approached George Washington, Commander-in-Chief of the Continental Army, with the idea of a second eastern invasion force aimed at Quebec City. Washington approved of the idea in principle, but sent a message to General Schuyler on August 20 to ensure his support of the endeavor, since the two forces would need to coordinate their efforts.

Arnold's plan called for the expedition to sail from Newburyport, Massachusetts along the coast and then up the Kennebec River to Fort Western (now Augusta, Maine). From there, they would use shallow-draft river boats called bateaux to continue up the Kennebec River, cross the height of land to Lake Mégantic, and descend the Chaudière River to Quebec. Arnold expected to cover the 180 miles (290 km) from Fort Western to Quebec in 20 days, despite the fact that little was known about the route. Arnold had acquired a map (copy pictured at right) and journal made by British military engineer John Montresor in 1760 and 1761, but Montresor's descriptions of the route were not very detailed, and Arnold did not know that the map contained some inaccuracies or that some details had been deliberately removed or obscured.

Washington introduced Arnold to Reuben Colburn, a boat builder from Gardinerstown, Maine, who was in Cambridge at the time. Colburn offered his services, and Arnold requested detailed information about the route, including potential British naval threats, Indian sentiment, useful supply opportunities, and an estimate of how long it would take to construct bateaux sufficient for the contemplated force. Colburn left for Maine on August 21 to fulfill these requests. Colburn asked Samuel Goodwin, the local surveyor in Gardinerston, to provide maps for Arnold. Goodwin, who was known to have Loyalist sympathies, provided maps that were inaccurate in the routes, distances and other important features they described.

On September 2, Washington received a letter from General Schuyler in reply to his August 20 message. Schuyler agreed with the suggested plan, and Washington and Arnold immediately began to raise troops and place orders for supplies.

== Recruitment and preparations for departure ==
Because there had been little direct action at Boston after the Battle of Bunker Hill in June, many units stationed in the American camps besieging the town were bored with garrison life and eager for action. Arnold selected a force of 750 men from the large number who expressed interest in the proposed expedition. Most of these were divided into two battalions: one commanded by Lieutenant Colonel Roger Enos and the other by Lieutenant Colonel Christopher Greene. The rest were placed in a third battalion under Daniel Morgan that included three companies—250 men—of Continental riflemen from Virginia and the Pennsylvania Rifle Regiment. These frontiersmen, from the Virginia and Pennsylvania wilderness, were better suited to wilderness combat than to a siege, and had been causing trouble since arriving outside Boston. The entire force numbered about 1,100. Among the volunteers were other men who rose to later prominence during and after the war, including Aaron Burr, Return J. Meigs, Henry Dearborn, and John Joseph Henry.

Washington and Arnold were concerned about Indian support for (or opposition to) the effort, as well as the reception Arnold's forces might receive from the Canadians once they arrived near the Saint Lawrence River. On August 30, Washington wrote to General Schuyler of a meeting he held with an Abenaki chief, "[The chief] says the Indians of Canada in general, and also the French, are greatly in our favor, and determined not to act against us." Four Abenakis accompanied the expedition as scouts and guides.

== Cambridge to Fort Western ==
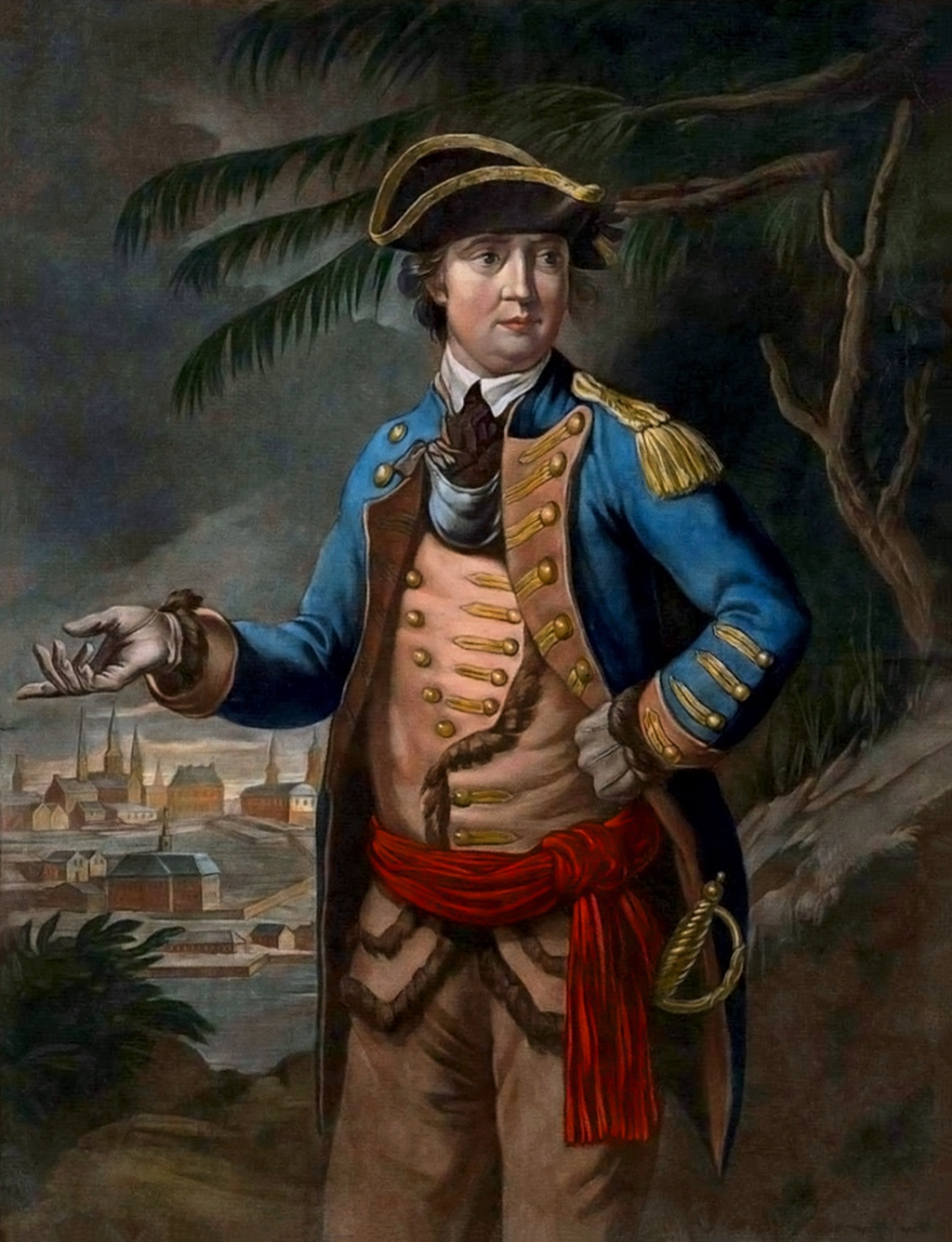
A 1776 mezzotint of Benedict Arnold by Thomas Hart

On September 2, as soon as General Schuyler's agreement with the expedition was known, Arnold wrote a letter to Nathaniel Tracy, a merchant of his acquaintance in Newburyport. He asked Tracy to acquire sufficient shipping to transport the expedition to Maine without drawing the attention of Royal Navy ships patrolling the area. The sea voyage was viewed by both Arnold and Washington as the most dangerous part of the expedition, because British patrols were highly effective at interfering with colonial shipping at the time.

The expedition began its departure from Cambridge on September 11, marching to Newburyport. The first units to leave were composed largely of men from that area, to whom Arnold had given extra time so that they would be able to see their families once more before the expedition left Newburyport. The last troops marched off on September 13; Arnold rode from Cambridge to Newburyport on September 15 after making final purchases of supplies.

Headwinds and fog delayed the departure of the expedition from Newburyport until September 19. In twelve hours, they reached the mouth of the Kennebec River. They spent the next two days negotiating the island channels near its mouth and sailing up the river. Arriving in Gardinerston on the 22nd, they spent the next few days at Reuben Colburn's house, organizing supplies and preparing the boats they would use for the rest of the expedition. Arnold inspected Colburn's hastily constructed bateaux, finding them, in a portent of troubles to come, to be "very badly built", and "smaller than the directions given". Colburn and his crew spent the next three days building additional bateaux.

Arnold's troop movements did not escape British notice. General Thomas Gage in Boston was aware that Arnold's troops were "gone to Canada and by way of Newburyport", but he believed the target to be Nova Scotia, which was at the time virtually undefended. Francis Legge, the governor of Nova Scotia declared martial law, and on October 17 sent a message to England laden with rumors about American actions that turned out to be false. Admiral Samuel Graves eventually received intelligence about Arnold's activities, reporting on October 18 that the American troops "went up the Kennebec River, and 'tis generally believed are for Quebec".

== Scouting ==
As the troop transports arrived, Arnold dispatched some of the men in the already-constructed bateaux up the Kennebec River 10 miles (16 km) to Fort Western, and the others by foot on a track leading to Fort Halifax, 45 miles (72 km) up the Kennebec. While waiting for the bateaux to be completed, Arnold received word from scouts Colburn had sent out to reconnoiter the proposed route. Their reports included rumors of a large Mohawk force near the southernmost French settlements on the Chaudière River. The source of these rumors was Natanis, a Norridgewock Indian believed to be spying for Quebec's governor, General Guy Carleton; Arnold discounted the reports.

Arnold and most of the force had reached Fort Western by September 23. The next day, Arnold sent two small parties up the Kennebec. One, under Pennsylvania Lieutenant Archibald Steele, was ordered to scout as far as Lake Mégantic to gather intelligence. The second, under Lieutenant Church, was to survey the route as far as the Dead River, at a place known to the local Indians as the Great Carrying Place, so that Arnold might better estimate how far the column would need to travel each day.

== Early troubles ==
The full expedition set out from Fort Western on September 25. Morgan's riflemen led the way, blazing trails when necessary. Colburn and a crew of boatwrights came in the rear, to repair bateaux as needed. Morgan's group traveled relatively lightly, as they would be working to make the trail, while the last group, commanded by Lieutenant Colonel Enos, carried the bulk of the supplies. The expedition arrived at its first target, Fort Halifax (Maine), a decaying relic of the French and Indian War, on the second day. There was a rough track from Fort Western, so some of the men and supplies had moved overland rather than in the bateaux that had to be portaged around the falls above Fort Western to begin the trip. Arnold, rather than traveling in a heavy bateau, traveled in a lighter canoe so that he might move more rapidly among the troops along the travel route.

Arnold reached Norridgewock Falls, location of the last settlements on the Kennebec, on October 2. Even at this early date, problems were apparent. The bateaux were leaking, resulting in spoiled food and a continual need for repairs. The men were constantly wet, due not only to the leakage but also the frequent need to pull the heavy boats upstream. As temperatures began to drop below freezing, colds and dysentery set in, reducing the effectiveness of the force.

The portage around Norridgewock Falls, a distance of about one mile (1.6 km), was accomplished with the assistance of oxen provided by the local settlers, but it took almost a week to complete; Arnold did not depart from there until October 9. Colburn's crew devoted some of this time to making repairs on the bateaux. Most of the expedition reached the Great Carrying Place on October 11, and Arnold arrived the next day. This stretch of the trek was complicated by heavy rains, rendering the portages difficult due to extremely muddy conditions.

== The Great Carrying Place ==
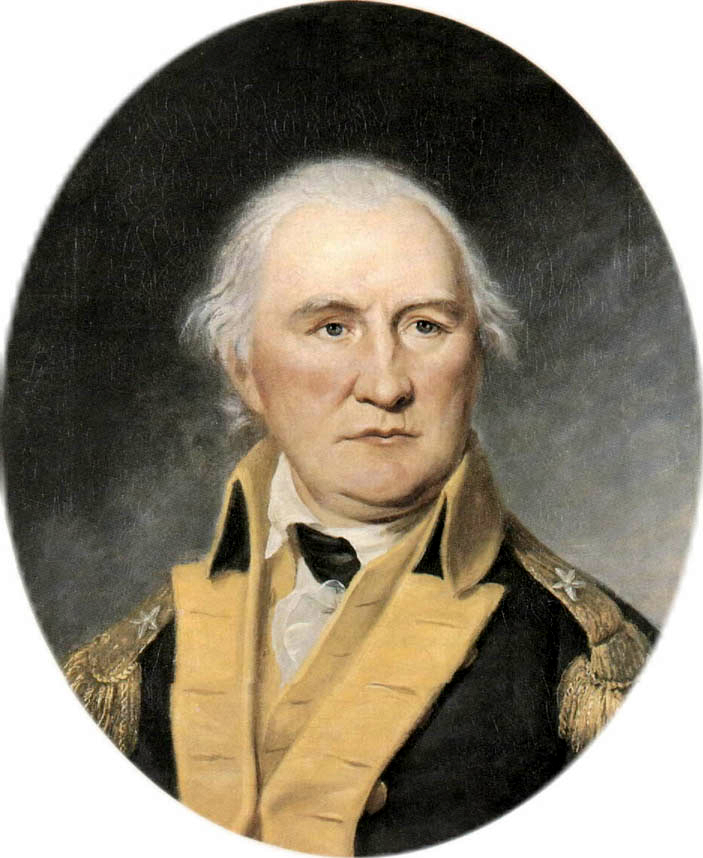
Daniel Morgan, by Charles Willson Peale

The Great Carrying Place was a portage of roughly 12 miles (19 km), bypassing an unnavigable section of the Dead River, the tributary of the Kennebec that the expedition was to follow. The portage included a rise in elevation of about 1,000 feet (300 m) to the high points of the carry, with three ponds along the way. Lieutenant Church, the leader of the survey team, described the route as a "bad road but capable of being made good", an assessment that turned out to be somewhat optimistic.

The vanguard of the main body, led by Daniel Morgan, met Lieutenant Steele's scouting party en route to the first pond. This party had successfully scouted the route to the height of land above the Dead River, but the men were near starvation. Their supplies had been depleted, and they were largely subsisting on a protein-rich diet of fish, moose, and duck. Most of the men continued to supplement their meager supplies with the local wildlife as the expedition continued.

Church, in his description of the route, had failed to account for the heavy rains and the boggy conditions between the first and second ponds. Rain and snow slowed the long portage, and the expedition had its first casualty when a falling tree killed one of the party. Some of the men who drank the stagnant waters along the way became violently ill, forcing Arnold to order construction of a shelter at the second pond as cover for the sick, and to send some men back to Fort Halifax for supplies that had been cached there.

The first two battalions finally reached the Dead River on October 13, and Arnold arrived three days later. At this point, Arnold wrote a number of letters informing Washington and Montgomery of his progress. Several letters intended for Montgomery were intercepted and turned over to Quebec's Lieutenant Governor Hector Theophilus de Cramahé, giving Quebec its first notice that the expedition was on its way. Arnold also dispatched the survey team again, this time to mark the trail all the way to Lake Mégantic.

== Ascending the Dead River ==
Progress up the Dead River was extremely slow. Contrary to its name, which supposedly described the speed of its currents, the river was flowing rapidly enough that the men had trouble rowing and poling against the current. The leaky boats spoiled more of the food, forcing Arnold to put everyone on half rations. Then, on October 19, the skies opened, and the river began to rise in the pouring rain. Early on October 22, the men awoke to discover that the river had risen to the level of their camp, and they had to scramble to even higher ground for safety. When the sun rose they were surrounded by water.

After spending most of that day drying out, the expedition set off on October 23. Precious time was lost when some of the men mistakenly left the Dead River and ascended one of its branches, having been fooled by the high water. Soon after, seven bateaux overturned, spoiling the remaining food stores. This accident compelled Arnold to consider turning back. He called together his nearby officers for a council of war. Arnold explained that although the situation was grim, he thought that the expedition should continue. The officers agreed, and decided to pick an advance party that would proceed as rapidly as possible to French settlements on the Chaudière, and work to bring supplies back. The sick and infirm were to retreat to American settlements in Maine.

Further back on the route, Lieutenant Colonel Greene and his men were starving. They had little flour, and were consuming candle tallow and shoe leather to supplement their minimal rations. On October 24, Greene attempted to catch up with Arnold, but was unable to do so because Arnold had moved too far ahead. When he returned to camp, Lieutenant Colonel Enos had arrived, and they held their own council. Enos's captains were united in wanting to turn back despite Arnold's most recent orders, which were to press ahead. In the council, Enos cast a tie-breaking vote in favor of continuing, but in a meeting with his captains after the council, announced that because they were insistent on returning, he was acceding to their decision, and would return. After giving Greene's men some of his supplies, Enos and 450 men turned back.

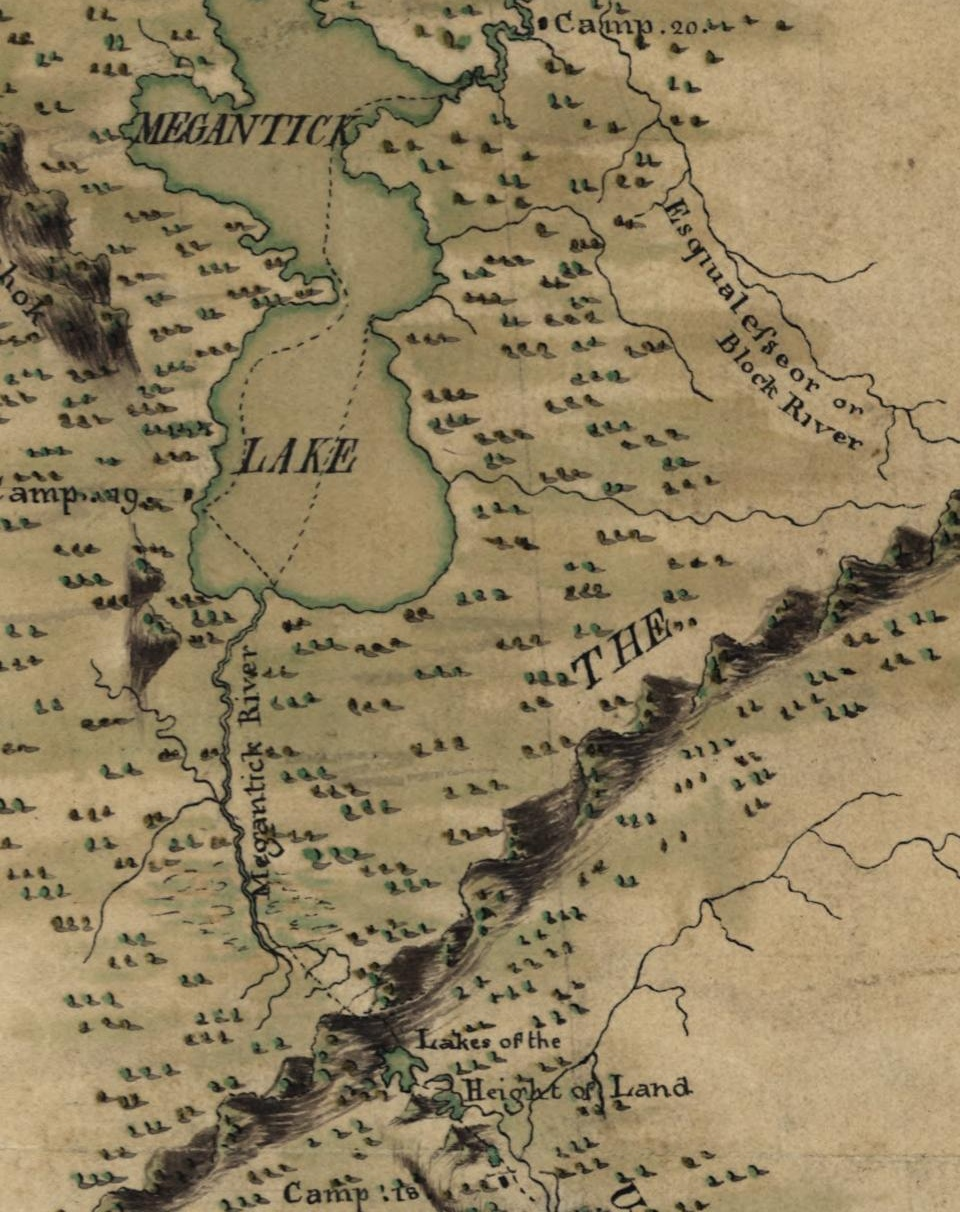
Detail from Montresor's map showing the height of land; Spider Lake and swampy areas are absent.

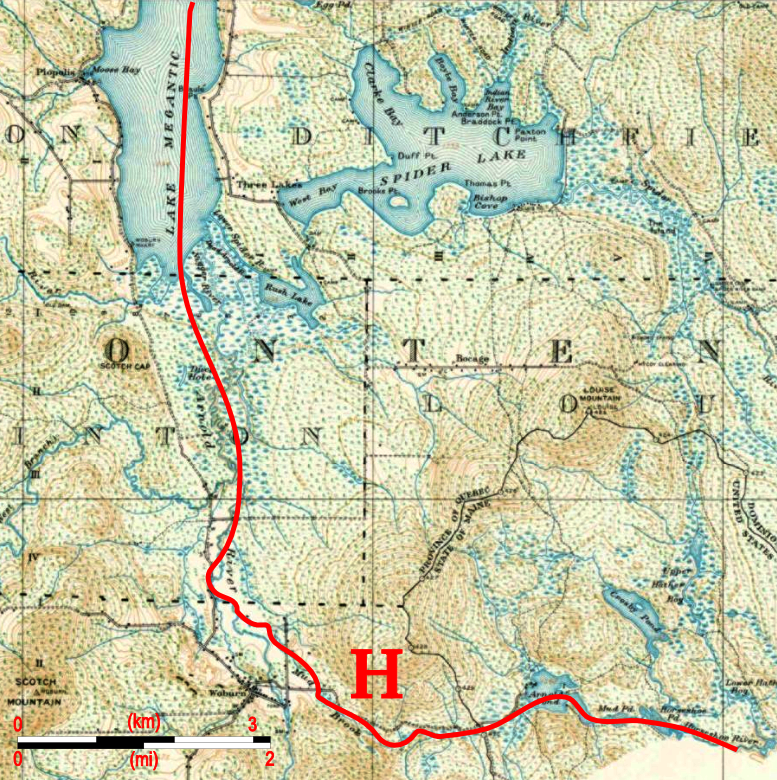
Detail from a 1924 topographic map of the same area, annotated with Arnold's approximate route over the height of land (H). Note Spider Lake and swamps shown to the east of Lake Mégantic; parts of the expedition were lost for days there.

== Lake Mégantic ==
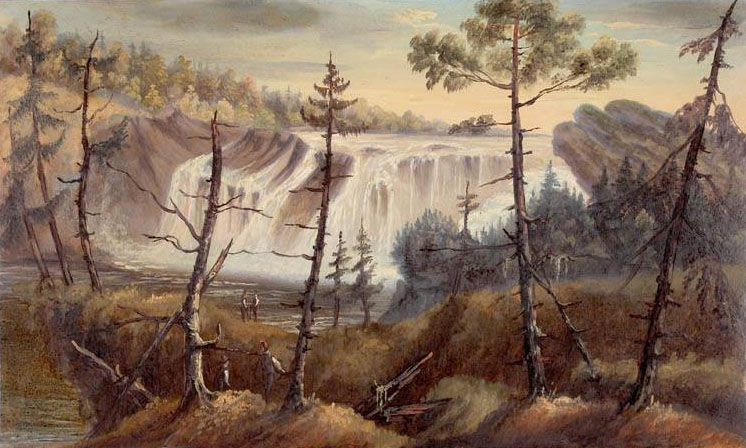
Chaudière Falls, painting by Joseph Légaré

The impact of the inaccurate maps was felt when the expedition reached the height of land. Portions of the advance party became lost in swampy bogs (the area surrounding Spider Lake on the topographic map shown above) that were not on those maps, resulting in delays reaching Lake Mégantic. Although this part of the party crossed the height of land on October 25, it was not until two days later that they reached the lake. On October 28, the advance party descended the upper Chaudière, destroying three of their bateaux when they turned over and crashed into rocks above some falls on the river. The next day they encountered several Penobscot Indians, who confirmed that they were not far from Sartigan, the southernmost French settlement on the Chaudière.

Arnold, when he reached Lake Mégantic, sent a man back to the two remaining battalions with instructions on how to navigate the swampy lands above the lake. However, the way Arnold described the route included information from the incorrect maps that he had not seen on the route. As a result, some elements of the expedition spent two days lost in swamps before the majority finally reached the falls on the upper Chaudière on October 31. Along the way, Captain Henry Dearborn's dog was eaten, an event recorded in his diary: "[They ate] every part of him, not excepting his entrails; and after finishing their meal, they collected the bones and carried them to be pounded up, and to make broth for another meal."

== Arrival at Quebec ==
Arnold first made contact with the local population on October 30. Sympathetic to his plight, they supplied provisions and cared for the sick; some were well paid for their aid, while others refused payment. Arnold distributed copies of a letter written by Washington asking the habitants to assist the expedition, and Arnold added promises to respect the persons, property, and religion of the locals. Jacques Parent, a Canadien from Pointe-Levi, notified Arnold that Lieutenant Governor Cramahé had ordered the destruction of all boats on the southern banks of the Saint Lawrence after receiving the intercepted communications.

On November 9 the expedition finally reached the Saint Lawrence at Pointe-Levi, across the river from Quebec. Arnold had about 600 of his original 1,100 men, and the journey had turned out to be 350 miles (560 km), not the 180 that Arnold and Washington had thought it would be. From John Halstead, a New Jersey-born businessman who operated a mill near Pointe-Levi, Arnold learned of the arrest of his courier and the interception of some of his letters. Halstead's mill became the organizing point for the crossing of the Saint Lawrence. Some of Arnold's men purchased canoes from the habitants and the local Saint Francis Indians, and then transported them from the Chaudière to the mill site. The forces crossed the Saint Lawrence on the night of November 13–14 after three days of bad weather, likely crossing the mile-wide river between the positions of HMS Hunter and HMS Lizard, two Royal Navy ships that were guarding the river against such a crossing.

The city of Quebec was then defended by about 150 men of the Royal Highland Emigrants under Lieutenant Colonel Allen Maclean, supported by about 500 poorly organized local militia and 400 marines from the two warships. When Arnold and his troops finally reached the Plains of Abraham on November 14, Arnold sent a negotiator with a white flag to demand their surrender, to no avail. The Americans, with no cannons or other field artillery, and barely fit for action, faced a fortified city. After hearing rumors of a planned sortie from the city, Arnold decided on November 19 to withdraw to Pointe-aux-Trembles to wait for Montgomery, who had recently captured Montreal.

== Aftermath ==
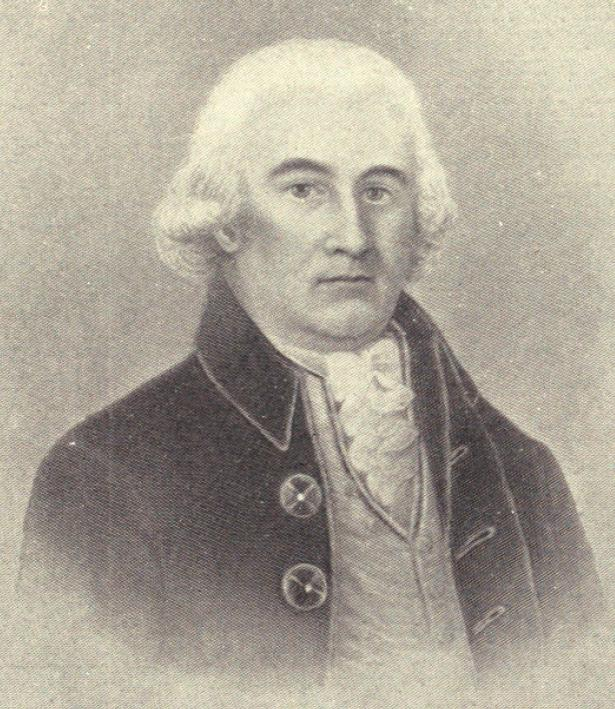
Roger Enos, one of Arnold's subordinate commanders on the Quebec expedition

When Montgomery arrived at Pointe-aux-Trembles on December 3, the combined force returned to the city and began a siege, finally assaulting it on December 31. The battle was a devastating loss for the Americans; Montgomery was killed, Arnold was wounded, and Daniel Morgan was captured along with more than 350 men. Arnold did not learn until after the battle that he had been promoted to brigadier general for his role in leading the expedition.

The invasion ended with a retreat back to Fort Ticonderoga, Montgomery's starting point, during the spring and summer of 1776. Arnold, who commanded the army's rear guard in the later stages of the retreat, was able to delay the British advance sufficiently to prevent them from attempting to reach the Hudson River in 1776.

Enos and his detachment arrived back in Cambridge late in November. Enos was court-martialed, charged with "quitting his commanding officer without leave". He was acquitted, and returned to service as Lieutenant Colonel of the 16th Connecticut Regiment.

John Sullivan, the court-martial President, made public a written statement in support of Enos' conduct, and other officers also issued a public circular to support Enos, including William Heath, John Stark, Joseph Reed, and James Reed.

Enos subsequently moved to Vermont, where he served in the militia as Colonel, Brigadier General and Major General, including commanding troops on the Vermont side of Lake Champlain during the Saratoga campaign to deter John Burgoyne from foraying into Vermont.

Reuben Colburn was never paid for his work, despite promises made by Arnold and Washington; the expedition ruined him financially.

Henry Dearborn settled on the Kennebec River after the war, and represented the area in the U.S. Congress before President Thomas Jefferson appointed him Secretary of War in 1801. Private Simon Fobes, who kept one of the many journals of the expedition, was captured in the Battle of Quebec. He and two others escaped captivity in August 1776 and retraced the trek in the opposite direction, once again with meager resources. They benefited from better weather and equipment the expedition had abandoned along the way. Fobes reached his home near Worcester, Massachusetts at the end of September, and eventually rejoined the army. Captain Simeon Thayer kept a journal which was published by the Rhode Island Historical Society in 1867 as The invasion of Canada in 1775. After being captured at Quebec, Thayer was exchanged on July 1, 1777, and returned to the Continental Army with the rank of major. He distinguished himself during the siege of Fort Mifflin in November 1777 and briefly assumed command after the post's commandant was wounded.

== Legacy ==
- Arnold Trail to Quebec
- U.S. National Register of Historic Places
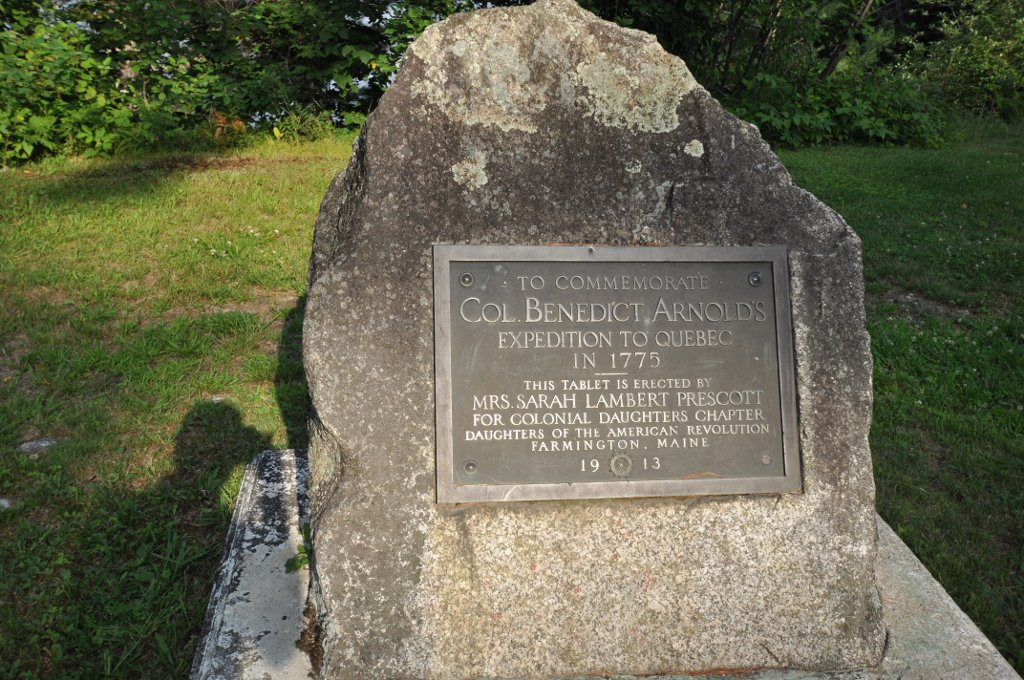
- Commemorative marker in Eustis, Maine
- Built: 1775
- NRHP reference No.: 69000018
- Added to NRHP: October 1, 1969

A number of geographic features along the route of the expedition bear names related to the expedition. East Carry Pond, Middle Carry Pond, and West Carry Pond are all on the route of the portage at the Great Carrying Place, which is in the Carrying Place Town Township [sic] of Maine. Arnold Pond is the last pond on the Dead River before crossing the height of land. Mount Bigelow in Maine was named for Major Timothy Bigelow, one of Arnold's officers.

The wilderness portion of the route through Maine, roughly from Augusta to the Quebec border, was added to the National Register of Historic Places in 1969 as the "Arnold Trail to Quebec". The Major Reuben Colburn House, which served as Arnold's headquarters, is now a state historic site administered by the non-profit Arnold Expedition Historical Society, and is also listed on the National Register. Both Fort Western and Fort Halifax are National Historic Landmarks, primarily for their age and their role in earlier conflicts.

A historical marker in Danvers, Massachusetts commemorates Arnold's expedition, placed by the Massachusetts Society, Sons of the American Revolution. There is also a historical marker in Moscow, Maine placed in 1916 by the Kennebec chapter of the Daughters of the American Revolution, and two at Skowhegan Island in Maine placed in 1912 and 2000 by the Eunice Farnsworth Chapter of the Daughters of the American Revolution. In Eustis, Maine, on the western shore of Flagstaff Lake, stands a marker commemorating the expedition. The lake was created in the 20th century by damming the Dead River, inundating part of the expedition route. Mount Bigelow, whose first recorded ascent was by Timothy Bigelow, stands just south of the lake.

In September and October 1975, there was a reenactment of this expedition as part of the United States Bicentennial celebrations.
