= Pittston, Maine =

Town in Maine, United States

- Town
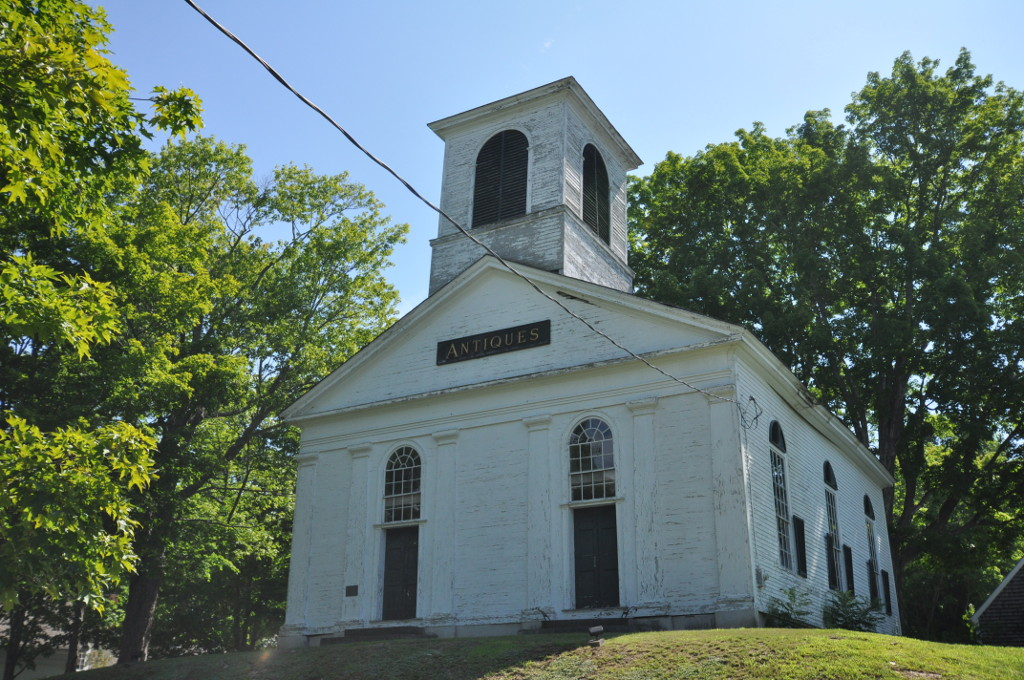
- Pittston Congregational Church in 2018

- Seal
- Motto: "Country Living on the Kennebec"
- Location in Kennebec County and the state of Maine.
- Coordinates: 44°09′34″N 69°42′43″W
- Country: United States
- State: Maine
- County: Kennebec
- Incorporated: 1779
- Villages: Pittston; Bailey Corner; East Pittston; North Pittston

Area
  - Total: 33.44 sq mi (86.61 km^{2})
  - Land: 32.17 sq mi (83.32 km^{2})
  - Water: 1.27 sq mi (3.29 km^{2})
- Elevation: 131 ft (40 m)

Population (2020)
  - Total: 2,875
  - Density: 89/sq mi (34.5/km^{2})
- Time zone: UTC-5 (Eastern (EST))
  - Summer (DST): UTC-4 (EDT)
- ZIP Code: 04345
- Area code: 207
- FIPS code: 23-59110
- GNIS feature ID: 582677
- Website: www.pittstonmaine.org

Pittston is a town in Kennebec County, Maine, United States. The population was 2,875 at the 2020 census. The town was named after the family of John Pitt, who were early settlers. Pittston is included in the Augusta, Maine micropolitan New England City and Town Area.

The historic Major Reuben Colburn House and Pittston Congregational Church are located in Pittston.

== Geography ==
According to the United States Census Bureau, the town has a total area of 33.44 square miles (86.61 km^{2}), of which 32.17 square miles (83.32 km^{2}) is land and 1.27 square miles (3.29 km^{2}) is water.

== Demographics ==
Historical population
Census	Pop.	Note	%±
1790	704		—
1800	1,408		100.0%
1810	1,018		−27.7%
1820	1,337		31.3%
1830	1,799		34.6%
1840	2,460		36.7%
1850	2,823		14.8%
1860	2,619		−7.2%
1870	2,353		−10.2%
1880	2,458		4.5%
1890	1,281		−47.9%
1900	1,177		−8.1%
1910	954		−18.9%
1920	816		−14.5%
1930	893		9.4%
1940	1,114		24.7%
1950	1,258		12.9%
1960	1,311		4.2%
1970	1,617		23.3%
1980	2,267		40.2%
1990	2,444		7.8%
2000	2,548		4.3%
2010	2,666		4.6%
2020	2,875		7.8%
U.S. Decennial Census

=== 2010 census ===
As of the census of 2010, there were 2,666 people, 1,103 households, and 758 families living in the town. The population density was 82.9 inhabitants per square mile (32.0/km^{2}). There were 1,202 housing units at an average density of 37.4 per square mile (14.4/km^{2}). The racial makeup of the town was 96.4% White, 0.3% African American, 0.9% Native American, 0.4% Asian, 0.2% from other races, and 1.8% from two or more races. Hispanic or Latino of any race were 0.7% of the population.

There were 1,103 households, of which 27.9% had children under the age of 18 living with them, 56.4% were married couples living together, 8.0% had a female householder with no husband present, 4.4% had a male householder with no wife present, and 31.3% were non-families. 23.8% of all households were made up of individuals, and 9.6% had someone living alone who was 65 years of age or older. The average household size was 2.42 and the average family size was 2.82.

The median age in the town was 44.8 years. 20.6% of residents were under the age of 18; 6.2% were between the ages of 18 and 24; 23.6% were from 25 to 44; 35.1% were from 45 to 64; and 14.5% were 65 years of age or older. The gender makeup of the town was 50.5% male and 49.5% female.

=== 2000 census ===
As of the census of 2000, there were 2,548 people, 1,010 households, and 730 families living in the town. The population density was 79.2 inhabitants per square mile (30.6/km^{2}). There were 1,070 housing units at an average density of 33.3 per square mile (12.9/km^{2}). The racial makeup of the town was 97.72% White, 0.20% African American, 0.75% Native American, 0.08% Asian, 0.24% from other races, and 1.02% from two or more races. Hispanic or Latino of any race were 0.63% of the population.

There were 1,010 households, out of which 34.0% had children under the age of 18 living with them, 59.9% were married couples living together, 8.1% had a female householder with no husband present, and 27.7% were non-families. 21.4% of all households were made up of individuals, and 8.6% had someone living alone who was 65 years of age or older. The average household size was 2.52 and the average family size was 2.92.

In the town, the population was spread out, with 24.3% under the age of 18, 6.2% from 18 to 24, 29.6% from 25 to 44, 28.1% from 45 to 64, and 11.8% who were 65 years of age or older. The median age was 40 years. For every 100 females, there were 101.3 males. For every 100 females age 18 and over, there were 96.4 males.

The median income for a household in the town was $39,609, and the median income for a family was $45,769. Males had a median income of $35,507 versus $25,317 for females. The per capita income for the town was $19,059. About 5.4% of families and 7.3% of the population were below the poverty line, including 6.6% of those under age 18 and 12.6% of those age 65 or over.

== Notable people ==
- David Agry, jurist
- Reuben Colburn, shipbuilder and patriot (1740-1818)
- Albert G. Jewett, jurist and diplomat (1802–1885)
- Charles Melville Scammon, 19th-century whaleman, naturalist, and author (1825–1911)
- John F. Young, Episcopal Bishop of Florida; translator of Silent Night from the original German
