= Theodorick Bland (congressman) =

American politician

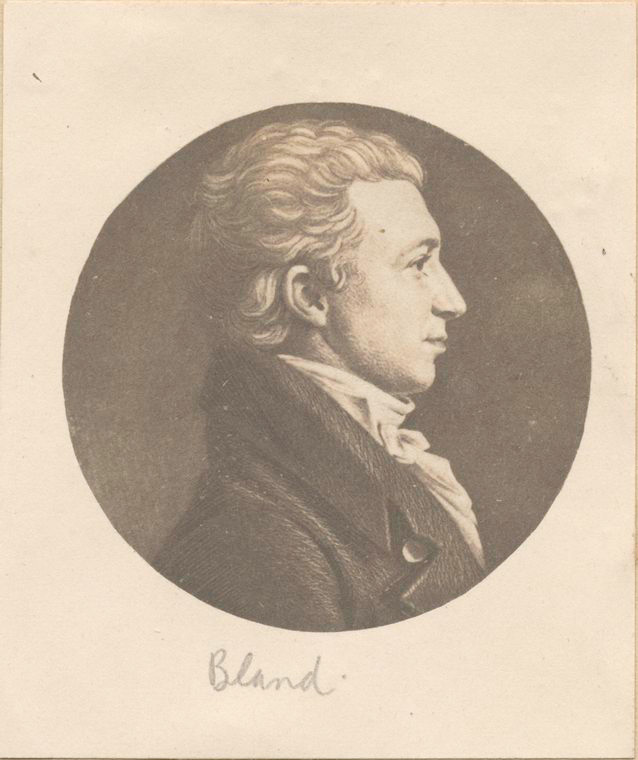

Member of the U.S. House of Representatives from Virginia's 9th district
- In office March 4, 1789 – June 1, 1790
- Preceded by: position established
- Succeeded by: William B. Giles

Delegate to the Congress of the Confederation from Virginia
- In office November 1, 1780 – October 30, 1783

Member of the Virginia House of Delegates from Prince George County
- In office October 16, 1786 – October 18, 1789 Serving with Edmund Ruffin Jr., Edmund Harrison
- Preceded by: Edward Bland
- Succeeded by: Richard Bland

Personal details
- Born: March 21, 1741 Prince George County, Colony of Virginia, U.S.
- Died: June 1, 1790 (aged 49) New York City, U.S.
- Resting place: Congressional Cemetery, Washington, District of Columbia
- Spouse: Martha Daingerfield
- Profession: Planter, physician, politician

Military service
- Allegiance: Continental Army
- Branch/service: Virginia Militia
- Rank: Colonel
- Unit: 1st Continental Light Dragoons
- Battles/wars: American Revolutionary War; Battle of Brandywine

Theodorick Bland (March 21, 1741 – June 1, 1790), also known as Theodorick Bland, Jr., was an American planter, physician, soldier, and politician from Prince George County, Virginia. A major figure in the formation of the new United States government, Bland represented Virginia in both the Continental Congress and the United States House of Representatives (until his death in office), as well as served multiple terms in the Virginia House of Delegates representing Prince George County, which he also represented in the Virginia Ratification Convention (and unsuccessfully opposed ratification).

== Early life and education ==
Bland was born in Prince George County in 1741 to a prominent planter family in colonial Virginia. His parents were Theodorick Bland of Cawsons and Frances Elizabeth (Bolling) Bland. His mother was the only child and heir of Captain Drury Bolling and Elizabeth Meriweather of "Kippax," which plantation the younger Theodorick subsequently inherited and operated.

His ancestors had settled in Virginia years earlier, became civic leaders (hence sometimes referred to as the First Families of Virginia) and prospered by operating plantations using enslaved labor. Like his father (who served in the initial Virginia Senate during the American Revolutionary War representing Prince George County and nearly Isle of Wight and Surry Counties), he was named after Theodorick Bland of Westover, who had served as Speaker of the House of Burgesses in 1660 and also represented Charles City County then new Henrico County) from 1661 until his death, probably in 1672. His grandfather, Richard Bland, had married Elizabeth Randolph, daughter of William Randolph of Turkey Island. His uncle, also named Richard Bland, his father's first cousin Peyton Randolph, and his second cousin Thomas Jefferson would precede him in being elected to state legislative posts as well as Congress.

At age 11, after being tutored at home as was customary for his class, he was sent to Great Britain for his education, accompanied by an enslaved boy, Tom, as his body servant. Bland studied first in Yorkshire. Next he went to Scotland to study medicine at the University of Edinburgh, graduating as a doctor in 1763.

== Early career and marriage ==
Bland then returned to Virginia and began a medical practice, as well as following family traditions of political involvement and farming using enslaved labor. He married Martha Daingerfield in 1768 and they likely settled at Kippax about that time. (His parents had moved to Cawsons.) Thus Bland became a planter and major slaveholder. Bland retired from medical practice in the late 1760s, "in favor of farming and politics". He became active in politics before the war, serving as the Clerk of Prince George County.

== Revolutionary War ==
As the Revolution neared, Bland's Whig views aligned him with the rebels. He or his father published letters criticizing Lord Dunmore in the Virginia Gazette under the pseudonym "Cassius". In 1775 Bland joined the local "Committee of Intelligence" as well as helped locate arms and munitions for the patriot cause. In June 1776, Bland accepted a commission as captain in Virginia's cavalry. He rose quickly to Colonel and commanded the 1st Continental Light Dragoons, often cited as "Bland's Virginia Horse" in Revolutionary dispatches and correspondence. In the latter capacity Bland reported directly to General Washington. He would retire in 1779 from active cavalry service due to poor health, which he had suffered from his youth.

Bland's observations at Brandywine supplied General Washington with the correct location of Lord Cornwallis's and Howe's main armies; Bland wrote two separate dispatches, and Col. James Ross of the 8th Pennsylvania wrote another dispatch reporting on British troop movements. Both men's dispatches supported that of Col. Hazen. However, their dispatches were initially misinterpreted, until it was almost too late. Without the accurate contributions of Bland, Ross, and Hazen, a worse result might have befallen Washington's army at Brandywine.

Some later accounts have Bland's Virginia Horse subsequently assigned to scouting duty. In his 1922 biography of John Randolph, the historian William Cabell Bruce suggested that the Brandywine incident encouraged Washington to use his cavalries more for scouting rather than sitting in formation on the front lines, as they had at Brandywine. However, the lack of scouting had led to the Brandywine errors.

At Gen. Washington's request, when Bland returned to Virginia to recuperate in 1779, he also served as Warden at Charlottesville over British officers taken prisoner. He also worked to keep Washington's officers and cavalry supplied with quality horses both from his own stables and from others. As a participant in the early American horse-racing community, Bland owned a large stable and had access to other horses through relatives and friends. Bland had earlier retired from his active medical practice for the same health issues in the late 1760s, nearly a decade before the war had begun, and finally was allowed to retire from the military for health reasons in late 1779. He did, however, in 1785, accept a commission from Gov. Patrick Henry as the Prince George County Lieutenant, with military responsibilities.

== Planter ==
As a planter like his father, grandfather and namesake, Bland cultivated tobacco, indigo and wheat. In the 1787 Virginia tax census, he owned 18 enslaved Blacks at least 16 years old, and 13 under that age, as well as 11 horses, 21 cattle and a 4-wheeled chariot. As mentioned below, his father had moved to Amelia County after the conflict, but died before that tax census. Thus, his father's estate also owned 13 enslaved adult Blacks in Amelia County, Virginia, as well as 10 younger slaves and four horses.

== Politician ==
Bland's political career had begun before the Revolution, when he served as the Clerk of Prince George County, and had considerable contact with the House of Burgesses. Following the war, Bland continued as the county's Clerk, which caused him to communicate with the Virginia General Assembly, in which his father served in the Virginia Senate and Edmund Bland served in the Virginia House of Delegates. In 1780, the General Assembly named Bland as one of Virginia's delegates to the Continental Congress, where he served until 1783 and thus helped form the new United States government.

After his father moved to Amelia County, Bland took over Cawsons (apparently about 1783-1784 after his return to Virginia from the Continental Congress and his father's death.) Bland then operated Kippax as an out-plantation. In 1786, Bland was elected to the Virginia House, where he served until 1788.

In 1788, Prince George voters elected Bland and Ruffin as their delegate to the Virginia Convention called to ratify the United States Constitution. Bland voted against ratification, as he believed it yielded too much power to a central government.

After the constitution was adopted, Virginia legislators elected to Bland the First United States Congress (he ran unopposed). He served in the House of Representatives from March 4, 1789, until his death in 1790 at the age of 49. He died while attending the Congress in New York City, and William B. Giles of Amelia County was selected as his successor. Bland was the first member of the House of Representatives to die in office. William Branch Giles completed his term.

== Death and legacy ==
Coat of Arms of Theodorick Bland

Bland was originally buried in New York's Trinity Churchyard in Lower Manhattan. (Trinity Church was designated in the late 20th century as a National Historic Landmark). In 1828, his remains were moved and reinterred in the Congressional Cemetery in Washington, D.C.

His wife Martha Bland survived him and married two more times. She was an independent woman, maintaining the Bland holdings by executing marriage contracts to control her own lands.

Bland bequeathed 2 acres of land on Blandford Hill next to the church to create a school to educate youth, but insisted that it be established within 15 years of his death, which bequest lapsed because no school was constructed.

Although the buildings of Kippax Plantation are long gone, and the town of Hopewell grew on the site, it has recently been purchased by the Archaeological Conservancy, and archaeological excavations are ongoing.

== See also ==
- List of members of the United States Congress who died in office (1790–1899)

U.S. House of Representatives
Preceded by District created	Member of the U.S. House of Representatives from Virginia's 9th congressional district March 4, 1789 - June 1, 1790	Succeeded by William B. Giles
