= Richard Bland =

American politician

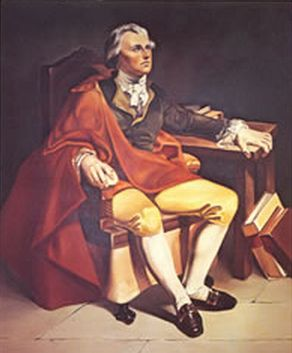

First and Second Continental Congresses as delegate from Virginia
- In office September 5, 1774 – August 12, 1775

Burgess representing Prince George County
- In office 1742–1776 Serving with Francis Eppes, Stephen Dewey, Alexander Bolling, Richard Bland Jr, Peter Poythress
- Preceded by: Robert Munford
- Succeeded by: position abolished

Personal details
- Born: May 6, 1710 Prince George County, Colony of Virginia, British America
- Died: October 26, 1776 (aged 66) Williamsburg, Colony of Virginia, British America
- Resting place: Jordan Point Plantation, Prince George County
- Education: College of William & Mary; Edinburgh University
- Occupation: planter, lawyer, politician

Richard Bland (May 6, 1710 – October 26, 1776), sometimes referred to as Richard Bland II or Richard Bland of Jordan's Point, (Note: Richard Bland's father, Richard Bland, is also referred to in some sources as Richard Bland of Jordan's Point.) was an American Founding Father, planter, lawyer and politician from Virginia. A cousin and early mentor of Thomas Jefferson, Bland served 34 years in the Virginia General Assembly, and with John Robinson and this man's cousin Peyton Randolph as one of the most influential and productive burgesses during the last quarter century of the colonial period.

In 1766, Bland wrote an influential pamphlet, An Inquiry into the Rights of the British Colonies, questioning the right of the British Parliament to impose taxes on colonists without their consent. He later served in the First Continental Congress where he signed the Continental Association, a trade embargo adopted in October 1774 in opposition to Parliament's so-called Intolerable Acts. Bland retired from the Second Continental Congress due to his age in August 1775, two months after the creation of the Continental Army. However, he remained active in Virginia politics and helped draft a constitution for the newly-formed state in June 1776. Bland was named to Virginia's House of Delegates when it was formed in October 1776, the same month as his death.

== Early life and education ==
Born on May 6, 1710, to Elizabeth Randolph (1680–1720) (daughter of William Randolph), the second wife of prominent planter Richard Bland, he was born either at his father's main plantation on the James River called "Jordan's Point" or at the family's "Bland House" in Williamsburg. Both his mother and father were of the First Families of Virginia, intermarrying and wielding economic, social and political power in the colony for generations. His namesake, Theodorick Bland of Westover, had immigrated to the Virginia colony in 1654 after the death of his older brother Edward Bland, in order to manage the family's mercantile and shipping enterprises in Virginia. The eldest Theodorick established Berkeley Plantation and Westover Plantation on the James River, as well as the Bland house in Jamestown (the preceding colonial capitol), and served several terms in the House of Burgesses and was its speaker in 1660. He married Anna Bennett, the daughter of Virginia Governor Richard Bennett, who bore three sons: Theodorick Jr., Richard I (this man's father), and John.

As his family's second son in an age of primogeniture, Richard Bland I moved further upstream on the James River and started his own plantation, on land his father had purchased in 1656, and which became located in Prince George County, Virginia. Samuel Jordan had established a plantation there in 1620, calling it "Beggar's Bush," which later became better known as "Jordan's Journey." Richard Bland I had seven children by his first wife, Mary Swann (d.1700), the daughter of councillor Thomas Swann, but none survived their mother. His parents had married in 1702, and Elizabeth had borne two daughters before this boy's birth, and would bear another daughter and son, Theodorick (b. 1718). His sisters all married burgesses: Mary Bland (b.1703) married Capt. Henry Lee I, Elizabeth Bland (b.1706) married William Beverley and Anna Bland (b.1711) married Robert Munford.

Both his parents died just before his tenth birthday in 1720. His mother died on January 22 and his father on April 6. His uncles, William and Richard Randolph, looked after his farm and early education and raised, as guardians, Richard and his siblings.

Bland became close friends with his first cousin, Peyton Randolph, that would last throughout their lives, often sitting side by side during their years of service in the House of Burgesses, the Committee of Safety, and the First and Second Continental Congresses. Another of Richard's and Peyton's first cousins, Jane Randolph Jefferson, had a son Thomas Jefferson who followed his cousins and mentors to the House of Burgesses and the Continental Congresses.

Richard attended the College of William & Mary and, like many of his time, completed his education in Scotland at Edinburgh University. He studied law and was admitted to the bar in 1746, but never offered his legal services to the public.

== Planter ==
Upon reaching legal age, Bland inherited his father's Jordan Point plantation and other land. He farmed using enslaved labor. At his death, his estate included 30 slaves.

== Early political career ==
Bland served as a justice of the peace in Prince George County and was made a militia officer in 1739. In 1742, he was elected to the Virginia House of Burgesses, where he served successive terms until it was suppressed during the American Revolution. Bland's thoughtful work made him one of its leaders, although he was not a strong speaker. He frequently served on committees whose role was to negotiate or frame laws and treaties. Sometimes described as a bookish scholar as well as farmer, Bland read law and was admitted to the Virginia bar in 1746. He did not practice before the courts but collected legal documents and became known for his expertise in Virginia and British history and law.

Bland often published pamphlets (frequently anonymously), as well as letters. His first widely distributed public paper came as a result of the Parson's Cause, which was a debate from 1759 to 1760 over the established church and the kind and rate of taxes used to pay the Anglican clergy. His pamphlet A Letter to the Clergy on the Two-penny Act was printed in 1760, as he opposed increasing pay and the creation of a bishop for the colonies.

An early critic of slavery, though a slaveholder, Bland stated "under English government all men are born free", which prompted considerable debate with John Camm, a professor at Bland's alma mater, the College of William & Mary.

== Colonial rights advocate ==
When the Stamp Act created controversy throughout the colonies, Richard Bland thought through the entire issue of parliamentary laws as opposed to those that originated in the colonial assemblies. While others, particularly James Otis, get more credit for the idea of "no taxation without representation", the full argument for this position seems to come from Bland. In early 1766, he wrote An Inquiry into the Rights of the British Colonies, which was published in Williamsburg and reprinted in England. Bland's Inquiry examines the relationship of the king, parliament, and the colonies. While he concludes that the colonies were subject to the crown and that colonists should enjoy the rights of Englishmen, he questions the presumption that total authority and government came through parliament and its laws. Jefferson described the work as "the first pamphlet on the nature of the connection with Great Britain which had any pretension to accuracy of view on that subject...There was more sound matter in his pamphlet than in the celebrated Farmer's letters."

In September 1774, the Virginia Burgesses sent Bland to the First Continental Congress in Philadelphia. Some of the views expressed in An Inquiry into the Rights of the British Colonies found their way into the first session of the Congress and were included in the Declaration of Rights. Bland was elected to the Second Continental Congress, serving until August 12, 1775, when he declined another term because of his age.

== Founding the state of Virginia ==
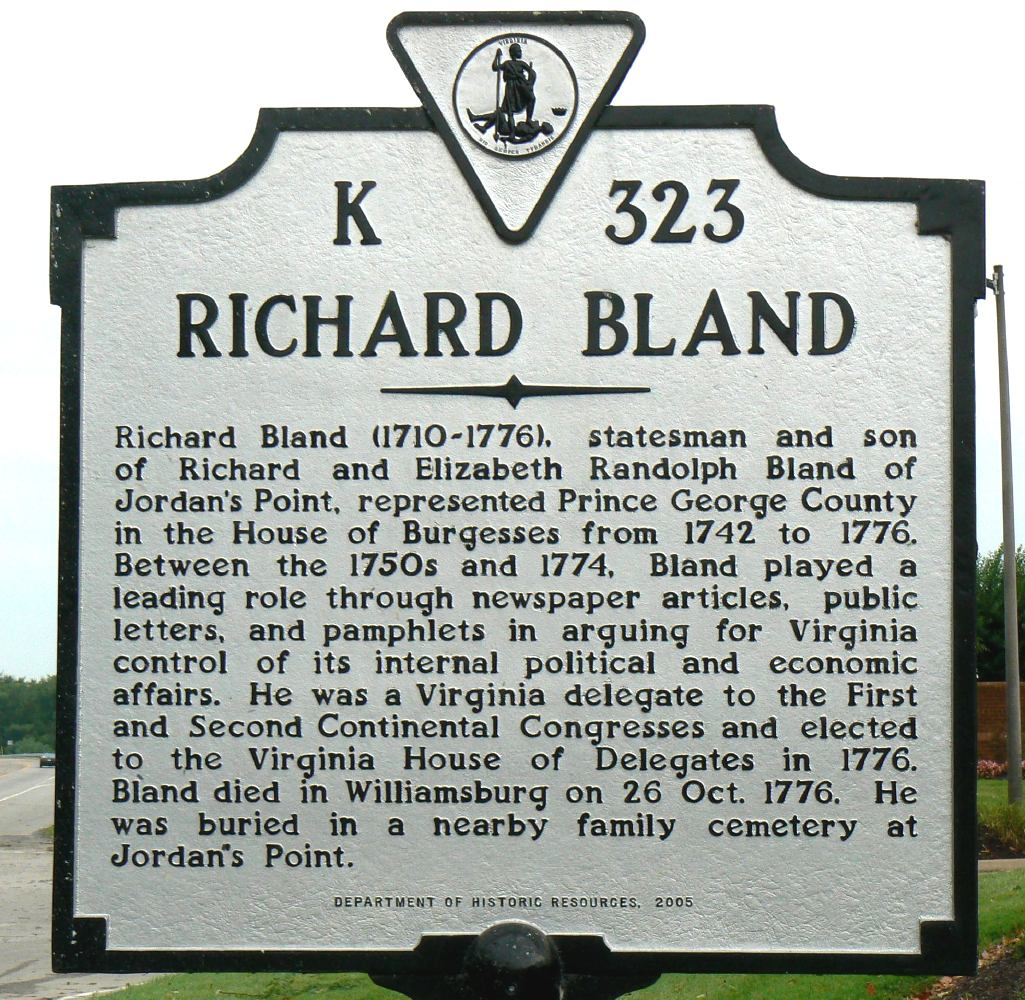
Virginia Dept. Historic Resources sign at Jordan Point near the burial place of Richard Bland, on the south bank of the James River near Hopewell.

In 1775, as revolution neared in Virginia, the Virginia Convention replaced the Burgesses and the council as a form of ad-hoc government. That year he met with the Burgesses and with the three sessions of the convention. In March 1775, after Patrick Henry's "Give me liberty or give me death!" speech, he was still opposed to taking up arms. He believed that reconciliation with England was still possible and desirable. Nevertheless, he was named to the committee of safety and re-elected as a delegate to the national Congress. In May, he travelled to Philadelphia for the opening of the Second Continental Congress, but soon returned home, withdrawing because of the poor health and failing eyesight of old age. However, his radicalism had increased, and by the convention's meeting in July, he proposed hanging Lord Dunmore, the royal governor.

In the first state convention meeting of 1776, Richard Bland declined a re-election to the Third Continental Congress, citing his age and health. However, he played an active role in the remaining conventions. He served on the committee which drafted Virginia's first constitution in 1776. When the House of Delegates for the new state government was elected, he was one of the members.

== Personal life ==
Bland married three times, and survived all his wives. His first wife, Anne Poythress (December 13, 1712 – April 9, 1758), was the daughter of Colonel Peter and Ann Poythress, from Henrico County, Virginia. The couple married at Jordan's Point on March 21, 1729, and she bore six sons and six daughters before her death in 1758:

- Richard Bland (b. 20 February 1731)
- Elizabeth Bland (b. 17 March 1733)
- Ann Bland (b. 15 August 1735)
- Peter Bland (b. 2 February 1737, d.16 February 1781)
- John Bland (b. 19 October 1739)
- Mary Bland (b. 15 January 1741)
- William Bland (b. 26 December 1742)
- Theodorick Bland (b. 28 September 1744)
- Edward Bland (b. 16 December 1746)
- Sarah Bland (b. 19 September 1750)
- Susan Bland (b. 20 February 1752)
- Lucy Bland (b. 22 September 1754).

On January 1, 1759, the widower Bland married the widow Martha Macon Massie, who died eight months after their marriage. In 1760 he married for a third time to Elizabeth Blair Bolling, widow of John Bolling Jr. (son of John Bolling) and sister of councilor John Blair. She died late in April 1775, and like Martha Massie Boling, bore no children during her marriage to Richard Bland.

== Death and legacy ==
Bland collapsed on a Williamsburg street on October 26, 1776, and died later that evening at the house of John Tazewell. On November 7, he was buried in the family cemetery at Jordan's Point in Prince George County. Bland owned an extensive library for his time, much of which was acquired after his death by Jefferson and his nephew-in-law St. George Tucker, and made its way to the Library of Congress as part of Jefferson's personal library donation in 1815.

Virginia's Bland County and Richard Bland College, the junior college of the College of William & Mary, are named in his honor.
