= Prince George County, Virginia =

County in Virginia, United States

- County
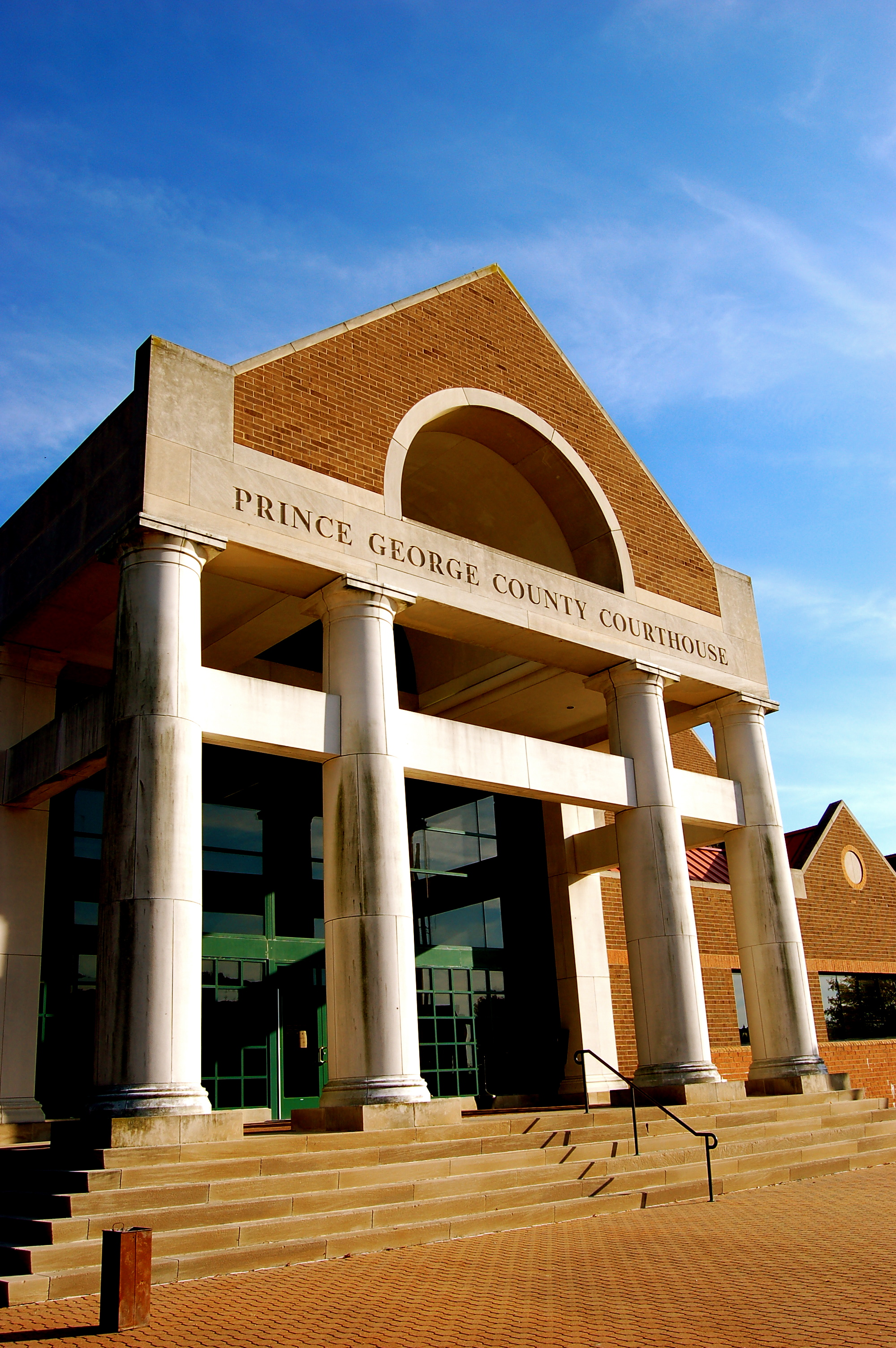
- The Prince George County Courthouse in 2007

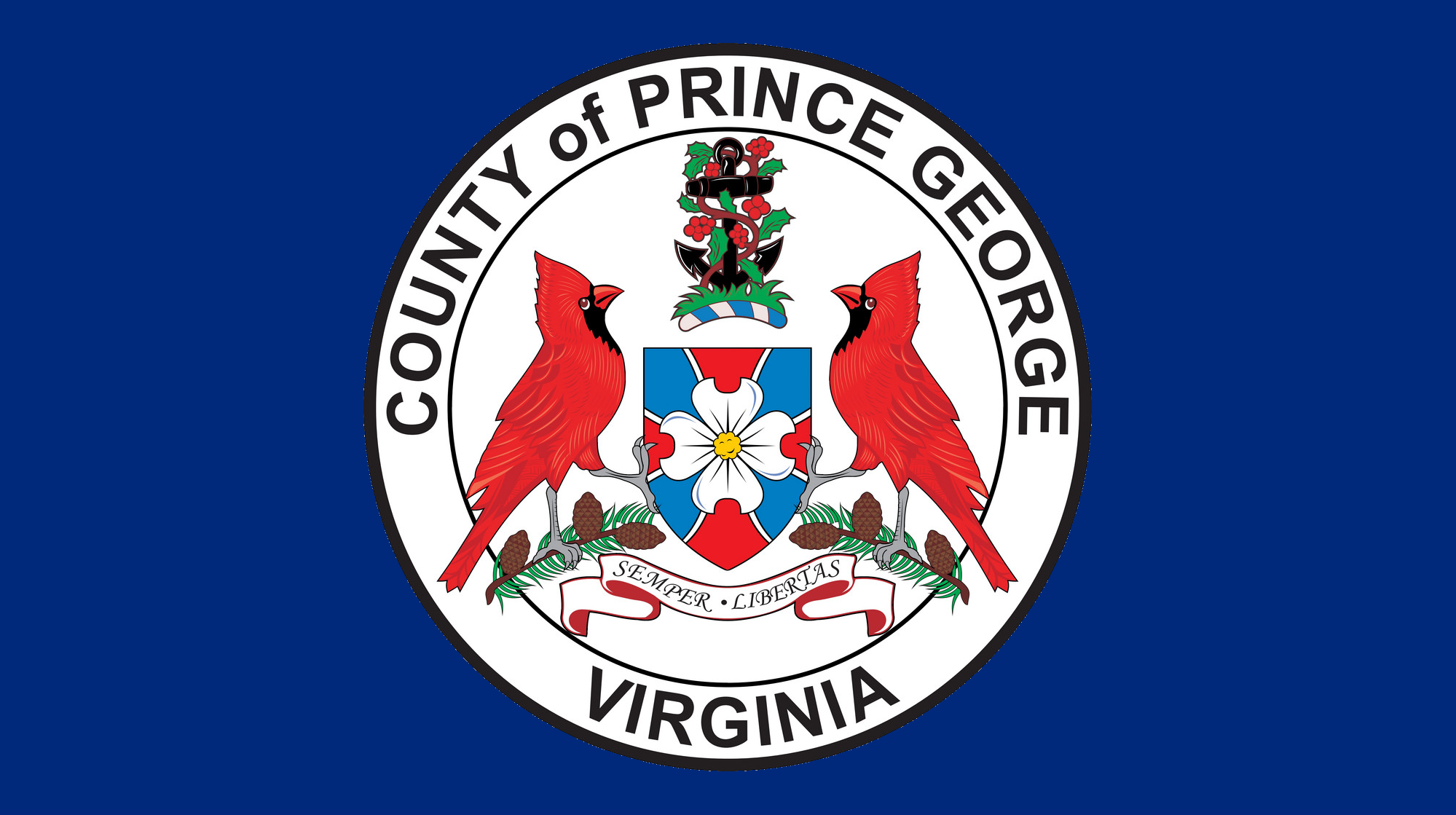
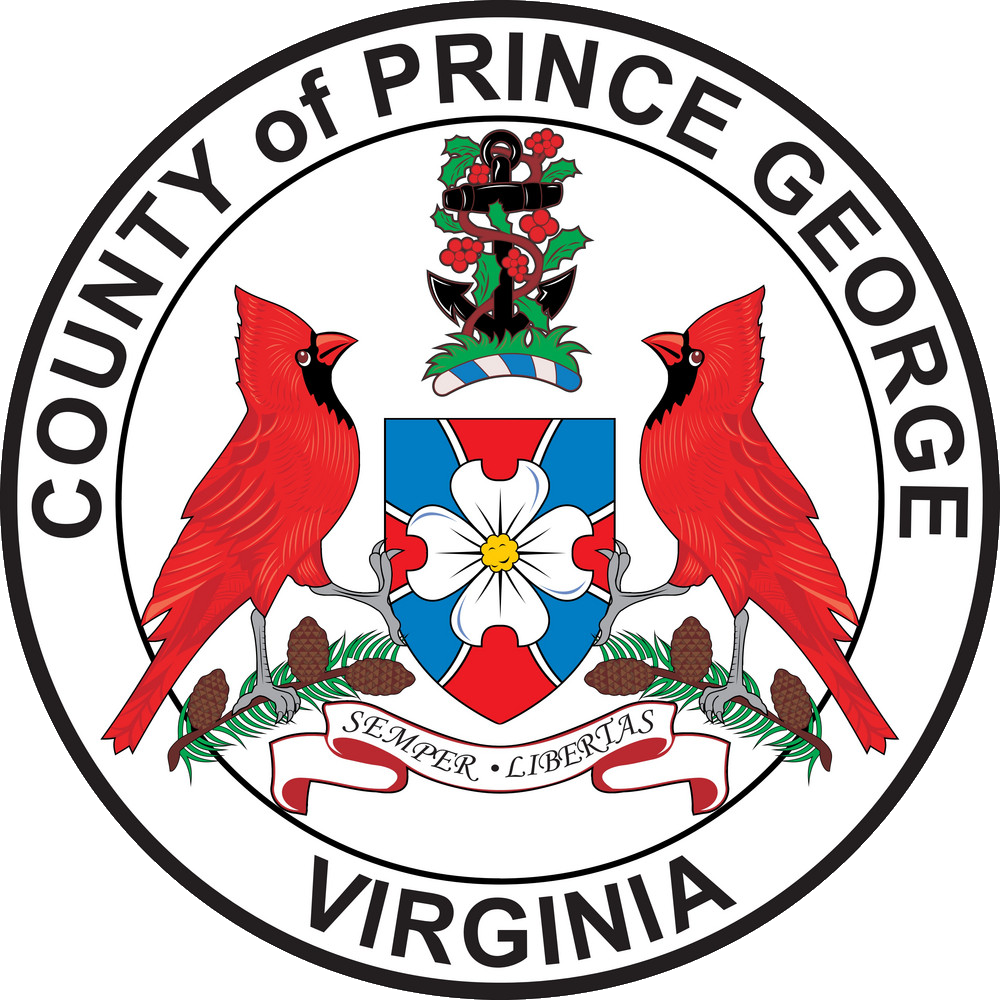
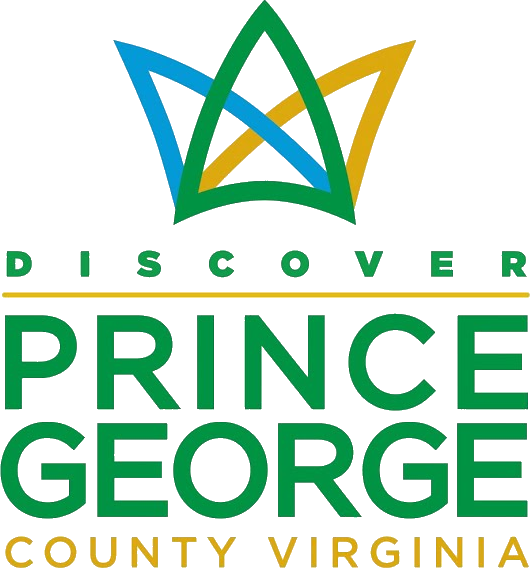
- Flag Seal Logo
- Motto: "Semper Libertas"
- Location within the U.S. state of Virginia
- Coordinates: 37°11′N 77°13′W
- Country: United States
- State: Virginia
- Founded: 1703
- Named for: Prince George of Denmark
- Seat: Prince George
- Largest community: Fort Lee

Area
  - Total: 282 sq mi (730 km^{2})
  - Land: 265 sq mi (690 km^{2})
  - Water: 17 sq mi (44 km^{2}) 5.9%

Population (2020)
  - Total: 43,010
  - Estimate (2025): 43,936 ▲
  - Density: 162/sq mi (62.7/km^{2})
- Time zone: UTC−5 (Eastern)
  - Summer (DST): UTC−4 (EDT)
- Congressional district: 4th
- Website: www.princegeorgecountyva.gov

Prince George County is a county located in the Commonwealth of Virginia. As of the 2020 census, the population was 43,010. Its county seat is Prince George.

Prince George County is located within the Greater Richmond Region of the U.S. state of Virginia.

== History ==
The coat of arms of Prince George County, adopted in 1976.

Prince George County was formed in 1703 in the Virginia Colony from the portion of Charles City County that was south of the James River. It was named in honor of Prince George of Denmark, husband of Anne, Queen of Great Britain.

In 1619, "Charles Cittie" [sic] was one of four "boroughs" or "incorporations" created by the Virginia Company. The first Charles City County courthouses were located along the James River at Westover Plantation on the north side and City Point on the south side. The Virginia Company lost its charter in 1624, and Virginia became a royal colony. Charles City Shire was formed in 1634 in the Virginia Colony by order of Charles I, King of England. It was named as Charles City County in 1643.

Charles Cittie, Charles City Shire, and Charles City County all extended to both sides of the James River, which was the major transportation thoroughfare of the Virginia Colony throughout the 17th century. The original central city of Charles City County was Charles City Point, which was in an area south of the James River at the confluence of the Appomattox River. The name was later shortened to City Point.

In 1703, all of the original area of Charles City County south of the James River was severed to form Prince George County. As population increased, portions were divided and organized as several additional counties. City Point became an incorporated town in Prince George County.

=== 20th century to present ===
Annexed by the independent city of Hopewell in 1923, City Point is no longer in the county.

Nearby the current bridges, this water-only section of the county at the Appomattox River was the site of a fatal bus accident at an open drawbridge on December 22, 1935; thirteen people died.

== Geography ==
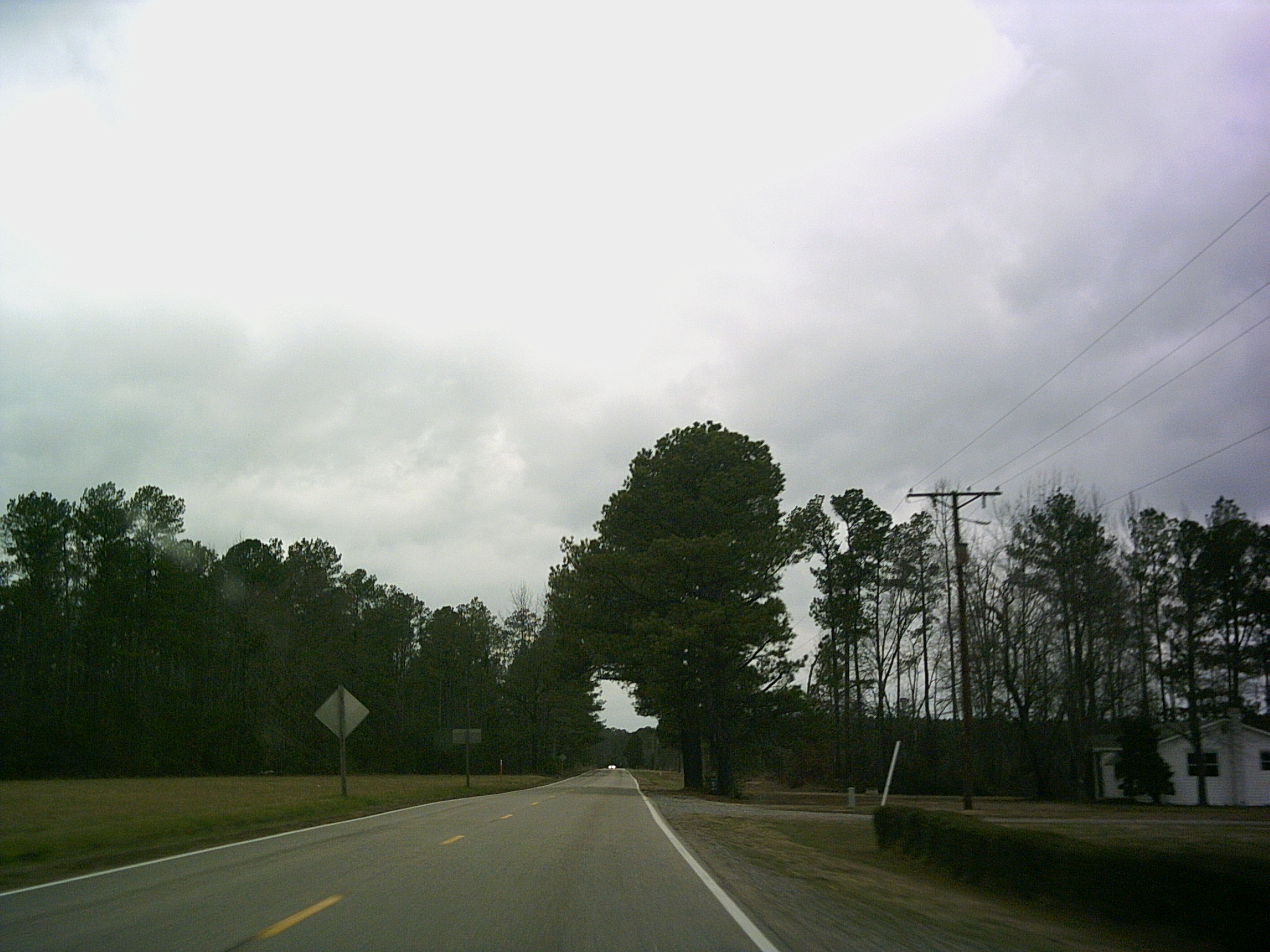
Rural scene along U.S. Route 301 in Prince George County

According to the U.S. Census Bureau, the county has a total area of 282 square miles (730 km^{2}), of which 265 square miles (690 km^{2}) is land and 17 square miles (44 km^{2}) (5.9%) is water. The northwestern corner of the county near the cities of Hopewell and Petersburg, and the location of Fort Gregg-Adams is exurban, but the rest of the county is rural with most land devoted to agriculture and timber production.

=== Adjacent counties / independent cities ===
- Petersburg – independent city, northwest
- Chesterfield County – northwest
- Hopewell – independent city, northwest
- Colonial Heights – independent city, northwest
- Charles City County – north
- Surry County – east
- Sussex County – south
- Dinwiddie County – west

=== National protected areas ===
- James River National Wildlife Refuge
- Petersburg National Battlefield Park (part)

== Economy ==
=== Top employers ===
According to the County's Annual Comprehensive Financial Report for the Year Ended June 30, 2023, the top employers in the county were:

#	Employer	# of Employees
1	United States Department of Defense	1,000+
2	Prince George County Public Schools	500-999
3	Perdue Products / Perdue Farms Inc.	500–999
4	Delhaize America Distribution, LLC / Food Lion Distribution Center	250-499
5	U.S. Department of Justice / National Finance Center	250–499
6	Cunningham Food Services LLC	250–499
7	Standard Motor Products Inc.	250–499
8	County of Prince George	250–499
9	Service Center Metals	250–499
10	U.S. Army Non-Appropriated Funds Division / Fort A.P. Hill	250-499

Goya Foods has its Virginia offices south of the Prince George CDP.

== Government ==
In modern times, there are no centralized cities or towns in the county. Prince George Court House, which uses the postal address Prince George, Virginia, is the focal point of government. The County Administrator answers to the elected Board of Supervisors, who are elected from single-member districts.

=== Politics ===
United States presidential election results for Prince George County, Virginia
Year	Republican		Democratic		Third party(ies)	
Year	No.	%	No.	%	No.	%
1912	42	14.24%	204	69.15%	49	16.61%
1916	72	21.75%	258	77.95%	1	0.30%
1920	127	25.10%	375	74.11%	4	0.79%
1924	90	23.62%	279	73.23%	12	3.15%
1928	235	35.44%	428	64.56%	0	0.00%
1932	115	15.99%	597	83.03%	7	0.97%
1936	128	15.17%	713	84.48%	3	0.36%
1940	156	16.86%	766	82.81%	3	0.32%
1944	301	27.41%	796	72.50%	1	0.09%
1948	317	26.20%	745	61.57%	148	12.23%
1952	541	46.40%	612	52.49%	13	1.11%
1956	689	46.24%	642	43.09%	159	10.67%
1960	727	42.14%	983	56.99%	15	0.87%
1964	1,790	54.32%	1,502	45.58%	3	0.09%
1968	1,559	32.75%	1,272	26.72%	1,930	40.54%
1972	2,405	67.71%	1,084	30.52%	63	1.77%
1976	2,254	45.44%	2,630	53.02%	76	1.53%
1980	3,389	57.56%	2,310	39.23%	189	3.21%
1984	4,999	69.64%	2,136	29.76%	43	0.60%
1988	4,982	66.29%	2,469	32.85%	64	0.85%
1992	4,799	50.99%	3,087	32.80%	1,526	16.21%
1996	5,216	54.86%	3,498	36.79%	793	8.34%
2000	6,579	60.36%	4,182	38.37%	139	1.28%
2004	8,131	61.35%	5,066	38.22%	57	0.43%
2008	8,752	54.68%	7,130	44.55%	124	0.77%
2012	8,879	55.33%	6,991	43.57%	176	1.10%
2016	9,157	56.58%	6,419	39.66%	608	3.76%
2020	10,103	57.96%	7,103	40.75%	226	1.30%
2024	10,590	60.06%	6,842	38.80%	201	1.14%

=== Law enforcement ===
Prince George County is served primarily by the Prince George County Police Department and the Prince George County Sheriff's Office. The police department's responsibility is the enforcement of the laws of the Commonwealth and local ordinances. The primary responsibility of the Sheriff's Office is the security of the courts and service of court (criminal and civil) papers. The Sheriff's Office also assists the police department in the enforcement of the laws of the Commonwealth as a secondary responsibility.

=== Correctional institutions ===
Riverside Regional Jail is located west of 295 and south of the Appomattox River in the county. It serves seven member localities. It is overseen by the Riverside Regional Jail Authority Board.

In addition, the Federal Correctional Institution, Petersburg is located west of the regional jail, closer to the Appomattox River as it curves south. This complex for male inmates, located west of the independent city of Hopewell, Virginia, consists of both a low-security facility, with 1,111 inmates; 293 at the adjacent minimum-security satellite camp; and 1,595 at the associated medium-security facility. All are managed by the Bureau of Prisons (BOP).

== Towns, communities, region ==
There are currently no incorporated towns within Prince George County. Unincorporated towns or communities in the county include:

=== Census-designated places ===
- Disputanta
- Fort Lee (a military base)
- Prince George
- Templeton

=== Other unincorporated communities ===
- Burrowsville
- Carson
- Garysville
- Jordan Point
- Kingwood
- New Bohemia
- Newville

== Transportation ==
Interstate Highways 95 and 295 pass through the county, as does north-south U.S. Route 301 and east-west U.S. Route 460. State Route 10 runs along the southern shore of the James River near several of the James River plantations located in the county. State Route 106 runs through Prince George, the county seat.

Freight railroad service for the county is provided by CSX Transportation, which interchanges with Norfolk Southern at Petersburg. The famous 52-mile long tangent rail line between Petersburg and Suffolk of the former Norfolk and Petersburg Railroad was built by William Mahone in the 1850s, and now forms a vital link of the Norfolk Southern system. A Norfolk Southern Railway automobile transloading facility is located nearby. There are future plans underway for a large Intermodal freight transport railroad-trucking transfer facility in Prince George County as well.

=== Major highways ===
- I-95, the major north-south highway on the Eastern Seaboard, enters Prince George County from Sussex County. Access to the county is available at Exits 37, 41, 45, and 46 before the road enters the City of Petersburg.
- I-295 is the north-south bypass around Petersburg and Richmond, further north. Besides its southern terminus at Exit 46 on I-95, access to the county is available at Exits 3A and 3B before the road enters the City of Hopewell.
- US 301, the principal south-north route Sussex County until it was supplanted by I-95. A spur of US Route 1, it enters Prince George County from Sussex County and serves as a frontage road along I-95, until reaching Carson, where it moves further away from the interstate. However, it does cross over I-95 at exit 41 along with an overlap of VA 35 (see below), and again at Exit 45 eventually entering Petersburg.
- US 460, a major west-to-east corridor that runs southeasterly in the south-central of Prince George County, as a connecting route between the Central Appalachian Mountains and the Hampton Roads area. A spur of US 60, it enters the county from Petersburg entering New Bohemia, then later runs through Disputanta before leaving the county at the Sussex County line northwest of Waverly.
- SR 10, is a state route that runs west to east along the south side of the James River. Named James River Drive throughout the county, it enters the county from Hopewell at the bridges over the Bailey Creek, and briefly takes an overlap of VA 106/156 between Ruffin Road and Jordan Point Road. From there it passes south of the privately owned Henshaw Airport near Garysville, then passes through Burrowsville, and after the intersection with Chippokes Road (VSR 610), crosses the Prince George-Surry County Line.
- SR 35, a south-north state road that enters the county from rural areas north of Disputanta. The route runs mainly southeast to northwest along Courtland Street from the Sussex-Prince George County Line and terminates at a pair of Virginia Secondary Routes northwest of the US 301/VA 35 overlap in Templeton. Both VA 35 and US 301 were part of the historic Jerusalem Plank Road, which was the site of a Civil War Battle in Petersburg.
- SR 106 runs northeast from Petersburg as Courthouse Road, through Prince George, where it runs under I-295 with no interchange. It then encounters VA 156 (see below) which joins VA 106 in an overlap towards the Benjamin Harrison Memorial Bridge.
- SR 156 runs northeast from Templeton at the southeast end of the US 301/VA 35 overlap. It passes through Disputanta, then joins VA 106 in an overlap east of Prince George where it too heads towards the Benjamin Harrison Memorial Bridge.

== Demographics ==
Historical population
Census	Pop.	Note	%±
1790	8,173		—
1800	7,425		−9.2%
1810	8,050		8.4%
1820	8,030		−0.2%
1830	8,367		4.2%
1840	7,175		−14.2%
1850	7,596		5.9%
1860	8,411		10.7%
1870	7,820		−7.0%
1880	10,054		28.6%
1890	7,872		−21.7%
1900	7,752		−1.5%
1910	7,848		1.2%
1920	12,915		64.6%
1930	10,311		−20.2%
1940	12,226		18.6%
1950	19,679		61.0%
1960	20,270		3.0%
1970	29,092		43.5%
1980	25,733		−11.5%
1990	27,394		6.5%
2000	33,047		20.6%
2010	35,725		8.1%
2020	43,010		20.4%
2025 (est.)	43,936	▲	2.2%
U.S. Decennial Census; 1790–1960 1900–1990; 1990–2000 2010–2020

=== Racial and ethnic composition ===
Prince George County, Virginia – Racial and ethnic composition Note: the US Census treats Hispanic/Latino as an ethnic category. This table excludes Latinos from the racial categories and assigns them to a separate category. Hispanics/Latinos may be of any race.
Race / Ethnicity (NH = Non-Hispanic)	Pop 1980	Pop 1990	Pop 2000	Pop 2010	Pop 2020	% 1980	% 1990	% 2000	% 2010	% 2020
White alone (NH)	16,697	17,808	19,532	20,822	22,662	64.89%	65.01%	59.10%	58.28%	52.69%
Black or African American alone (NH)	7,355	7,832	10,593	11,150	12,694	28.58%	28.59%	32.05%	31.21%	29.51%
Native American or Alaska Native alone (NH)	76	94	124	184	221	0.30%	0.34%	0.38%	0.52%	0.51%
Asian alone (NH)	484	569	556	520	822	1.88%	2.08%	1.68%	1.46%	1.91%
Native Hawaiian or Pacific Islander alone (NH)	x	x	48	100	141	x	x	0.15%	0.28%	0.33%
Other race alone (NH)	191	31	61	61	191	0.74%	0.11%	0.18%	0.17%	0.44%
Mixed race or Multiracial (NH)	x	x	508	830	1,935	x	x	1.54%	2.32%	4.50%
Hispanic or Latino (any race)	930	1,060	1,625	2,058	4,344	3.61%	3.87%	4.92%	5.76%	10.10%
Total	25,733	27,394	33,047	35,725	43,010	100.00%	100.00%	100.00%	100.00%	100.00%

=== 2020 census ===
As of the 2020 census, the county had a population of 43,010. The median age was 34.2 years. 19.7% of residents were under the age of 18 and 13.0% of residents were 65 years of age or older. For every 100 females there were 126.9 males, and for every 100 females age 18 and over there were 134.2 males age 18 and over.

The racial makeup of the county was 55.4% White, 30.2% Black or African American, 0.6% American Indian and Alaska Native, 2.0% Asian, 0.3% Native Hawaiian and Pacific Islander, 4.4% from some other race, and 7.1% from two or more races. Hispanic or Latino residents of any race comprised 10.1% of the population.

50.9% of residents lived in urban areas, while 49.1% lived in rural areas.

There were 12,579 households in the county, of which 36.1% had children under the age of 18 living with them and 24.5% had a female householder with no spouse or partner present. About 20.5% of all households were made up of individuals and 9.1% had someone living alone who was 65 years of age or older.

There were 13,378 housing units, of which 6.0% were vacant. Among occupied housing units, 69.5% were owner-occupied and 30.5% were renter-occupied. The homeowner vacancy rate was 1.4% and the rental vacancy rate was 6.4%.

=== 2010 Census ===
As of the census of 2010, there were 35,725 people, 10,159 households, and 8,096 families residing in the county. The population density was 124 people per square mile (48 people/km^{2}). There were 10,726 housing units at an average density of 40 units per square mile (15 units/km^{2}). The racial makeup of the county was 60.93% White, 32.54% Black or African American, 0.42% Native American, 1.73% Asian, 0.15% Pacific Islander, 2.19% from other races, and 2.03% from two or more races. 4.92% of the population were Hispanic or Latino of any race. According to the U.S. Census Bureau, on July 1, 2019, it is estimated that there is a population of 38,353 people living in Prince George County.

There were 10,159 households, out of which 41.90% had children under the age of 18 living with them, 63.50% were married couples living together, 12.20% had a female householder with no husband present, and 20.30% were non-families. 17.20% of all households were made up of individuals, and 5.80% had someone living alone who was 65 years of age or older. The average household size was 2.76 and the average family size was 3.11.

In the county, the population was spread out, with 25.10% under the age of 18, 13.60% from 18 to 24, 33.30% from 25 to 44, 20.80% from 45 to 64, and 7.30% who were 65 years of age or older. The median age was 32 years. For every 100 females, there were 117.00 males. For every 100 females age 18 and over, there were 120.90 males.

The median income for a household in the county was $49,877, and the median income for a family was $53,750. Males had a median income of $37,363 versus $26,347 for females. The per capita income for the county was $20,196. About 6.50% of families and 8.00% of the population were below the poverty line, including 11.40% of those under age 18 and 8.30% of those age 65 or over.

== Education ==
=== Colleges and Universities ===
- Richard Bland College

=== K-12 education ===
The school division is the Prince George County Public Schools school district.

Secondary schools

- Prince George High School 10–12
- N.B. Clements Jr. High 8–9
- J.E.J Moore Middle School 6–7

Elementary schools

- D. A. Harrison Elementary School K–5
- L.L. Beazley Elementary School K-5
- Middle Road Elementary School K-5
- North Elementary School K-5
- South Elementary School K-5

== Notable people ==
- Richard Bland – planter and statesman, member of the Virginia House of Burgesses.
- Richard Bland II – Planter and statesman, member of the Virginia House of Burgesses, and delegate to the Continental Congress.
- Theodorick Bland of Cawsons – Planter and statesman, member of the Virginia House of Burgesses.
- Theodorick Bland – Physician, revolutionary soldier, and statesman who became a major figure in the formation of the new United States Government, representing Virginia in both the Continental Congress and the United States House of Representatives.
- Colonel Robert Bolling – Planter and merchant who resided at Kippax Plantation.
- Jane Rolfe Bolling – Wife of Colonel Robert Bolling, granddaughter of Pocahontas and English colonist John Rolfe
- Jackie Bradley Jr. – Major League Baseball player, attended Prince George High School.
- Larry Brooks – National Football League player, graduated from Prince George High School
- Robert Williams Daniel – Banker who survived the sinking of the RMS Titanic and later served in the Virginia Senate; resided at Brandon Plantation.
- Margery Durant Daniel – Second wife of Robert Williams Daniel, daughter of Billy Durant, a businessman and founder of General Motors
- Robert Williams Daniel Jr. – Member of the US House of Representatives; served five terms representing Virginia's 4th congressional district.
- Richard Eppes – Planter and surgeon in the Confederate States Army during the American Civil War; resided at Appomattox Manor.
- Rick Gates – Political consultant, lobbyist, and business associate of Trump campaign manager Paul Manafort graduated from Prince George High School.
- Elmon T. Gray – Waverly businessman and son of Garland Gray; served in the Virginia Senate from 1971 to 1992.
- Samuel Jordan – Jamestown colonist and one of the first colonial legislators; established Jordan's Point Plantation
- John Martin – Jamestown colonist who established Martin's Brandon Plantation
- Johnny Oates – Major League Baseball player, coach, and manager, graduated from Prince George High School.
- Edmund Ruffin – Planter, agronomist, and southern secessionist; born at Evergreen Plantation in Prince George.
- Reggie Williams – NBA player; graduated from Prince George High School.
- George Yeardley – Jamestown colonist who established Flowerdew Hundred Plantation

== See also ==
- National Register of Historic Places listings in Prince George County, Virginia
- Prince George County Sheriff's Office
- Prince George County Police Department
