= William Beverley =

American legislator, civil servant, planter and landowner (1696–1756)

Member of the House of Burgesses from Orange County
- In office 1736–1738 Serving with Robert Green
- Preceded by: Position established
- Succeeded by: Robert Green

Member of the House of Burgesses from Essex County
- In office 1742–1749 Serving with James Garnett (1742–1747); William Daingerfield (1748–1749)
- Preceded by: Salvator Muscoe; Thomas Waring
- Succeeded by: Francis Smith; Thomas Waring

Clerk of Court for Essex County
- In office 1716–1745
- Preceded by: None
- Succeeded by: John Lee

Personal details
- Born: 1696 Virginia
- Died: 1756 (aged 59–60) Virginia
- Spouse: Elizabeth Bland
- Relations: Robert Beverley, Jr. (father); Ursula Byrd Beverley (mother); Peter Beverley (uncle); William Byrd II (uncle); William Byrd I (grandfather); James Boyd, 9th Lord Boyd (great-grandfather); Richard Bland (father-in-law); Richard Bland (brother-in-law)
- Children: John Beverley b. 1727 d. 1743 in England: Robert Beverley; Elizabeth Beverley Mills; Ursula Beverley Fitzhugh; Anna Beverley
- Occupation: Legislator; civil servant; planter; landowner

William Beverley (1696–1756) was an 18th-century legislator, civil servant, planter and landowner in the Colony of Virginia. Born in Virginia, Beverley—the son of planter and historian Robert Beverley, Jr. (c. 1667–1722) and his wife, Ursula Byrd Beverley (1681–1698)—was the scion of two prominent Virginia families. He was the nephew of Peter Beverley (1668–1728), Speaker of the Virginia House of Burgesses, and the grandson of wealthy Virginia planter William Byrd I (1652–1704) of Westover Plantation. Beverley's mother died shortly before her 17th birthday (when he was a toddler), and he was sent to England.

After his education in England he began a career in public service as the Clerk of Court for Essex County (1716–1745) and in the Virginia House of Burgesses, representing Orange (1736–1738) and Essex Counties (1742–1749). Beverley also served on the Virginia Governor's Council in 1750.

He inherited a large estate after his father's death in 1722, amassing significant landholdings throughout Virginia from which he received revenue from tobacco production and rent from 119 tenants. His development of the 118,941-acre (481.34 km^{2}) Beverley Manor tract in present-day Augusta County encouraged further settlement west of the Blue Ridge Mountains. Beverley was commissioned by Thomas Fairfax, 6th Lord Fairfax of Cameron, for an expedition with Peter Jefferson to establish the Fairfax Line of the Northern Neck Proprietary.

== Early life and education ==
Beverley was born in 1696, the only child of Robert Beverley, Jr. (c. 1667–1722) and his wife, Ursula Byrd Beverley (1681–1698). Robert Beverley, Jr., of the Beverley Park plantation in King and Queen County, was a wealthy planter who participated in the Knights of the Golden Horseshoe Expedition and was the first native-born historian of colonial Virginia; he wrote the History of the Present State of Virginia in 1705, the first known history of Virginia. William Beverley's uncle, Peter (1668–1728), was Speaker of the Virginia House of Burgesses. His mother, Ursula, the daughter of William Byrd I (1652–1704) and Maria Horsmanden Byrd of Westover Plantation, was affectionately known as "Little Nutty" by her family. She died on October 31, 1698, shortly before her 17th birthday, and was buried in Jamestown. Through his paternal grandmother, Margaret Boyd Beverley, William Beverley was a great-grandson of Scottish noble James Boyd, 9th Lord Boyd (died 1654). After his mother's death Beverley was sent to England, where he was educated.

== Political career ==
After his education was completed, Beverley returned to Virginia and began a career in public service. He was the Clerk of Court for Essex County for 29 years (1716–1745), when the first Essex County courthouse was on Beverley's Blandfield estate. Beverley was also an Essex County judge from 1720 to 1740. He was a member of the Virginia House of Burgesses in Williamsburg, elected to represent Orange (1736–1738) and Essex Counties (1742–1749). During his first term as Orange County burgess, Beverley served with Robert Green. He represented Essex County with James Ganett until 1747, after which he served with William Daingerfield until 1749. Beverley's appointment as county lieutenant and commander-in-chief of the militias of Augusta and Orange Counties in 1741 was confirmed in the Orange County Court on November 3, 1741. In 1750 he was appointed to the Virginia Governor's Council, the upper house of Virginia's colonial legislature, replacing John Custis IV (father-in-law of Martha Dandridge Custis). Beverley's appointment to the Governor's Council fulfilled an ambition which his father was unable to achieve.

== Agricultural pursuits and landholdings ==
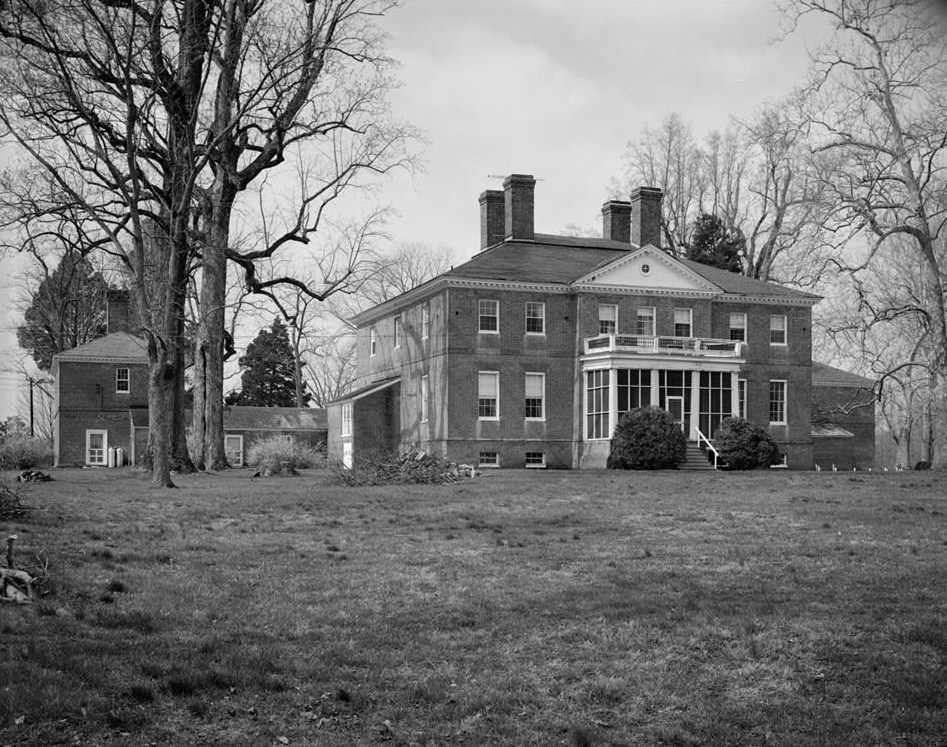
Beverley's son, Robert, built the mansion at Blandfield between 1769 and 1773. The property was owned by the Beverley family from 1683 until its 1983 sale.

Beverley inherited a large estate after his father's death in 1722, and continued speculating in land. He received income from tobacco production and rent from tenant farmers. Although by 1745 Beverley's estate produced 57 hogsheads (about 26,000 kg) of tobacco, the income from his 119 tenants in Caroline, Culpeper, Orange and King and Queen Counties was far more lucrative.

After his marriage to Elizabeth Bland about 1725 Beverley lived at Blandfield, a 3,450-acre (14.0 km^{2}) estate along the Rappahannock River in Saint Anne's Parish of Essex County which he named for his wife's family. Blandfield was granted by patent to his grandfather, Robert Beverley, Sr., in 1683 as part of a 100,000-acre (400 km^{2}) tract. Construction of Beverley's first, Georgian-style mansion at Blandfield (which is no longer standing) probably began around 1750. Blandfield had wharves on the Rappahannock from which the plantation's tobacco was shipped across the Atlantic.

In addition to agriculture and land tenancy, Beverley received additional revenue from land sales in western Virginia. The easing of restrictive land laws by the Virginia colonial government allowed him to establish his own terms with settlers on his lands, and he initially sold parcels in the Shenandoah Valley. On September 6, 1736, Beverley, John and Richard Randolph and John Robinson were deeded a land patent by Sir William Gooch, 1st Baronet on behalf of the crown for a 118,941-acre (481.34 km^{2}) tract at the headwaters of the South Fork Shenandoah River in present-day Augusta County. On September 16 the Randolphs and Robinson transferred sole ownership of the tract to Beverley, who planned to survey and sell it; the tract, which became known as Beverley Manor, encouraged further settlement west of the Blue Ridge Mountains. He commissioned James Patton, a ship captain from County Donegal, to recruit Irish and Scotch-Irish immigrants to purchase and settle his Augusta County land. On August 8, 1737, Beverley wrote to Patton, "I should be very glad if you could import families enough to take the whole off from our hands at a reasonable price and tho' the order mentions families from Pensilvania [sic], yet families from Ireland will do as well". In 1738 he authorized John Lewis of northern Ireland, the father of Thomas Lewis, to show and sell his land in Augusta County and donated a lot in Staunton for the construction of the Augusta County Courthouse ten years later.

By 1743 Beverley wished to receive a land grant of 20,000 acres (81 km^{2}) in the Northern Neck Proprietary on the Shenandoah and the South Branch Potomac rivers from Thomas Fairfax, 6th Lord Fairfax of Cameron, planning to raise horses and cattle and divide the Northern Neck land for tenants. He and others, including John Robinson and his father (also named John), purchased 100,000 acres (400 km^{2}) on the Greenbrier River in 1745 for speculation and settlement. Beverley's land sales totaled 42,119 acres (170.45 km^{2}) by 1744, and by his death in 1756 he had sold 80,455 acres (325.59 km^{2}) and made a profit of £2,647.

According to his 1756 will, Beverley owned land in Essex, Isle of Wight, King and Queen and Prince William Counties; 14,174 acres (57.36 km^{2}) in Caroline County, including the Pewmazeno and Beverley Chace properties and land lots in Port Royal; a land tract of 4,000 acres (16 km^{2}), known as Elkwood, in Culpeper County, and lots in the towns of Falmouth and Fredericksburg. According to historian Turk McCleskey, the land grants to Beverley from the Governor's Council on behalf of the crown "reflected the Council's recognition both of his elite connections and of his demonstrated leadership abilities".

== Business pursuits ==
Beverley owned and operated a tavern at Caroline Court House in Caroline County, and participated in trade with the West Indies. He wrote to a Barbadian merchant in 1739, "I am very conveniently situated for the sale of Negroes, rum, sugar & Mollasses [sic]". Beverley sold Barbadian salt in Virginia and shipped Virginia maize to Barbados. A partial inventory of his estate in 1745 listed 65 enslaved persons on four plantations, cattle, hogs, sheep and horses. In 1763 Beverley's son, Robert, reported that his father's estate earned "about £1800 Currency, all plantation expenses deducted".

== Fairfax Line expedition ==
In 1746 Beverley was commissioned by Thomas Fairfax, 6th Lord Fairfax of Cameron, to represent him in an expedition with Peter Jefferson (father of Thomas Jefferson) through western Virginia to mark the Fairfax Line of the Northern Neck Proprietary, supervising the work of Jefferson and the other surveyors. The following year, he and the other participants in the Fairfax Line expedition reconvened at Jefferson's Tuckahoe plantation to draft a map (which became known as the Fry-Jefferson Map) of the Northern Neck Proprietary.

== Personal life and family ==
Beverley's coat of arms

Coat of Arms of William Beverley

Beverley married Elizabeth Bland (born May 26, 1706) around 1725. Elizabeth was the daughter of Richard Bland and Elizabeth Randolph Bland of Jordan's Point, and the sister of statesman Richard Bland. Beverley and his wife had four children: one son and three daughters—Robert Beverley (1740–1800), Elizabeth Beverley Mills, Ursula Beverley Fitzhugh and Anna Beverley. Beverley took an active role in his children's education, traveling to England in 1750 to enroll his son, his nephew Robert Munford III and another young man at Wakefield Grammar School.

Three of Beverley's children married into prominent Virginia families. Robert married Maria Carter, daughter of Landon Carter and Maria Byrd Carter of Sabine Hall, Richmond County. Elizabeth married James Mills, a merchant in Hobbs Hole, and Ursula married William Fitzhugh. Anna was unmarried at Beverley's death in 1756.

Beverley, an Anglican, had a close relationship with Anglican minister and parson Robert Rose of Saint Anne's Parish. Blandfield was in the parish, and his family attended Anglican (and later Episcopal) services at a church near the estate. On April 3, 1750 Beverley provided a lot in Staunton for the Anglican Augusta Parish Church, which was completed in 1763 and succeeded by the present Trinity Episcopal Church.

== Death and legacy ==
After Beverley's death in 1756, his son Robert was his designated heir at law. His wife Elizabeth inherited his plantations in Essex County, including the Blandfield estate and his "slaves, cattle, horses, hogs, and sheep" on the plantations. Beverley divided a large part of his fortune among his children and their spouses, bequeathing £500 to his daughter Elizabeth and leaving her husband, James Mills, "Money & slaves" valued at £1,000. Ursula also received £500 and her husband, William Fitzhugh, £1,000. Anna was unmarried at the time of Beverley's death; his will instructed Robert to maintain his sister until her marriage or her twenty-first birthday, when she would receive her inheritance. Robert inherited the remainder of the plantations and other lands, including the Beverley Manor tract in Augusta County and lots in the town of Staunton. Beverley Manor, an Augusta County magisterial district south of Staunton, is a namesake of the Beverley Manor patent. After his mother's death Robert also inherited Beverley's Essex County properties, including Blandfield (where he built the present Georgian mansion on the site of his father's residence between 1769 and 1773). Blandfield was owned by Beverley's descendants until its 1983 sale.

== Bibliography ==
- Bain, Robert; Flora, Joseph M.; Rubin, Louis Decimus, eds. (1979). Southern Writers: A Biographical Dictionary. Baton Rouge, Louisiana: Louisiana State University Press. ISBN 978-0-8071-0390-6. OCLC 4492764 – via Internet Archive.
- Beverley, William (January 1928). "Diary of William Beverley of "Blandfield" during a Visit to England, 1750". The Virginia Magazine of History and Biography. 36 (1). Richmond, Virginia: Virginia Historical Society: 27–35. JSTOR 4244181.
- Beverley, William (July 1914). "Will of William Beverley, 1756". The Virginia Magazine of History and Biography. 22 (3). Richmond, Virginia: Virginia Historical Society: 297–301. JSTOR 4243366.
- Byrd, William (October 1916). "Letters of William Byrd, First (Continued)". The Virginia Magazine of History and Biography. 24 (4). Richmond, Virginia: Virginia Historical Society: 350–360. JSTOR 4243546.
- Evans, Emory G. (2009). A "Topping People": The Rise and Decline of Virginia's Old Political Elite, 1680–1790. Charlottesville, Virginia: University of Virginia Press. ISBN 978-0-8139-3037-4. OCLC 263497804. Archived from the original on 2016-04-21 – via Google Books.
- Glanville, Jim; Mays, Ryan (November 2010). "William Beverley, James Patton, and the Settling of the Shenandoah Valley" (PDF). Essex County Museum and Historical Society Bulletin. 55. Tappahannock, Virginia: Essex County Museum and Historical Society: 1–5. Archived from the original (PDF) on June 3, 2011.
- Gordon-Reed, Annette (1998). Thomas Jefferson and Sally Hemings: An American Controversy. Charlottesville, Virginia: University of Virginia Press. ISBN 978-0-8139-3356-6. OCLC 35192332. Archived from the original on 2015-03-17 – via Google Books.
- Gwathmey, John Hastings (1979). Twelve Virginia Counties: Where the Western Migration Began. Baltimore: Genealogical Publishing Company, Inc. ISBN 978-0-8063-0861-6. OCLC 5777452 – via Internet Archive.
- Hunter, Joseph (1895). John William Clay (ed.). Familiae Minorum Gentium, Volume II. London: Harleian Society. OCLC 61398975. Archived from the original on 2016-04-17 – via Google Books.
- McCleskey, Turk (July 1990). "Rich Land, Poor Prospects: Real Estate and the Formation of a Social Elite in Augusta County, Virginia, 1738–1770". The Virginia Magazine of History and Biography. 98 (3). Richmond, Virginia: Virginia Historical Society: 449–486. JSTOR 4249164.
- Mulkearn, Lois, ed. (1954). George Mercer Papers: Relating to the Ohio Company of Virginia. Pittsburgh: University of Pittsburgh Press. ISBN 978-0-8229-7536-6. OCLC 772510698. Archived from the original on 2016-04-04 – via Google Books.
- Nelson, John Kendall (2003). Blessed Company: Parishes, Parsons, and Parishioners in Anglican Virginia, 1690-1776: Parishes, Parsons, and Parishioners in Anglican Virginia, 1690-1776. Chapel Hill, North Carolina: University of North Carolina Press. ISBN 9780807875100. OCLC 52183660. Archived from the original on 2016-04-16 – via Google Books.
- Osborn, Richard (2007). "William Preston: Origins of a Backcountry Political Career". Journal of Backcountry Studies. Greensboro, North Carolina: University of North Carolina at Greensboro. Archived from the original on March 4, 2016.
- Southern Churchman Company (1908). Colonial Churches in the Original Colony of Virginia: A Series of Sketches by Especially Qualified Writers. Richmond, Virginia: Southern Churchman Company. OCLC 1397138. Archived from the original on 2016-04-14 – via Google Books.
- Stanard, W. G. (January 1896). "Major Robert Beverley and His Descendants (Continued)". The Virginia Magazine of History and Biography. 3 (3). Richmond, Virginia: Virginia Historical Society: 261–271. JSTOR 4241889.
- Virginia Historic Landmarks Commission (1969). National Register of Historic Places Registration Form: Blandfield (PDF). United States Department of the Interior, National Park Service. Archived from the original (PDF) on October 6, 2015.
- Virginia Historic Landmarks Commission (January 1972). National Register of Historic Places Registration Form: Trinity Episcopal Church (PDF). United States Department of the Interior, National Park Service. Archived from the original (PDF) on October 6, 2015.
- Virginia Historical Society (October 1928). "Robert Beverley, the Historian of Virginia". The Virginia Magazine of History and Biography. 36 (4). Richmond, Virginia: Virginia Historical Society: 333–344. JSTOR 4244228.
- Waddell, Jos. A. (January 1901). "Militia Companies in Augusta County, in 1742". The Virginia Magazine of History and Biography. 8 (3). Richmond, Virginia: Virginia Historical Society: 278–283. JSTOR 4242356.
- William and Mary Quarterly (2006). Genealogies of Virginia Families from the William and Mary College Quarterly. Baltimore: Clearfield Company, Inc., by Genealogical Publishing Company, Inc. ISBN 978-0-8063-0955-2. OCLC 79476264. Archived from the original on 2016-04-06 – via Google Books.
- Wise, Jennings Cropper (1918). Col. John Wise of England and Virginia (1617–1695): His Ancestors and Descendants. Richmond, Virginia: Bell Books and Stationery Company. OCLC 5094827 – via Internet Archive.

Court offices
Preceded by None	Clerk of Court for Essex County; 1716–1745	Succeeded by John Lee
Virginia House of Delegates
Preceded by Position established	Member of the House of Burgesses from Orange County; 1736–1738; Served alongside: Robert Green	Succeeded by Robert Green
Preceded by Salvator Muscoe; Thomas Waring	Member of the House of Burgesses from Essex County; 1742–1749; Served alongside: James Garnett (1742–1747); William Daingerfield (1748–1749)	Succeeded by Francis Smith; Thomas Waring
