= New Bohemia, Virginia =

Unincorporated community in Virginia, US

- Unincorporated community
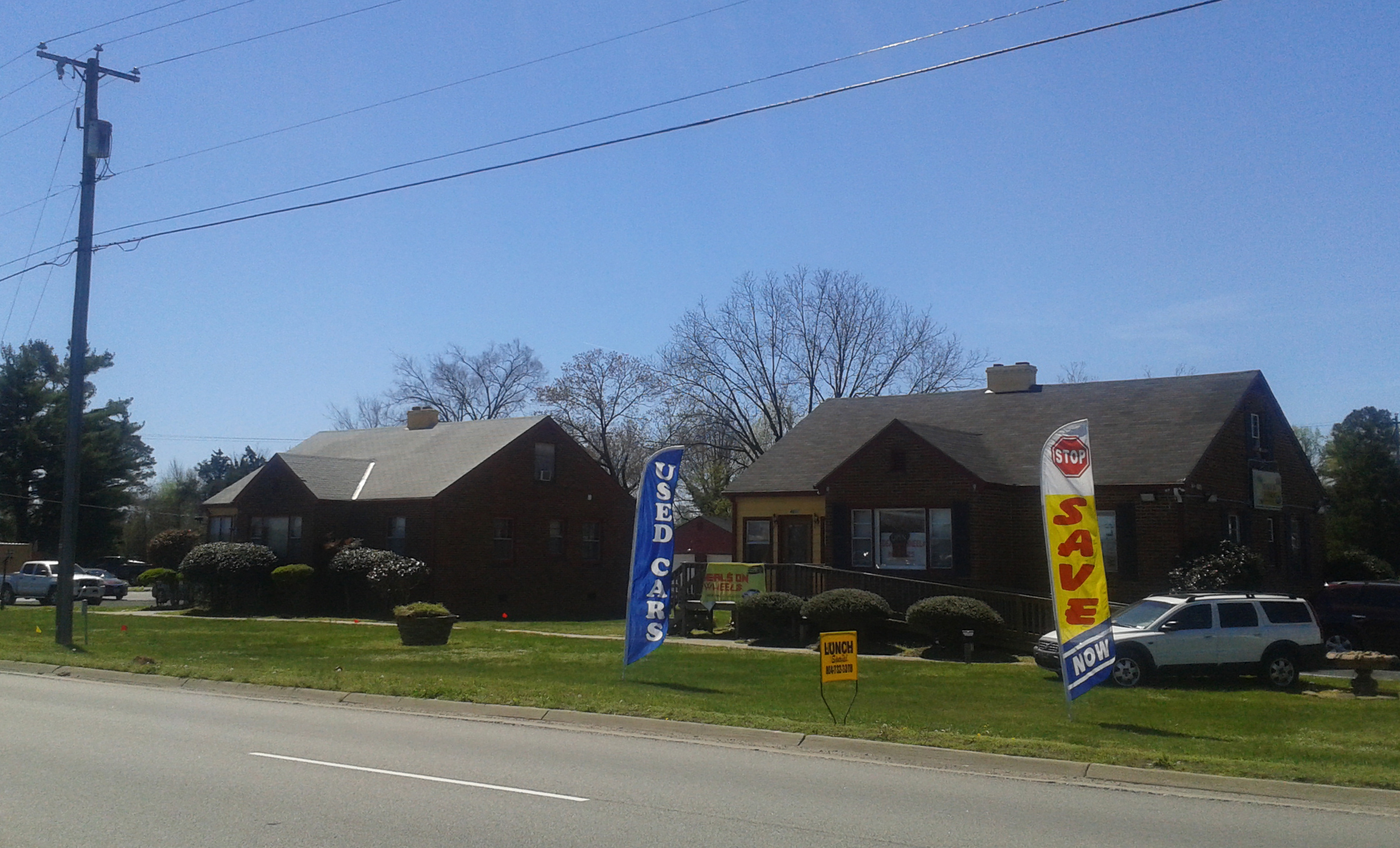
- New Bohemia, Virginia
- Interactive map of New Bohemia, Virginia
- Coordinates: 37°11′02″N 77°19′13″W
- Country: United States
- State: Virginia
- County: Prince George
- Time zone: UTC−5 (Eastern)
  - Summer (DST): UTC−4 (EDT)

New Bohemia is an unincorporated community in Prince George County, Virginia, United States, along U.S. Route 460. It was also once known as Wells or Wells Station.

New Bohemia was established early in the 20th century by a group of Bohemian and Slovak immigrants who had previously settled in the industrial and mining sections of western Pennsylvania and eastern Ohio. In the late 19th century, over 700 Czech and Slovak families settled Prince George and neighboring counties. They had been farmers in Europe and relocated to the area due to the availability of cheap farmland. Their success in rehabilitating worn-out farms, where production had almost vanished under monoculture tobacco production, and producing new crops such as peanuts, led to the immigration of other Bohemians and Slovaks, with a sprinkling of Germans, Austrians, Poles, Russians, and Lithuanians, many of whom came directly from their homelands. Some Bohemian and Slovak families who had homesteaded in the Midwest also moved back east and bought farms in Prince George. Historically, there was a strong connection between the Czech and Slovak communities in Baltimore and the Czech and Slovak communities in Prince George County. The members of the two communities would often travel back and forth between Baltimore and Prince George County in order to cooperate on events.

In the late 1980s, Interstate 295 was built through the area, which brought commercial development to the previously rural community. Several farms were taken to construct the highway and a cloverleaf interchange at Interstate 295 and U.S. Route 460. Due to its location along the Norfolk Southern Railway at the junction of Interstate 295 and U.S. Route 460, and, given its proximity to the junction of Interstates 85 and 95, much of the remaining farmland and timberland around New Bohemia has since been sold for commercial development, including a large truck stop, and intermodal freight transport facilities. Several large tracts of land including a parcel previously used as a drop zone by the U.S. Army at nearby Fort Lee were acquired in the early 21st century by Prince George County for the development of an Industrial Park.
