= Westover Church =

Historic church in Virginia, US

- U.S. National Register of Historic Places
- Virginia Landmarks Register
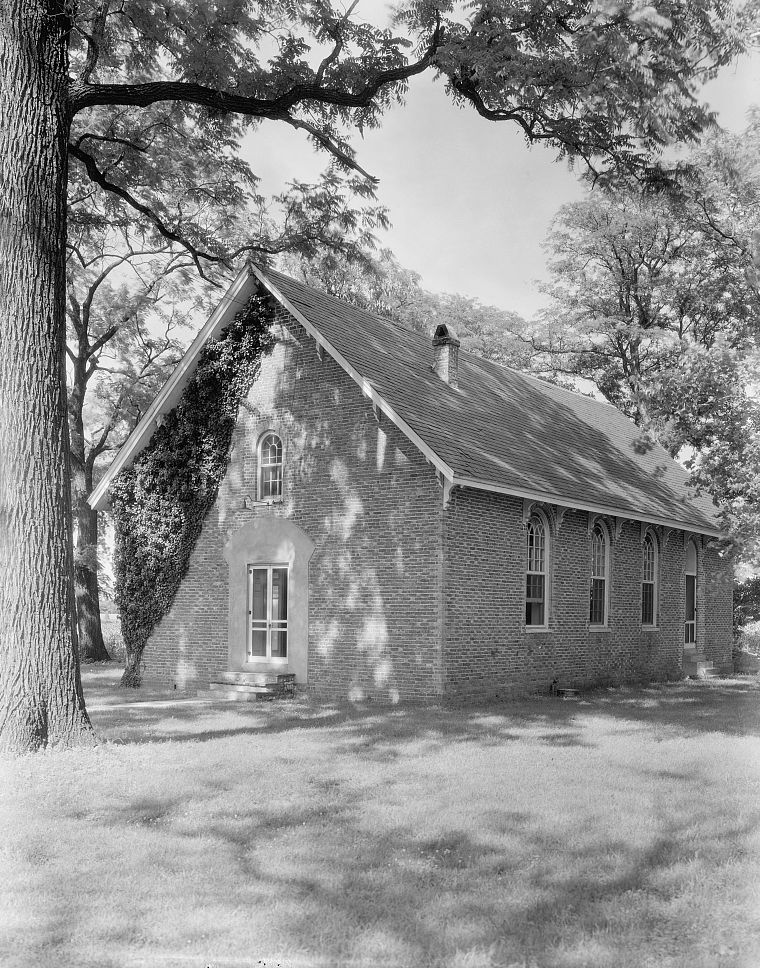
- Westover Church, 1930, by Frances Benjamin Johnston

- Location within Virginia Location within the United States
- Location: 5 mi. W of Charles City off VA 5, Charles City County, Virginia
- Coordinates: 37°19′56″N 77°9′33″W
- Area: 40 acres (16 ha)
- Built: 1731
- NRHP reference No.: 72001502
- VLR No.: 018-0028

Significant dates
- Added to NRHP: December 05, 1972
- Designated VLR: August 15, 1972

Westover Church is a historic church located 5 miles (8.0 km) west of Charles City off Virginia State Route 5 in Charles City County, Virginia, United States. It was built in 1731 and added to the National Register of Historic Places in 1972.

Theodorick Bland of Westover, Walter Aston, and William Byrd I are buried near the original site of the Westover Church. The tomb of Benjamin Harrison IV has also been reported to be on the grounds.

== History ==
Between 1611 and 1613, as the colonists moved west from Jamestown, several small parishes were formed, Weyanoke, Wallingford, and Wilmington, among others. These parishes later merged and became Westover Parish in 1625 . In 1724 Westover Parish became and remains coterminous with Charles City County.

The predecessor of the existing Westover Church was constructed between 1630 and 1637 on the grounds at Westover. The present sanctuary was completed circa 1730 at its present site on Herring Creek about 1 ½ miles north of the Westover mansion.

The ending of support by public taxation for the Church at the start of the American Revolution in 1776, followed by the disestablishment of the Church of England in America in 1784 resulted in a period of decline. Westover Church was finally abandoned in 1803, and later even used as a barn for a period, during the three decades that services of the Protestant Episcopal Church of Virginia lapsed completely in Charles City County.

However, in about 1833 religious services were revived by a missionary to the county, the Reverend Parke Farley Berkeley. At this time the Church structure was repaired and restored, principally through the efforts of the Harrison family of nearby Berkley Plantation and the Carters of Shirley Plantation a few miles west.

During the American Civil War the church was badly damaged by Federal troops, who used the church as a stable for their horses. Following the war, services were restored in 1867 and Westover Church has been used faithfully ever since.

Worshipers at Westover have included farmers, plantation owners, slaves, as well as US Presidents George Washington, Thomas Jefferson, William Henry Harrison, John Tyler, and Theodore Roosevelt.
