= Edward Bland (explorer) =

- Born: England
- Died: late 1652; Chippokes plantation, Surry County, Virginia
- Occupations: Merchant, explorer, writer
- Notable work: The Discovery of New Brittaine
- Spouse: Jane Bland
- Children: Edward Bland Jr.
- Parent(s): John Bland; Susan Bland
- Relatives: Theodorick Bland of Westover (brother); John Bland II (brother); Giles Bland (nephew)

Edward Bland (died ca. 1653) was an English explorer and merchant.

Coat of Arms of Edward Bland

== Early and family life ==
Bland was born in England to the wife of John Bland, a London merchant and investor in the Virginia Company. His mother was named either Mary, or Susan. He was baptized on February 5, 1614 in the Saint Stephen Coleman Street parish. He had several brothers and sisters, of whom John Bland II, Theodorick Bland and Adam Bland also emigrated to Jamestown, where they became merchants, trading Virginia tobacco and other goods for items essential for the colony's well-being as well as luxury goods.

== Personal life ==
Around 1634 Bland married his cousin Jane Bland, the daughter of his uncle, Gregory Bland. They had one child together, Edward.

== Career ==
His father sent him to Virginia in about 1646, following the death of their younger brother Adam, to help his older brother, John, to look after the family's land and mercantile interests there. Adam Bland had a plantation known as Kimoges in Charles City County and also owned a lot at Jamestown. Once in Virginia, Edward Bland began to acquire more land, including a 3,000 acre plantation on the south side of the James River known as Chippokes which he purchased from Thomas Hill of Jamestown. By 1652, when he was named his late father's administrator in Virginia, Edward Bland owned a substantial amount on both sides of the James River.

During the summer of 1650 Bland accompanied Abraham Wood, Sackford Brewster, Elias Pennant, and an Appamattoc guide named Pyancha on an expedition of lands to the south of Virginia. The group hoped to travel up the Roanoke River and surpass the terrain explored by Ralph Lane, but were unsuccessful. Bland kept a record of the journey, which marked the first time that the Occaneechi tribe was mentioned in the English historical record. He also kept notes of the land, vegetation, and other landmarks. The group is believed to have traveled as far as Roanoke Rapids, North Carolina, an area that Bland dubbed "New Brittaine". Upon his return he published a pamphlet entitled The Discovery of New Brittaine and successfully petitioned the General Assembly to colonize the area.

== Death and legacy ==
Bland died around 1653, likely in his home. However, he died within months of that appointment, as well as his marriage, and his widow repatented the land, then married John Holmwood. His brother Theodorick then travelled to Virginia to assume control of the family's interests, and became politically powerful. Not long after Theodorick's death more than a decade after that of this man, their nephew Giles Bland (son of John Bland II) also emigrated to Virginia, where he acted as his father's attorney in collecting debts and sorting the tangled business affairs of his uncle Theodorick Bland. He ultimately became involved in Bacon's Rebellion and was executed.
