= Theodorick Bland of Cawsons =

American politician (1708–1784)

Theodorick Bland

Member of the Virginia Senate from Isle of Wight, Surry and Prince George Counties
- In office October 7, 1776 – May 2, 1779
- Preceded by: n/a
- Succeeded by: Nathaniel Harrison

Personal details
- Born: December 2, 1708 Prince George County, Colony of Virginia, U.S.
- Died: June 1, 1784 (aged 75)
- Spouse(s): Frances Bolling; Elizabeth Randolph
- Children: 6 including Theodorick Bland, Frances Bland Randolph Tucker
- Profession: Planter politician

Theodorick Bland (December 2, 1708 – 1784), also known as Theodorick Bland, Sr. or Theodorick Bland of Cawsons, was Virginia planter who served as a member of the first Virginia Senate, as well as a militia officer and clerk of Prince George County, Virginia.

== Early and family life ==
Bland was born into the First Families of Virginia, the son of Richard Bland and Elizabeth Randolph, the daughter of William Randolph I.

Around 1738, Bland married for the first time, to Frances Bolling, the daughter of Drury Bolling, and who inherited Kippax plantation on the Appomattox River. They had six children: (Note: One source mistakenly indicates that Bland had five children with Frances Bolling (Elizabeth, Mary, Anna, Jenny, and Theodorick Jr) and two more after marrying Elizabeth Randolph, the widow of William Yates (Patsy and Frances).)

- Elizabeth "Patsy" Bland (born January 4, 1739) married John Banister and had three sons.
- Theodorick Bland (March 21, 1741/42)
- Mary Bland (born August 22, 1745)
- Ann Bland (born September 5, 1747)
- Jane Bland (born September 30, 1749)
- Frances Bland (born September 24, 1752) first married John Randolph, the son of Burgess Richard Randolph, and had four children (including John Randolph of Roanoke); then later married St. George Tucker and had five children (including Henry St. George Tucker, Sr. and Nathaniel Beverley Tucker).

Bland later married Elizabeth Randolph the daughter of Edward Randolph, the granddaughter of William Randolph I, and the widow of William Yates.

== Career ==
Coat of Arms of Theodorick Bland

Described as "a plain practical man, with but slender advantages of education, of an ample fortune and respectable character", he was "a respected member of Virginia's glittering planter aristocracy". He initially operated and lived at Kippax Plantation along the Appomattox River (which became Hopewell) and later built a renowned mansion at his plantation, Cawsons plantation, located on a promontory where the Appomattox River turned north to meet the James River.

On November 15, 1758, Francis Fauquier, the Lieutenant Governor of Virginia Colony, appointed Bland colonel of the militia for Prince George County. Before the American Revolution, the Bland and Randolph families of Virginia frequently cooperated with each other to manage their plantations. After the Gunpowder Incident at the beginning of the war, Bland, along with his son, Theodorick Bland Jr, and his son-in-law, John Randolph, offered 40 slaves for sale to raise funds to replace the gunpowder seized by Lord Dunmore from the magazine in Williamsburg, Virginia. Around January 1781, St. George Tucker assisted Bland, his father-in-law, in escaping the advancing British Army commanded by Benedict Arnold. A few months later, the British Major-General William Phillips ordered that his troops in Prince George County not harm Bland's property.

In 1775, Bland owned a sorrel mare that had been imported from England by William Byrd III. Quaker-Lass was described in one stud book as "the finest looking mare in Virginia, of her day".

Following the American Revolutionary War, Bland moved westward into Amelia County, Virginia, where he developed another plantation using enslaved labor.

== Ancestry ==
Ancestors of Theodorick Bland of Cawsons

16. Adam Bland
8. John Bland
17. Joan Atkyns
4. Theodorick Bland of Westover
9. Susan DeClere
19. Marie de Dubleer
2. Richard Bland
20. Thomas Bennett
10. Richard Bennett
21. Anstie Tomson
5. Anne Bennett
22. John Utie
11. Mary Anne Utie
1. Theodorick Bland
24. William Randolph
12. Richard Randolph
25. Dorothy Lane
6. William Randolph
26. John Ryland
13. Elizabeth Ryland
3. Elizabeth Randolph
28. William Isham
14. Henry Isham
29. Mary Brett
7. Mary Isham
30. Christopher Banks
15. Katherine Banks

Bland was descended from Theodorick Bland of Westover, who emigrated from England and served as speaker of the House of Burgesses in 1660 and also represented Charles City County then newly formed Henrico County from 1661 to 1676. His paternal uncle was the surveyor Theodorick Bland.
