= 1st Continental Light Dragoons =

1st Continental Light Dragoons 1st Legionary Corps
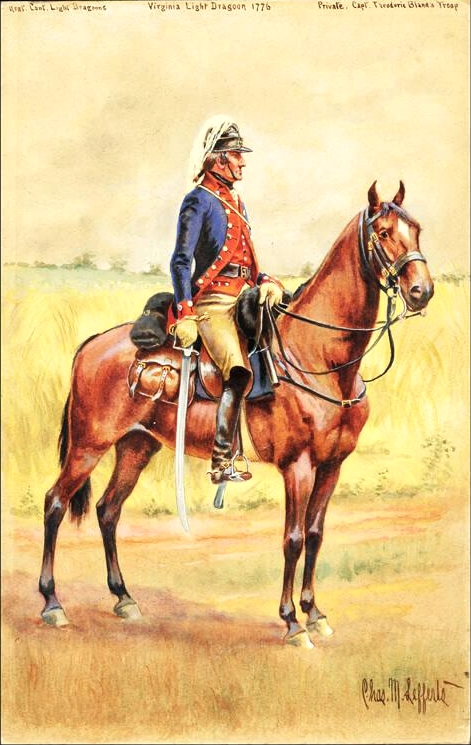
- Active: 1776–1783
- Allegiance: (United States) Continental Congress
- Type: Dragoon
- Size: 6 troops
- Part of: Continental Army
- Nickname: Bland's Horse
- Colors: brown coats with green facings, after 1781 blue coats with red facings
- Engagements: Battle of Brandywine, Battle of Germantown, Battle of Edgar's Lane, Battle of Guilford Court House, Battle of Cowpens

Commanders
- Notable commanders: Lt. Col. Theodorick Bland; Lt. Col. Anthony Walton White; Colonel William Washington.

The 1st Continental Light Dragoons, also known as Bland's Horse, was a mounted regiment of the Continental Army organized between 13 June and 10 September 1776 in Williamsburg, Virginia. It was made up of men from eastern and northern Virginia for service with the Continental Army.

== History ==
The Revolutionary Virginia Convention held in May 1776 resulted in delegates voting for a resolution to direct Virginia's delegates in Philadelphia to seek independence from the British and form a confederation of the colonies. They knew additional military strength was required. Virginia Governor Patrick Henry authorized Major-Commandant Theodorick Bland to raise a volunteer battalion. Bland had participated in the expulsion of Royal Governor Dunmore.

The 1st Continental Light Dragoons regiment was first authorized on 8 June 1776 in the Virginia State Troops as the 1st, 2d, 3d, 4th, 5th (Captain Henry "Light Horse Harry" Lee) and 6th Troops of Light Horse. On 25 June 1776 it mustered as the Virginia Light Horse Regiment. It was first adopted by and then accepted into the Continental Army, designated as the 1st Continental Light Dragoons on 25 November 1776.

Six months later, when General George Washington needed cavalry to counter that of the British, the Continental Congress on November 25, 1776 requested that Virginia transfer Major Bland's Light Horse to the Continental Army. Although reluctant, Virginia acceded to the request. Bland's Light Horse became the 1st Regiment of Continental Light Dragoons.

Bland had six troops of cavalry. Each contained 3 officers, 3 corporals, a drummer, a trumpeter, and 29 privates. Three quartermasters provided logistical support for the group. In March 1777 this 1st Regiment of Continental Light Dragoons — plus the three other regiments — were reorganized, resulting in a slight increase in their numbers.

The reorganized regimental headquarters consisted of a colonel, a lieutenant colonel and a major, who were supported in turn by a staff consisting of a chaplain, a quartermaster, a surgeon and mate, a paymaster, a riding master, a saddler, a trumpet major, an adjutant and 4 supernumeraries—cadets undergoing training who were used as the colonel's messengers.

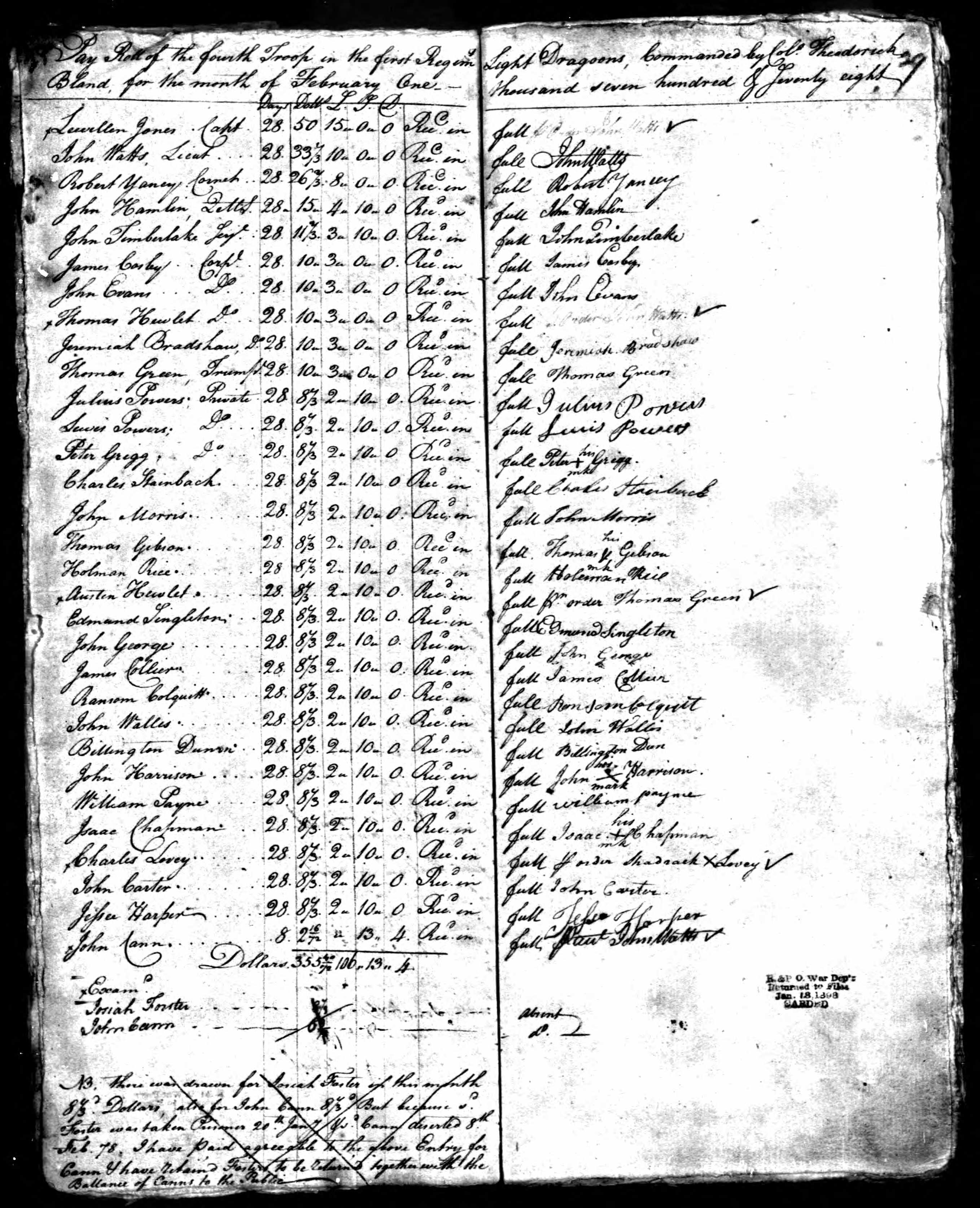
1778 Roster of Continental Light Dragoons

Each troop consisted of 32 privates, 1 armorer, 1 farrier, 1 trumpeter, 4 corporals, 1 quartermaster sergeant, a drill or an orderly sergeant, a cornet, a lieutenant, and a captain—a total of 280 men and officers. Whether any of the four regiments of Dragoons was ever at full strength is uncertain. The 2nd Continental Light Dragoons hailed from Connecticut and was led by Elisha Sheldon. It fought with distinction, whether mounted or unmounted, and at war's end had 225 men. The 3rd Regiment—"Lady Washington's Dragoons"—was also from Virginia. The 3rd was commanded by Lieutenant-Colonel George Baylor and seconded by Major Alexander Clough, one of George Washington's spies. The 3rd was the victim of a heinous act of war when they were attacked in their billet and refused quarter in 1778. The 4th and final regiment drew its membership from Pennsylvania, Maryland, Virginia, and New Jersey. The 4th suffered great losses at the Battle of Camden.

So at the very best in 1777, there were 1120 dragoons in the Continental Army, considerably under the 3,000 troops authorized by the Continental Congress. Officers aside, there were no other mounted troops in the whole continental army. The English also had limited cavalry, fielding their 16th Queen's Lancers and 17th Regiment of Dragoons. Light Horse Harry Lee gained national fame from his service with the 1st Continental Regiment at the Battle of Paulus Hook and in the Southern Campaign.

On 31 March 1777 in General Orders, George Washington named promoted officers of the 1st Light Dragoons.

Theodorick Bland Esqr., Major, Comdt. to be Colonel thereof. Capt. Benjamin Temple of the 2nd. The troop is appointed the Lt. Col. Capt. John Jameson of the 3rd. The troop is appointed the Major. Lieut. Cuth. Harrison of the 2nd. The troop is appointed Captain of the same. Lieut. Alexander S. Dandridge of the 4th. is appointed Captain of the 3rd. Captain Alexander Johnson, Lieut. John Belfield of the 5th. is appointed Captain of the 6th; vacant by the resignation of Capt. Nelson. Cornet William Lindsay of the 3rd. The troop is appointed Lieutenant of the same. Cornet William Watts of the 4th. is appointed Lieut. of the same. Cornet Henry Peyton of the 5th is appointed Lieutenant of the same. Cornet Henry Clements of the 6th. is appointed Lieut. of the second. Mr. Cole Diggs, the Cadet, is appointed Cornet of the 3rd. Troop. Mr. Robert Yauncey, the Cadet, is appointed Cornet of the 4th. Troop.

On 7 April 1778 Lee's Troop was replaced by Captain Addison Lewis's Troop. Lee's Troop was expanded into Lee's Legion, designated the 2nd Partisan Corps in 1781. The 1st Continental Light Dragoons were reassigned to the Southern Department on 8 November 1778, when the Corps of Continental Light Dragoons was broken up as an organization. The regiment was officially reorganized on 1 January 1781, consisting of four mounted and two dismounted troops. It was redesignated as the 1st Legionary Corps. Captain Samuel Van Leer was also a member of this regiment. On 2 November 1782, reflecting an amalgamation that had occurred in the spring of 1780, the unit was consolidated with the 3rd Legionary Corps, maintaining five troops. The new unit was designated 1st Legionary Corps.

The regiment saw action at the Battle of Brandywine, Battle of Germantown and the Battle of Guilford Court House. The regiment was disbanded on November 15, 1783, at Winchester, Virginia.

== Bibliography ==
- Wright, Robert K. Jr. (1983). The Continental Army. Army Lineage Series. Washington, D.C.: United States Army Center of Military History. CMH Pub 60-4. Archived from the original on 9 October 2019.
- Washington, George. "The writings of George Washington from the original manuscript sources. Vol. 7. University of Virginia".
