= Richard Cocke =

American politician

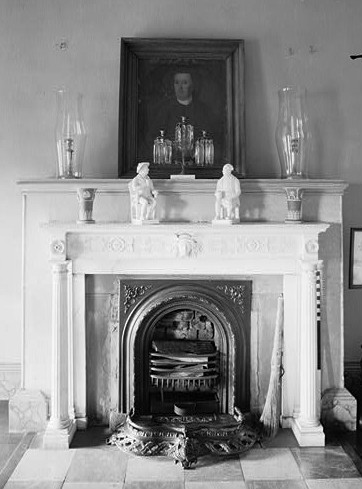
- Portrait of Richard Cocke IV (Bremo, 1771) by John Durand
- Born: 1597; Stottesdon, Shropshire, England
- Died: 1665 (aged 67–68); Henrico County, Virginia

Richard Cocke (1597–1665) was a colonial Virginia planter and politician. He established a political and social dynasty that firmly seated itself as among the most prominent in Virginia.

== Early life ==
Richard Cocke was born in 1597 at Pickthorn, Stottesdon, Shropshire and baptized Dec. 13, 1597 at Sidbury. Richard was the son of Thomas Cocke, who was the son of William and Elizabeth Cocke. Richard had an older sister, Eleanor, born in 1591. His family was only one of several families with the name Cocke living about Shropshire at this time. Richard's early education is not known, but he was both literate and educated enough to act as an attorney in court.

== Arrival in Virginia ==
The first Virginia record of Richard Cocke is from December 24, 1627, when he appeared at the court in Jamestown to give testimony as the purser of the Thomas and John that four men of Mr. Sharples had run away while being transported to Virginia. Cocke again appeared on February 10, 1629, as Patrick Canada's attorney and ordered to take custody of Thomas Hunter's estate on behalf of Patrick Canada.

== Settlement and family ==
Cocke was definitively settled in Virginia by 1632; the court recorded that he married Temperance Bailey, the widow of John Browne, on June 5, 1632, and settled Browne's estate with a fee of 6,397 pounds of tobacco. Temperance was born about 1617 in Virginia, as is found living at Jordan's Journey in the household of Cecily Jordan in the 1624/25 Jamestown Muster. Temperance married between the age of 13 and 14 John Browne with whom she had children. Richard Cocke and Temperance had two known sons, Thomas and Richard. Also a daughter Elizabeth. Following the death of Temperance he married Mary Aston, a daughter of Walter Aston, with whom he had children including another son Richard (married to Elizabeth and father of Anne Mary Cocke, wife of Robert Bolling Jr., son of Robert Bolling and wife Anne Stith), John, William, and Edward. His two sons named Richard have traditionally been differentiated as Richard the Elder and Richard the Younger.

== Landholdings ==
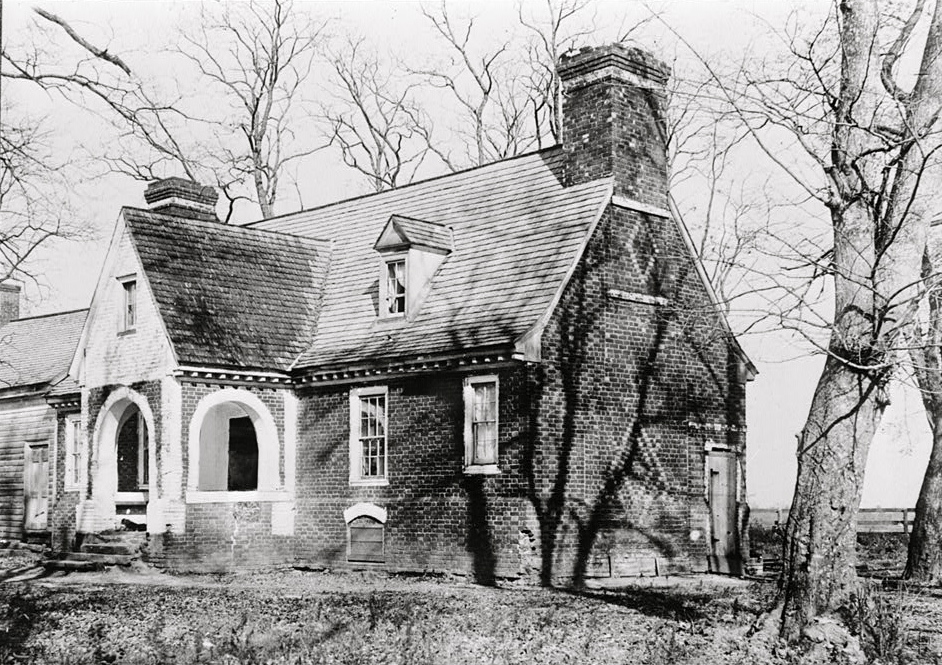
Malvern Hill built by Thomas Cocke

Richard Cocke "Gentleman" patented 3,000 acres near the lands of John Price, Thomas Hallam and Thomas Harris in Henrico County on March 6, 1636, and expanded his holdings further on March 10, 1639, with an additional 2,000 acres. On December 6, 1652, he added 2,842 more acres in Henrico County with an added 100 acres on the Chickahominy on Aug 24th, 1664. Cocke's last acquisition was in partnership with John Beauchamp on June 21, 1664, consisting of 2,974 acres on the south side of the Chickahominy. Beauchamp confirmed his portion to Cocke's sons after his death. By the time Richard Cocke died he was in possession of 10,916 acres of land spread over three sites named, 'Bremo" (his home site), 'Malvern Hill' and 'Curles'. He is also known to have owned property in present-day Surry County, Virginia where he first resided in the early 1630s.

== Virginia House of Burgesses ==
Richard Cocke served in as a member of the House of Burgesses periodically throughout his life. He is first recorded in 1632 representing Weyanoke. Cocke later represented Henrico in sessions from 1644 to 1654. In addition to his service in the House of Burgesses he was also a Colonel of the local militia and a justice of the court.
