= Walter Aston (burgess) =

Virginia political figure, planter and militia leader

- Born: 1606
- Died: April 6, 1656 (aged 49–50)
- Known for: Virginian political figure, planter and militia

Lieutenant Colonel Walter Aston (c.1606–April 6, 1656) was a Virginia political figure, planter and militia leader. Aston served as a member of the Virginia House of Burgesses in the first half of the 17th century.

== Biography ==
Aston was born in England and came to Virginia in approximately 1628.

Aston represented Shirley Hundred Island for the first time from 1629 to 1630. He continued to be a member of the Virginia House of Burgesses from 1631–1632, 1632–1633, 1641, 1642-1643. Aston later served as a justice of the peace for Charles City County, and by the time he died on April 6, 1656. he was a Lieutenant Colonel of the Virginia militia. Aston was buried at the original Westover Parish Church, Charles City County, Virginia. He was buried at Westover Parish Church (in the cemetery on the grounds west of Westover Plantation, not in the graveyard next to the new church).

== Family ==
Coat of Arms of Walter Aston

Aston married twice, first to a woman whose given name was Warbowe, but whose maiden surname is unknown, then to Hannah Jordan who outlived him. His son, Walter Aston, Jr. (died January 29, 1667), is buried near his father.

Aston is buried near the original site of the Westover Church next to Theodorick Bland of Westover and near Benjamin Harrison.

United States Presidents George H. W. Bush and George W. Bush are descended from Lt. Col. Aston through his daughter Mary who married Col. Richard Cocke.
