= Robert Beverley Jr. =

American historian (died 1722)

Member of the House of Burgesses for Jamestown
- In office 1699–1702
- Preceded by: Lewis Burwell
- Succeeded by: Nathaniel Burwell

Member of the House of Burgesses for King and Queen County
- In office 1720–1720 Serving with George Braxton
- Preceded by: John Baylor
- Succeeded by: Richard Johnson

Personal details
- Born: 1667 Jamestown, Colony of Virginia, British America
- Died: April 21, 1722 (aged 54–55) King and Queen County, Colony of Virginia, British America
- Spouse: Ursula Byrd (m. 1697)
- Children: William Beverley
- Relatives: Robert Beverley (father); Peter Beverley (brother)
- Known for: History and Present State of Virginia

Robert Beverley Jr. (c.1667—April 21, 1722) was a historian of early colonial Virginia, as well as a planter and politician.

== Early and family life ==
Beverley was born in Jamestown, the second of three sons of the widow Mary Keeble and her second husband, Major Robert Beverley. Major Beverley had emigrated to the Virginia colony from Hull in Yorkshire, England and became the Clerk of the House of Burgesses, in which several of his descendants would serve. Thus, Major Beverley founded one of the First Families of Virginia during the colonial era. The Beverley household also included an elder half-brother Peter Beverley (who would not only serve in the House of Burgesses but became its speaker and the colony's Treasurer), several full brothers and at least two daughters. His father and elder full brother both died before this Robert Beverley reached legal age, so a guardian, local merchant and future burgess William Churchill, who had succeeded to the Beverley merchant relationship with Jeffreys and Company in London, was appointed to handle the estate for the children. Robert Beverley ultimately succeeded his half-brother Peter as the guardian of his full brother John Beverley. Virginia at the time having no public schools and limited educational options other than private tutors, Robert Beverley was educated in England, possibly at Beverley Grammar School in Yorkshire.

== Jamestown official and politician ==
Beverley followed the career paths of his father and half-brother, securing influence with a series of public offices of increasing responsibility, as well as securing plantations and eventually becoming a Burgess in his own right. In 1688, the year following his father's death, Beverley worked as a copyist in Jamestown, assisting the colony's secretary as well as becoming a deputy clerk of the surrounding James City County. However, when Governor Francis Nicholson ousted William Edwards as the chief clerk of the General Court and the colony's secretary, Beverley probably also lost his position. However, in the summer of 1692, his uncle Christopher Robinson became the colony's secretary and appointed his nephew as clerk of King and Queen County nearby. Although Christopher Robinson died the next year, his successor was Ralph Wormeley, a planter in Middlesex County and friend of the Robinson family. Wormeley appointed Peter Beverley as the Chief Clerk of the General Court and the colony's secretary, so Robert began working for his half-brother, who had also succeeded their father as Clerk for the House of Burgesses. Robert became clerk to the Committee of Public Claims in March 1693. In May 1693 Robert filled in for his brother as clerk of the General Court, and in October 1693 succeeded Peter Beverley as clerk of the General Court, as well as the colony's secretary and clerk of James City County. He also substituted for James Sherlock as clerk for the Governor's Council and as clerk of the General Assembly for the 1696 term. In June 1697, Beverley became clerk of the court of Vice-Admiralty. When fire destroyed the statehouse at Jamestown on October 20, 1698, Peter and Robert Beverley salvaged many valuable papers, but Robert resigned as chief clerk about a month later.

In 1699, citizens of Jamestown elected Beverley to represent them in the House of Burgesses, and re-elected him in 1700. In 1699, Beverley also was appointed to the committee to revise the colony's laws. Meanwhile, Beverley had purchased land in Jamestown and nearby Elizabeth City County. He was appointed to the Elizabeth City County court on December 27, 1700, but that body (which also held administrative powers over the county) soon found itself in litigation, and the General Court decided adversely to it, so Beverley appealed to the Privy Council and set sail for England to prosecute the case in 1703. However, Francis Nicholson returned to the colony as its governor, and not only removed him as clerk of the House of Burgesses, but engineered his removal as clerk of King and Queen County.

== Westward adventure and literary career ==
Beverley's most notable work is his History and Present State of Virginia, published originally in London in 1705 (while Beverley was in London prosecuting the Elizabeth City County land case, which he lost, but which also gave him access to government records in London). It documents the history of early life in the Virginia colony. Three French-language editions were published between 1707 and 1718, which one historian believes were distributed as promotional literature to encourage emigration. The treatise reflected his father's loyalty to former governor Sir William Berkeley, and was critical of Nicholson, and so might have helped Nicholson's recall at about the same time as the treatise's publication.

Beverley returned to Virginia and became a tobacco planter in King and Queen County, living on the plantation he called "Beverley Park." However, his experiments in viticulture were not successful Beverly also in 1719 acquired a large interest in an iron foundry. When Alexander Spotswood became the colony's governor (technically lieutenant governor to an Englishman) Beverley cultivated a relationship with him. He probably accompanied Spotswood in 1716 on his "Knights of the Golden Horseshoe Expedition" to the Shenandoah Valley. Journalist John Fontaine records that on the return trip, both Beverley and his horse fell, and rolled to the bottom of a hill, but without serious injury to either. However, when Beverley published a revised edition of his History in 1722, he continued it only to 1710, so there is no known account by Beverley of this event. Beverley also completed the revision of the colony's laws, published in 1720 as 'An Abridgement of the Publick Laws of Virginia, In Force and Use, June 10, 1720' and dedicated the volume to Spotswood. It was published by Beverley's London publisher in 1722, after Beverley added abridgements of the acts of the assembly during its November to December 1720 session (in which Beverley represented King and Queen County). The publisher also published a second edition of Beverley's 'History', which removed some critical remarks about Virginia customs as well as about former Governor Nicholson, as well as brought the volume up to date.

Concerning slavery, in the 1722 re-edition, Beverley says that whilst both black males and females were likely to work in fields, white women were not.

== Death and legacy ==
On April 21, 1722, Beverley died at Beverley Park, his estate in King and Queen County, Virginia. He was buried at the Jamestown Church cemetery. Beverley probably helped his son become clerk of Essex County, and bequeathed a large estate to him. However, there is no evidence that he ever saw the second edition of his 'History' or the first edition of his 'Abridgement.'

== Personal life and descendants ==
Coat of Arms of Robert Beverly, Jr

Coat of Arms of William Beverley

Robert Beverley Jr. married Ursula Byrd, the daughter of Burgess and prominent planter William Byrd I and his wife Mary Byrd (the heiress of former Charles City County burgess Warham Horsmanden) in 1697. Their only child, Colonel William Beverley (1698–1756) also served in the House of Burgesses and married Elizabeth Bland, daughter of planter, lawyer and burgess Richard Bland.
