= Richard Bland (burgess) =

Virginia planter

Burgesses representing Charles City County
- In office 1693–1694
- Preceded by: John Stith
- Succeeded by: Thomas Chamberlain

Burgesses representing Charles City County
- In office 1700–1704 Serving with Joseph Wynn, Joshua Winn, Drury Stith, Edward Hill
- Preceded by: Robert Bolling
- Succeeded by: Benjamin Harrison

Burgesses representing Prince George County
- In office 1705–1706 Serving with Robert Bolling
- Preceded by: William Harrison
- Succeeded by: John Hardiman

Personal details
- Born: August 11, 1665 London, England
- Died: April 1720 (aged 54) Jordan Point plantation, Prince George County, Virginia, English America
- Spouse(s): Mary Swann; Elizabeth Randolph
- Occupation: Planter, politician

Richard Bland I (August 11, 1665 – April 1720), (Note: The specific date of death has been given as April 6, 1720, April 10, 1720, and April 11, 1720.) sometimes known as Richard Bland of Jordan's Point, (Note: Richard Bland's son, Richard Bland, is also referred to in some sources as Richard Bland of Jordan's Point.) was a Virginia planter and member of the Virginia House of Burgesses, and the father of Founding Father Richard Bland.

== Early and family life ==
Coat of Arms of Richard Bland

The son of Theodorick Bland of Westover, and his wife Anna Bennett, the daughter of Governor Richard Bennett and wife Mary Ann Utie. (Note: Some references spell Anna Bennett's name as "Anne".), Bland was born into the First Families of Virginia. His maternal grandfather Richard Bennett was the first elected Governor of the Colony of Virginia, during the English Commonwealth period. His brothers were the surveyor Theodorick Bland and John Bland, who was the great-grandfather of Chancellor Theodorick Bland of Maryland.

Bland married Mary Swann, the daughter of councillor Thomas Swann. They had seven children, none of whom reached adulthood. After his first wife died in September 1700, the widower remarried in Accomack County on February 11, 1701/02, to Elizabeth Randolph, daughter of William Randolph and wife Mary Isham. They had five children before she too predeceased Bland:

- Mary Bland (born August 21, 1704), oldest daughter, married Henry Lee I and had four children, including Henry Lee II who was the father of Henry "Light-Horse Harry" Lee III and the grandfather of Robert E. Lee.
- Elizabeth Bland (born May 29, 1706), 2nd born daughter, married Colonel William Beverley, the son of Robert Beverley Jr., and had four children. The Beverleys were indirect lineal descendants of Pocahontas through their marriage to The Randolphs.
- Anna Bland (born circa 1708), 3rd born daughter, married twice. She had three children with her first husband, Robert Munford, and had two children with her second husband, George Currie.
- Theodorick Bland (born 2 December 1718), youngest son, married Frances Bolling, the daughter of Drury Bolling, and had five children, including Congressman Theodorick Bland.
- Richard Bland (born May 6, 1710), oldest son and heir, married Anne Poythress and had twelve children. According to Lyon Gardiner Tyler, his second marriage was to Martha Macon and his third marriage was to Elizabeth Blair. (Note: Reports differ regarding the names or number of subsequent wives. According to Earl Gregg Swem, Bland's second wife was Elizabeth Harrison but notes that other accounts said she was Elizabeth Bolling, the daughter of John Bolling Jr. and Elizabeth Blair. Tyler initially reported that Martha Massie married Theodrick Bland after the death of William Massie.)

Bland's many notable descendants, in addition to his son and namesake, include Roger Atkinson Pryor and Joseph Pembroke Thom, a Speaker of the Maryland House of Delegates.

== Career ==
Bland operated plantations using enslaved labor. He was also a county commissioner of Charles City County and later Prince George County, a member of the founding Board of Visitors of The College of William & Mary, and is noted in the church records as a member of the Vestry of Bruton Parish Church in Williamsburg, Virginia, which authorized in 1710 the building of the present Church structure.

When his father died in 1671, Bland's elder brother, Theodorick inherited Westover Plantation and legally joined Richard in its ownership. The brothers eventually conveyed 1,200 acres of the Westover Plantation lands in Charles City County to William Byrd I in 1688 for £300 and 10,000 pounds of tobacco and cask. Richard Bland then established the Jordan's Point Plantation across the James River in Prince George County, where he died in 1720.

== Death and legacy ==
Preceding her husband in death, Elizabeth Randolph Bland died January 1720.

== Ancestry ==
Ancestors of Richard Bland (burgess)

16. Roger Bland
8. Adam Bland
17.
4. John Bland
18. William Atkyns
9. Joan Atkyns
19. Jane Molyneux
2. Theodorick Bland of Westover
20. Joos de Dobbeleer
10. Dietrich de Dobbeler II
21. Joanna Maria Van Winterbeecke
5. Susanna de Dobbelere
22. Corneille le Brun
11. Maria le Brun
23. Anna Cocquiel dit le Mercier
1. Richard Bland
24. Robert Bennett
12. Thomas Bennett
25. Elizabeth Edney/Ednye
6. Richard Bennett
13. Anstie Tomson
3. Anna Bennett
7. Mary Anne Longworth
