= Theodorick Bland of Westover =

Virginia colonial politician

Theodorick Bland

12th Speaker of the Virginia House of Burgesses
- In office 1660–1660
- Preceded by: Edward Hill, Sr.
- Succeeded by: Henry Soane

Burgesses representing Charles City County
- In office 1660
- Preceded by: Edward Hill, Sr.
- Succeeded by: Edward Hill, Jr.

Burgesses representing Charles City County
- In office 1661–1622
- Preceded by: n/a
- Succeeded by: William Byrd

Member of the Virginia Governor's Council
- In office 1663-1671

Personal details
- Born: January 16, 1629 London, England
- Died: April 23, 1671 (aged 42) Westover plantation, Henrico County, Virginia, English America
- Resting place: Westover churchyard
- Spouse(s): Anna Bennett; Elizabeth Randolph
- Occupation: Merchant, planter, politician

Theodorick Bland (January 16, 1629 – April 23, 1671), also known as Theodorick Bland of Westover, was a planter, merchant and politician in colonial Virginia who served as Speaker of the House of Burgesses, as well as in both houses of the Virginia General Assembly. The founder of the Bland family of Virginia, his son and grandson of the same name also served in the Virginia General Assembly before the American Revolutionary War, and later descendants sharing the same name would become a federal judge and congressman.

== Early and family life ==
Born in London, the ninth son of prominent merchant John Bland (1573-1632) and his wife Susan. Although his father died when he was a boy, his eldest brother John Bland (d. 1680) succeeded their father as head of the family's mercantile firm. His birth family included sixteen children. Bland received a private education appropriate to his class.

== Career ==
=== Merchant, tax collector and planter ===
His father had been a member of the Virginia Company of London and Bland joined his family's business, becoming its agent in Spain and the Canary Islands while in his early twenties. He moved to the Virginia colony in 1653, to replace his brother Edward, who had been the enterprise's Virginia factor, but died in 1652. Bland initially lived on the Berkeley Hundred (until 1665 as discussed below) and traded in Charles City County. Upon this man's death, as discussed below, his nephew Giles Bland emigrated to the Virginia colony to handle the family's Virginia estates and business, but was executed in 1677 for his part in Bacon's Rebellion.

Meanwhile, in 1662, the Virginia General Assembly passed an export tax of 2 shillings per hogshead of tobacco, and Bland became its first collector.

In 1665, Englishman Sir John Pawlett, by deeds of lease and release, sold 1,200 acres (4.9 km^{2}) known as Westover Plantation in Charles City County to Bland for £170, and Bland soon gave the county and fellow parishioners a church and ten acres of land. Herring Creek and Kimeges plantations also were in Charles City County, and marked by historical markers; Jordan's plantation was in King George County after Charles City County was divided in this man's lifetime. Bland later invested in real estate further upstream on the James, York and Blackwater rivers in the Tidewater region. Bland's will named his plantations as Bartletts, Kimeges, Herring Creek Mill, Jordans, Westeffer [sic], Upper Chipppoakes, Sunken Marsh, Basse's Choice, Lawne's Creek, and Bland also owned a house lot in the colonial capital at Jamestown. Lawne's Creek and Chippoakes plantations are in Surry County, as probably was Sunken Marsh. Basse's Choice plantation is in Isle of Wight County.

=== Politician ===
Charles City County voters first elected Bland as one of their representatives in the 1660 House of Burgesses session, and fellow members elected him as their Speaker. Thus Bland presided over the legislature during the transition from the Cromwell Protectorate to the restored government of Charles II, with Governor Berkeley after extensive negotiations accepting the legislature's offer to serve as interim governor until resolution of the English succession, and further agreeing to call the assembly into session at least every two years and not dissolve it without the house's consent, as well as to issue all writs in the assembly's name. During the next legislative session, Bland was not re-elected speaker and represented newly formed Henrico County. In 1664, Bland accepted promotion to the legislature's upper body, the Governor's Council and resigned in 1671, shortly before his death. He also served as a justice of the peace for Charles City County through at least 1664, the justices of that day jointly administering the county in addition to their adjudicative duties.

== Personal life ==
Coat of Arms of Theodorick Bland

Bland married Anna Bennett, the daughter of Governor Richard Bennett and his heiress wife Mary Ann Utie (widow of the late burgess John Utie Sr.). They had three sons:

- Theodorick Bland (1663-1700); he married Margaret Mann and had two sons, John and Theodorick.
- Richard Bland (1665-1720); he married twice. His first wife Mary Swann, daughter of councillor Thomas Swann, bore seven children, who all died as children. After Mary's death, Bland married Elizabeth Randolph, the daughter of burgess William Randolph I. The couple had five children including Richard Bland II and Theodorick Bland of Cawsons.
- John Bland (born February 8, 1668); also married twice. He first married Mary Breckon, then remarried and had at least three children with his second wife, Elizabeth Dale: Richard, John (who was the grandfather of Chancellor Theodorick Bland), and Anna. John returned to England, settled in Scarborough, North Yorkshire and was responsible for the construction of Bland's Cliff.

Other Bland descendants include Roger Atkinson Pryor.

== Death and legacy ==
Bland died at his Westover plantation in 1671 or 1672 and was buried in the chancel of the original Westover Church (which he had built).

However, his financial affairs were not in order at his death, in part because of the transatlantic nature of the family's business, unresolved debts and his failure to distinguish his own property from that of the company which his brother headed in England. His widow, Ann, contacted his brother John and asked him to help settle the financial affairs. Instead, John Bland sent his son, Giles Bland, who proved sharp-tongued (antagonizing his aunt, Governor Berkeley and many others) and politically inept and was ultimately executed following his participation in Bacon's Rebellion. After John Bland died in 1680, his widow Sarah Bland then sailed to the Virginia colony to obtain redress. This man's widow Ann had powerful political connections, both through her father (a member of the Virginia Governor's Council, which was also the appellate body of the state legislature), as well as through her Utie half brothers. Furthermore, she had married the widower St. Leger Codd, a lawyer and military officer responsible for constructing defenses of the Potomac River area and who had a plantation near the border of Lancaster and Northumberland counties. Codd would briefly represent both counties in the House of Burgesses, but would flee to Maryland with his wife and family because of financial difficulties in Virginia (some probably related to this litigation), but later sat in both houses of the Maryland legislature. Virginia Governor Effingham used Sarah Bland's litigation to limit the judicial powers of the Virginia Governor's Council. Ann Bennett Bland Codd died at Wharton's Creek in Maryland in November, 1687. The "Bland family" became one of the First Families of Virginia, and his son and grandson of the same name would also sit in the Virginia General Assembly.

Pursuant to primogeniture, his eldest son, Theodorick, inherited Westover plantation. With his brother, Richard and a mixture of indentured and enslaved labor, he operated that plantation until 1688. In that year, the brothers sold their 1,200 acres to William Byrd I for £300 and 10,000 pounds of tobacco and casks. A successor Westover Church (built 1730) is on the National Register of Historic Places, although rebuilt outside the Westover plantation grounds. Bland remains buried in the graveyard near Walter Aston and Captain William Perry. Some of the Bland family's papers are held by the Swem Library of the College of William and Mary. A selection of papers from his son Richard has been published.
