= Giles Bland =

Participant in Bacon's Rebellion (c. 1647 – 1677)

- Born: 1647; England
- Died: March 27, 1677 (aged 29); Jamestown, Colony of Virginia
- Cause of death: Execution by hanging
- Conviction: Treason
- Penalty: Death

Giles Bland (c. 1647 – 1677) was an English-born Virginia colonist during the 1670s. He was royal customs collector in the colony and an acting attorney for his family. His uncle was Theodorick Bland of Westover, which led to a drawn-out legal proceeding upon Theodorick's widow. An outspoken anti-authoritarian, Bland eventually rebelled against Governor William Berkeley and the Virginia General Assembly, joining Nathaniel Bacon in a revolt in 1676. He was captured and executed in 1677.

== Early life and family ==
Giles Bland was christened on October 26, 1647, in St Olave's Church, Hart Street, London, England. His father was John Bland (1612-1680) and Sarah Bland (née Greene). He had an older brother, John (II).

Giles Bland married Frances Povey, daughter of Thomas Povey.

Gile's uncle was Theodorick Bland of Westover whose wife was Ann(a) (née Bennett), daughter of Governor Richard Bennett. When Theodorick died in 1671/2, many debts were unsettled and the Bland family's estate matters were left as Anna's responsibility.

== In Virginia ==
Giles Bland emigrated to Virginia around 1673 to handle the family estate matters. Bland was also royal customs collector for Charles II. In disagreement of widow Anna's control of the Bland estate, Giles ended up on a protacted legal battle. Anna Bennett had powerful allies in the government and general court. St. Leger Codd, a lawyer and Virginia planter would become involved in the matter, and would eventually marry Anna in 1675/6.

Giles Bland got involved in a quarrel with Virginia Secretary Thomas Ludwell in September, 1674. After sharing drinks with Henry Chicheley, Bland and Ludwell insulted one another, came to blows and exchanged gloves (as to duel later). Bland pinned the glove of Ludwell's to the statehouse door with a note:

"[Ludwell is a] Sonn of a Whore mechannick Fellow puppy and a Coward"

Members of the House of Burgesses asked Governor Berkeley to arrest Bland for the "public affront". Bland was arrested, gave a half-hearted apology, and was fined £500.

In April 1676, Giles Bland wrote to Sir Joseph Williamson in England, complaining of treatment by the figures of Berkeley, Joseph Bridger, and Philip Ludwell. The Virginia Governor's Council suspended his collector role and jailed him.

== Rebellion and death ==
Giles Bland joined the forces of Nathaniel Bacon in 1676. The leadership desired to send Bland to England to lobby for the insurrection, but the effort was never acted upon. Instead, Bland was put in charge of capturing Governor Berkeley in an attempt to end the regime. Bland was captured by Berkeley's forces and he was imprisoned on a ship in the York River captained by a Jno. Martin [sic].

Bland was convicted of treason and "other misdemeanors". He was hanged in Jamestown on March 27, 1677. He was 29 years old.

== Notes ==
Further reading

- Billings, Warren M. "Bland, Giles" in the Dictionary of Virginia Biography, Vol. 2, edited by Sara B. Bearss et al., 7–8. Richmond: Library of Virginia, 2001.
