= William Byrd I =

English-born colonialist and politician 1652–1704

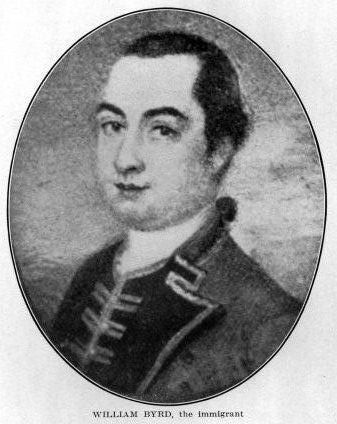
- Portrait of Byrd

Member of the Virginia Governor's Council
- In office 1685 – 1704

Member of the House of Burgesses representing Henrico County
- In office 1677 – 1682
- Preceded by: Nathaniel Bacon
- Succeeded by: William Randolph

Personal details
- Born: William Bird c. 1652 Shadwell, London, England
- Died: December 4, 1704 (aged 51–52) Westover Plantation, Colony of Virginia, English America
- Spouse: Mary (Horsmanden) Filmer (m. 1673)
- Children: 4, including William II
- Relatives: William Beverley (grandson)
- Occupation: Colonist; planter; politician

William Byrd I (née Bird; c. 1652 – December 4, 1704) was an English-born Virginia colonist, planter, enslaver, and politician. In Virginia, the spelling Byrd became standard, and several further generations of his descendants would share the same name, as well as hold important political offices and, increasingly, operate plantations using enslaved labor.

== Early life ==
Coat of Arms of William Byrd

Born circa 1649 or 1652 in London. His father John Bird (c. 1620–1677) was a goldsmith, and raised his family in the Shadwell section of London, although his family's ancestral roots were in Cheshire. His mother was Grace Stegge, and her politically connected merchant uncle, Thomas Stegge urged young Byrd try trading in the Virginia colony across the Atlantic Ocean.

== Virginia planter and trader ==
In March 1669, William Bird/Byrd immigrated to Virginia, two years before Stegge's death in March 1671, after which he would inherit Stegge's significant landholdings. On October 27, 1673, Byrd was granted 1,200 acres (5 km^{2}) on the James River, including at the fall line, where in this era Native Americans were becoming increasingly distressed at colonists' incursions into their territory, particularly land grabs to cultivate tobacco. Byrd established a trading post for furs and became well-connected with not only this Native American and frontiersman customers, but the landed gentry of the Tidewater region further downstream. Some of Byrd's landholdings became (after his death) part of the site of modern-day Richmond, Virginia. His first recording patent was issud on October 27, 1673, for 1200 acres of land on the James River and Shockoe Creek, near the falls of the James River and what became Richmond.

In 1676, Byrd was a sympathizer of Nathaniel Bacon in Bacon's Rebellion. He took an active part in the rebellion, first by helping persuade Bacon to take unlawful command of a militia and lead it against Native Americans—first to the south where the Occannechee controlled the southern Appallachian fur trade from an island in the Dan river, and then northwest against the Pamunkey and Mattaponi in Gloucester County. He also rode with Bacon after the rebellion began and was involved in the sack of Warner Hall far to the east, confiscating goods amounting to £845, or the equivalent of what 40 slaves or servants would produce in a year. He later allied himself with the Governor and became a prominent citizen.

Also in 1676, Byrd established the James River Fort on the south bank of the James River in what is now known as Richmond's Manchester District. The legislature confirmed that landholding in 1679, conditioned upon him seating 50 men and not to exceed 20 men there. Byrd was elected to the Virginia House of Burgesses in 1677 and later served many years on the Governor's Council.

Byrd also imported enslaved Africans, and claimed land using headrights for importing them. At various times between 1677 and 1697, the Crown investigated claims of headright abuse, as some argued the granting of headrights rather than fostering development instead left thousands of acres fallow. Following the Glorious Revolution of 1688, price inflation and merchant ships lost during the 1689–1692 war with France greatly decreased tobacco tariff revenues, and caused a crisis in the colony. Between 1692 and 1695 Edward Randolph, the commissioner of customs, toured the American continental colonies, and published a report in 1695 about fraud in the tobacco trade in Virginia, Maryland and Pennsylvania. Thus, the Board of Trade was established in London in 1696 to replace the Lords of Trade, and John Locke was made its executive and charged with implementing a new colonial policy. Locke received a report from Commissary James Blair, about problems and proposed solutions for Virginia. That report discussed a land system that distributed 50 acre tracts for either headrights or kickbacks, with no consideration to cultivation, or whether distribution of great consolidated tracts impeded development within the colony. Blair noted that Virginians were now impoverished, lacking proper defenses against Native Americans or foreign raiders, and without economic diversification, nor enough labor to produce the tobacco revenues sought by the Crown. He proposed that each 500 acre tract should be required to become a working plantation within three years, or the land revert back to the Crown.

Governor Lord Effingham, per instructions from James II, attempted to enforce the Royal African Company monopoly from 1684-1689, despite a drastic decline in the supply of white indentured servants. In 1698 the Board of Trade instructed Governor Nicholson to substitute family farms for more speculative headright tract grants. It proposed that whoever occupied a vacant piece of land would receive one hundred acres apiece for himself and each laborer that he employs within 3 years of the patent grant. Thus, the royal governors began wresting control from the great planter class.

Although some considered headrights impermissible for importing blacks, such importation may have existed very early, although arguably in violation of the Great Charter which required that servants could only serve for seven years, and enslaved workers never completed their terms of service. After Effingham's removal, the great planters claimed 90,000 acres based on headrights for 1900 blacks.

In 1688, Theodorick Bland Jr. and his brother Richard conveyed 1,200 acres of their Westover Plantation property to William Byrd I in 1688 for £300 and 10,000 pounds of tobacco and cask. The mansion he built in 1690 were furnished with curtains, tables, chairs and bedsteads imported from Rotterdam. Byrd's grandson built a Georgian mansion there in the 1750s.

== Personal life ==
About 1673, he married a 21-year-old widow named Mary (née Horsmanden) Filmer, a native of Lenham, England. Mary's father had spent time in Virginia as a Cavalier fleeing Cromwell, and her former husband Samuel Filmer (third son of Tory author Robert Filmer) descended from the sister of Samuel Argall, governor of Virginia. William Byrd I and his wife would become the parents of William Byrd II and three daughters. Their daughter, Ursula, at age 16, married Robert Beverley Jr., Major Robert Beverley's son. They had one child, William Beverley (1698–1756), and Ursula died in 1698, within a year of her marriage. Colonel William Beverley married Richard Bland's daughter, Elizabeth Bland. They had four children. Their son, Robert, married Maria Carter on February 3, 1763. Her parents were Landon Carter and Maria Byrd.

== Death and legacy ==
Byrd died on December 4, 1704, at his plantation home of Westover, in Charles City County, Virginia. He is buried near the original site of the Westover Church.
