= Theodorick Bland (surveyor) =

Virginia colonial surveyor

Theodorick Bland (February 1663 – November 1700) was a Virginia surveyor who made a survey in 1693 of the Howson Patent, which is an area corresponding to present day Alexandria, Virginia. He also made a survey for Williamsburg, Virginia in 1699.

== Biography ==
Coat of Arms of Theodorick Bland

Bland was the oldest son of Theodorick Bland of Westover and Anna Bennett, the daughter of Governor Richard Bennett. His brothers were Richard Bland (who was the great-grandfather of Chancellor Theodorick Bland) and John Bland . Bland married Margaret Man and had two sons:

- John Bland (born December 8, 1698); he married Ann West and had at least three children, John, Theodorick, and Mary.
- Theodorick Bland, who died shortly after his father.

When his father died in 1671, Bland inherited Westover Plantation and joined with his brother, Richard, in its ownership. The brothers eventually conveyed 1,200 acres of the property to William Byrd I in 1688 for 300L and 10,000 pounds of tobacco and cask. Byrd's grandson built a Georgian mansion there in the 1750s.

== Ancestry ==
Ancestors of Theodorick Bland (surveyor)

16. Roger (or Robert) Bland
8. Adam Bland
4. John Bland
9. Jane/Joan Atkyns
2. Theodorick Bland of Westover
10. de Dublere
5. Susan Declere/Duclere/Dublere
11. Marie Emperour
1. Richard Bland
24. Robert Bennett
12. Thomas Bennett
25. Elizabeth Edney/Ednye
6. Richard Bennett
13. Anstie Tomson
3. Anna Bennett
7. Mary Anne Longworth (widow of Utie)
