= Westover Plantation =

Historic house in Virginia, United States

- U.S. National Register of Historic Places
- U.S. National Historic Landmark
- Virginia Landmarks Register
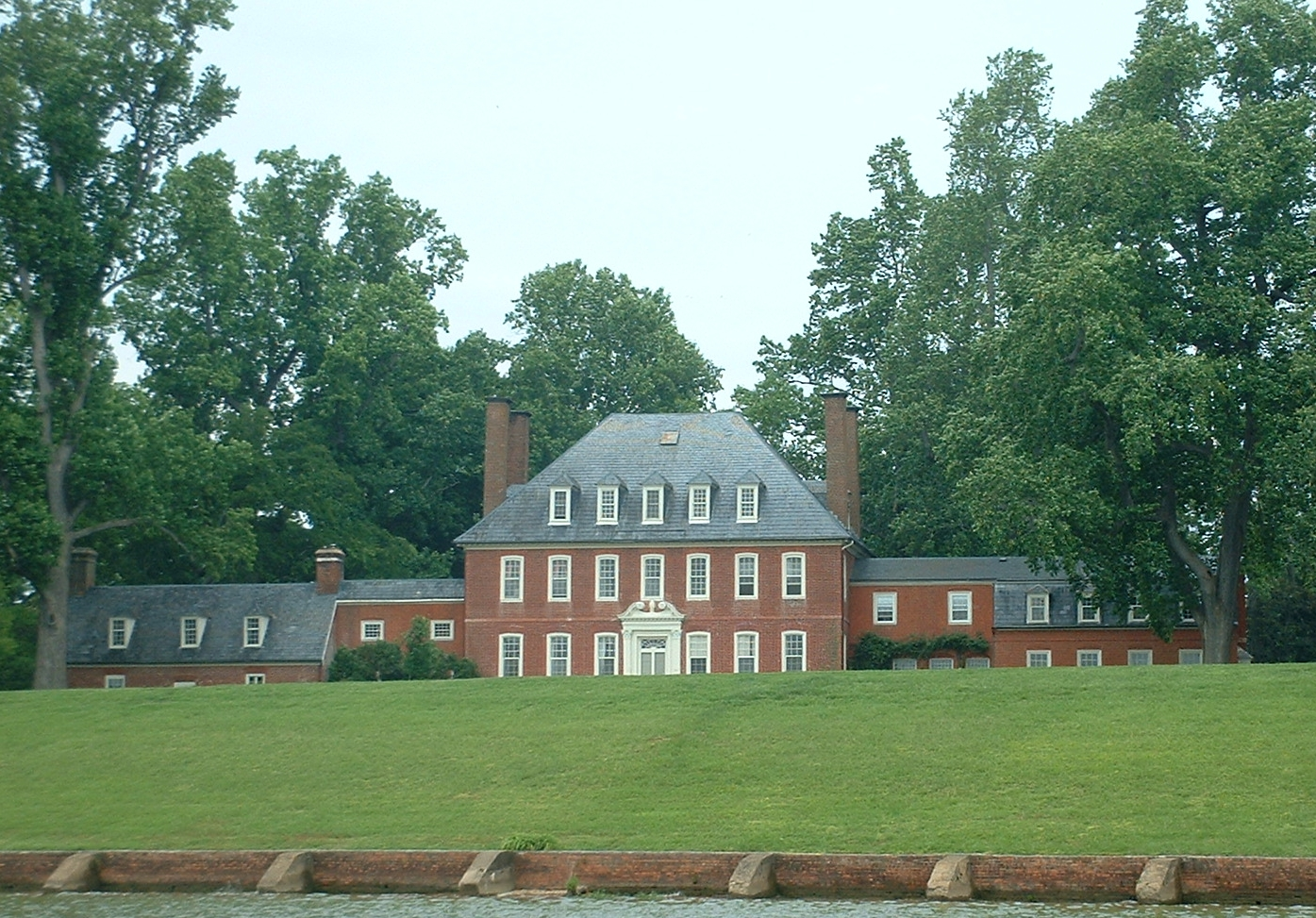
- Westover from the front (river) side

- Location within Virginia Location within the United States
- Interactive map showing the location of Westover Plantation
- Location: 7 mi. W of Charles City on VA 5, Charles City County, Virginia, United States of America
- Coordinates: 37°18′40″N 77°8′58″W
- Area: 1,025 acres (4.15 km^{2})
- Built: c. 1750
- Architectural style: Georgian
- NRHP reference No.: 66000923
- VLR No.: 018-0027

Significant dates
- Added to NRHP: October 15, 1966
- Designated NHL: October 9, 1960
- Designated VLR: September 9, 1969

Westover Plantation is a historic colonial tidewater plantation located on the north bank of the James River in Charles City County, Virginia, United States. Established c. 1730–1750, it is the homestead of the Byrd family of Virginia. State Route 5, a scenic byway, runs east–west to the north of the plantation, connecting the independent cities of Richmond and Williamsburg.

The plantation has been designated as a National Historic Landmark in the United States, cited for the architectural quality of its early Georgian mansion house and the history of its influential family. In the early years of the Virginia colony, the plantation was one of the sites of the courts of Charles City County.

== History ==
Sir John Pawlett, by deeds of lease and release, demised most of Westover Plantation in 1665 to Theodorick Bland of Westover for £170. Bland lived on the property until his death in 1671 and was buried in the chancel of the original Westover Church, which he helped build. His eldest son, Theodorick, inherited the land and joined with his brother, Richard, in its ownership. The brothers eventually conveyed 1,200 acres of the property to William Byrd I in 1688 for £300 and 10,000 pounds of tobacco and cask.

The plantation is notable for its 18th-century and later history. The mansion, Westover Plantation, was built in the Georgian style. It was considered the seat of the William Byrd family in Virginia. William Byrd II, the founder of Richmond, was thought to have built the mansion c. 1730 and designed by architect Richard Taliaferro. This date was part of the 1960 designation of the house as a National Historic Landmark.

But, since the late 20th century, recent dendrochronologic testing on boards and planks in the house showed that they dated to the 1750s. The house was thus probably built and first occupied by William Byrd III, not his father. The revised construction date has been recognized by the National Park Service.

Like the other plantations along the James River, Westover was first devoted to the cultivation of tobacco, the major commodity of colonial Tidewater Virginia. The Byrd family depended on the labor of hundreds of enslaved Africans, as tobacco was a labor-intensive crop. The original grounds included slave quarters. In addition to working as field hands, other slaves worked as domestic servants and skilled artisans of many types. Tobacco cultivation exhausted the soil and, pushed also by changes in markets, in the 19th century planters shifted to mixed crops, which were less labor-intensive. As development of the Deep South ensued, planters in the Upper South sold "excess" slaves in the domestic slave trade, which continued to the Civil War.

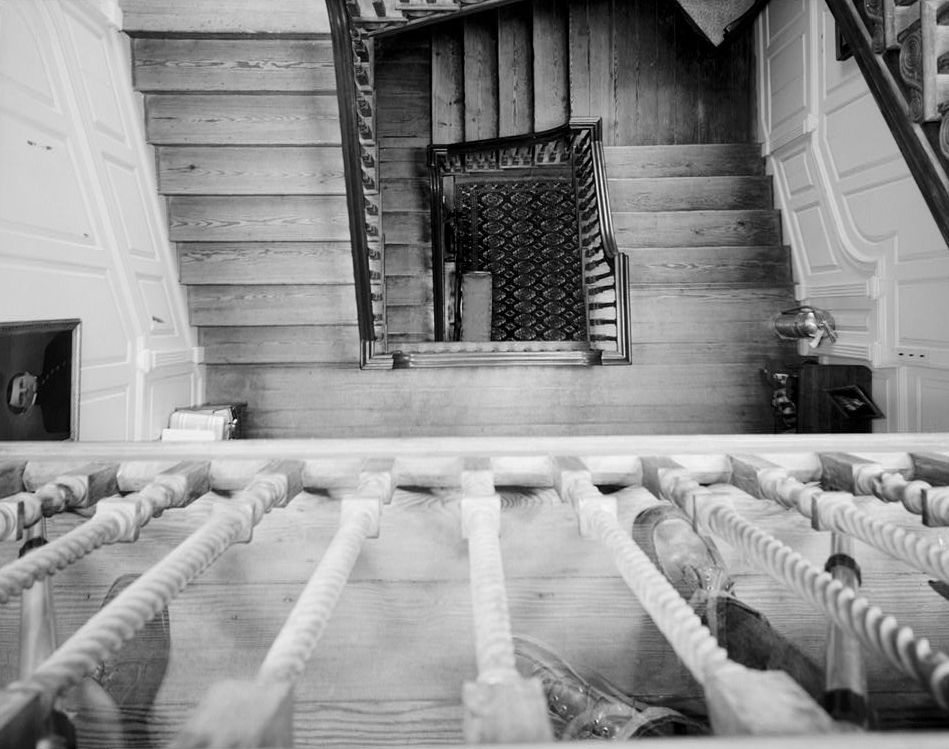
Interior view, downward in main stairway, Westover Plantation

During the American Civil War, Westover was used as headquarters of the Union Fifth Corps and one of the wings burned during this time. After the death of William Byrd III's widow in 1814, Westover was sold out of the Byrd family. Since then, Westover has had three subsequent owners, including lawyer John Armistead Selden (a member of the Selden family and the Lee family), whose detailed diaries of daily life at Westover remain in publication as a popular primary source on the economic and cultural history of nineteenth-century Virginian agriculture, and Confederate Army officer Augustus Harrison Drewry. Drewry, who is best known for commanding the gun batteries of Fort Darling during Battle of Drewry's Bluff in 1862, lived at Westover until his death in 1899 and made many changes; including rebuilding the burned wing, connecting the dependencies and enlarging the dining room so that it ran the depth of the house.

In the early 20th century, Westover was acquired by United States diplomat Richard Teller Crane, II, who restored the mansion and grounds. It has remained in the Crane family ever since. The site was damaged by Hurricane Isabel in 2003. Ten feet of riverbank, a 250-year-old road, and a 150-year-old poplar from the south lawn were eroded into the river during the storm.

== Architecture ==
The house is noteworthy for its symmetry and balance of proportions, secret passages, and Georgian style. The grounds and garden are open to the public from 9 a.m. to 6 p.m. daily, and tours are arranged by appointment.

== Popular culture ==
The exterior of Westover was used in the pilot episode of "The West Wing" as the home of fictional White House Chief of Staff Leo McGarry.

Westover Plantation has been used as a filming location for the TV miniseries John Adams (2008), the drama series Turn (2014–2017), and the film The Field of Lost Shoes (2014).

== See also ==
- List of James River plantations
- List of National Historic Landmarks in Virginia
- National Register of Historic Places listings in Charles City County, Virginia
