= First Families of Virginia =

Socially prominent families in colonial Virginia

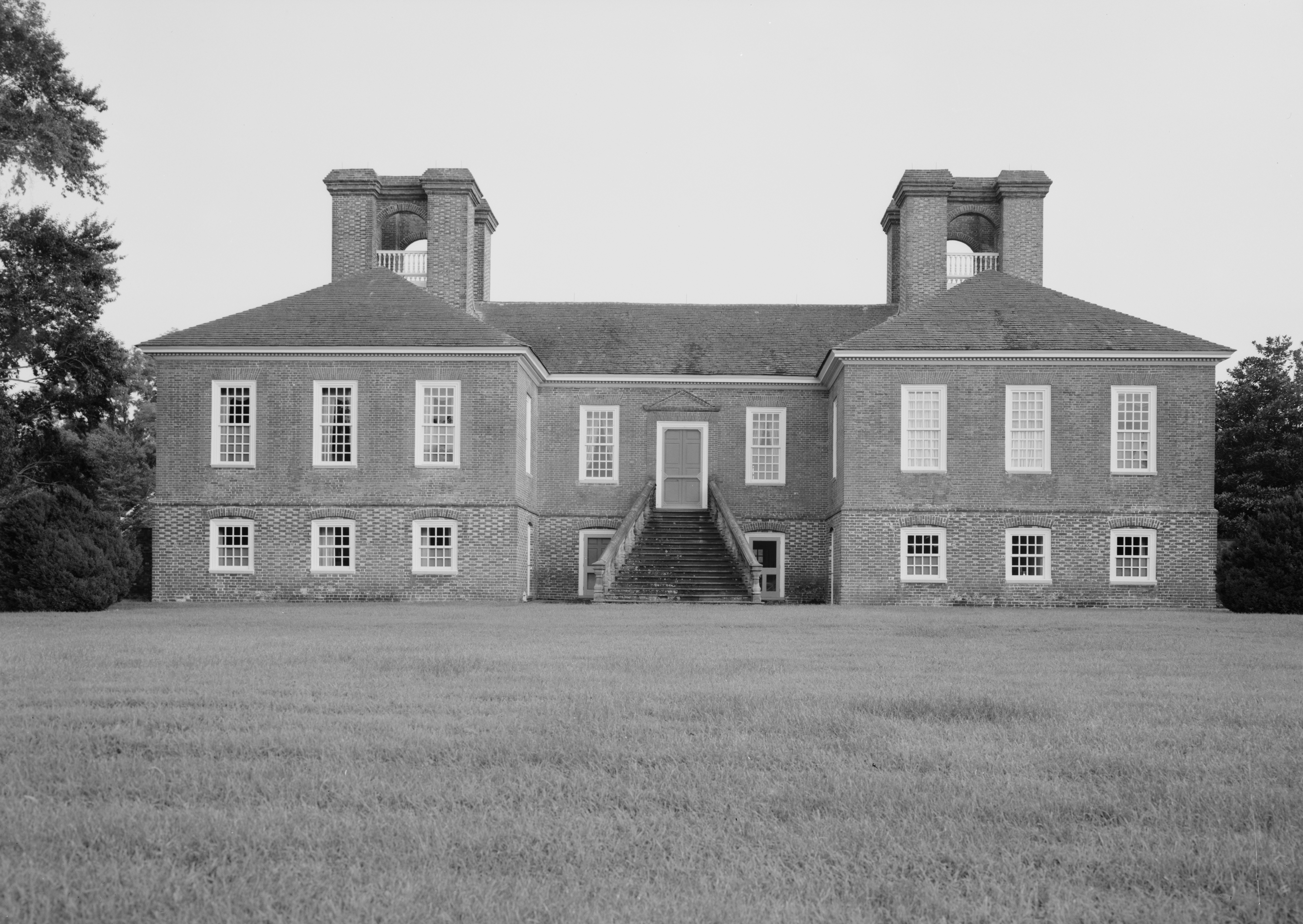
View of the main façade of Stratford Hall in Westmoreland County, the ancestral home of the Lee family of Virginia. Along with the Byrds, Carters, Washingtons, Harrisons and others, these families were at the core of Virginia's plantocracy for centuries.

The First Families of Virginia (FFV) are a group of early white American settler families who became a socially, culturally, and politically dominant group in the Colony of Virginia, of the British Thirteen Colonies and later on the present day Commonwealth of Virginia, of the United States of America. The first families of Virginia also descend from European colonists, specifically the British colonists who primarily settled at Jamestown, Williamsburg, the Northern Neck and along the James River and other navigable waters in Virginia during the 17th century. These elite families generally married within their social class for many generations and, as a result, most surnames of First Families date back to the US colonial period.

The American Revolution cut many of the FFV's ties with Great Britain, despite this, some of the First Family members of Virginia were well known American loyalists to Great Britain, whereas others were American patriots (or Whigs) who supported and often took leading roles in the Revolution. Most First Families remained in Virginia, where they flourished as tobacco planters, and from the sale of slaves to the cotton states of the American South. Though most younger sons of the First Families who migrated west did so to Kentucky or Tennessee, some younger sons of the First Families some relocated into the Cotton Belt to start their own plantations. With the emancipation of slaves during the American Civil War and the consequential loss of slave labor, the FFV’s plantations struggled to turn a profit.

The First Families, albeit poorer than before, maintained social and political leadership in Virginia through the late 19th and early 20th centuries, adopting modern agricultural technology and coopting rich "Yankees" (people from the American North) into their upper-class, rural horse-estate society. However, mirroring the path of other White Anglo-Saxon Protestant social groups in the United States, the political and financial influence of the First Families in Virginia also suffered a decline in the 20th century.

== British heritage, second sons ==
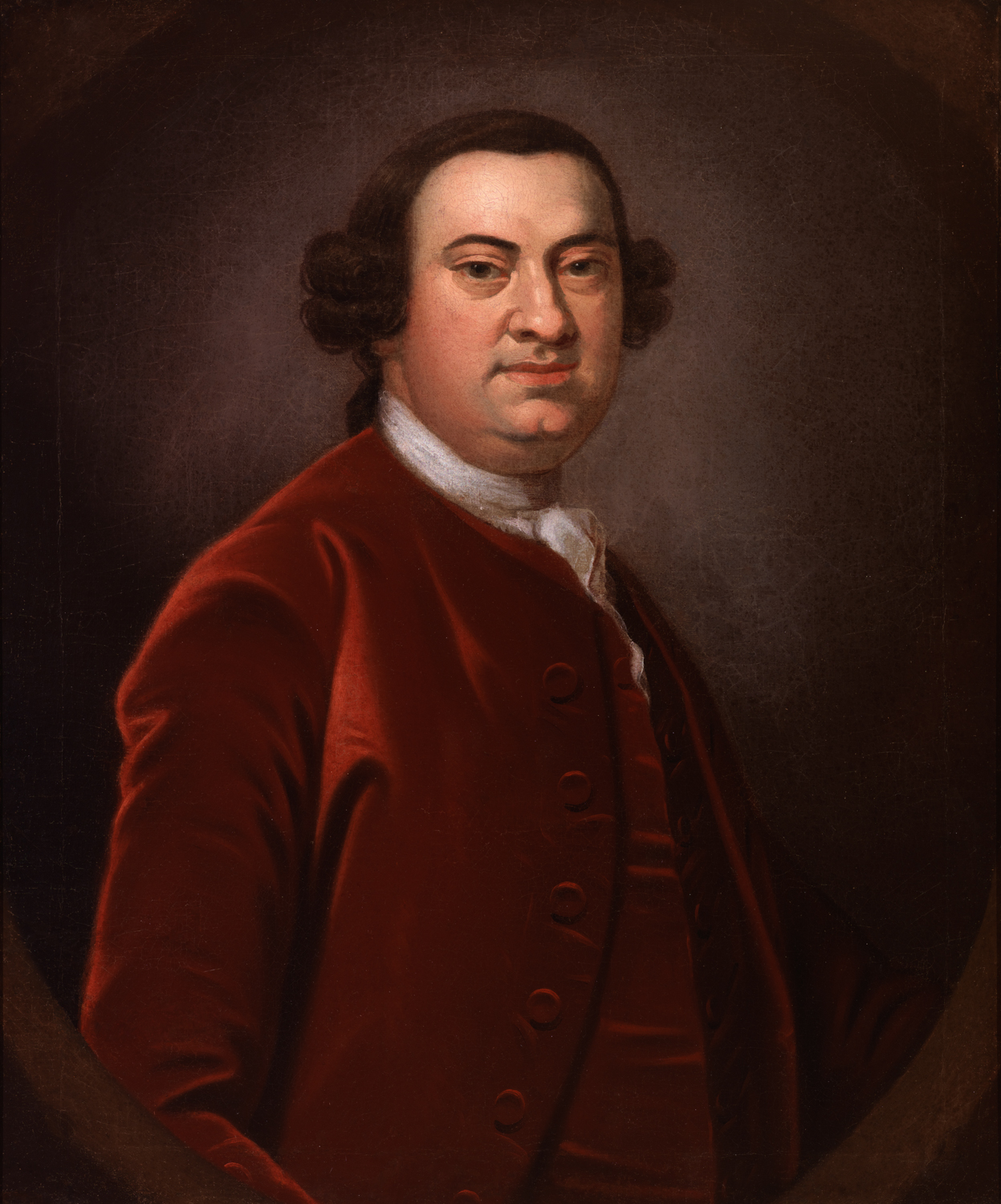
Mann Page II of Rosewell, painted by John Wollaston. The Rosewell plantation was called one of the "finest homes in colonial America" and built of bricks imported from England (Great Britain).

The English colonists, later on the British colonists, who eventually became the First Families who had emigrated to the new Colony of Virginia, of the Thirteen Colonies. Their emigration took place from the settlement of Jamestown through the English Civil War and English Interregnum period (1642–1660). Some royalists had left England on the accession to power of Oliver Cromwell and his Roundheads. Because most of Virginia's leading families recognized Charles II as King following the execution of Charles I in 1649, Charles II reputedly called Virginia his "Old Dominion" – a nickname that endures today. The affinity of many early Virginia white settlers for the British Crown led to the term "distressed Cavaliers", often applied to the Virginia slavocracy. Some Cavaliers who served under King Charles I fled to Virginia. FFVs often refer to Virginia as "Cavalier Country". These men were offered land or other rewards by King Charles II, but most who had settled in Virginia stayed in Virginia.

Many such early white settlers in Virginia were called Second Sons. Primogeniture favored the first sons' inheriting lands and titles in England. Second or third sons went out to the colonies to make their fortune, or entered the military and the clergy. Tidewater Virginia evolved as a society descended from second or third sons of Englishmen who inherited land grants or land in Virginia. They formed part of what became the Southern colonial elite in Colonial America.

In some cases, longstanding ties among families in England were carried to the new colony, where they were reinforced by marriage and other relations. For instance, there were ancestral ties between the Spencer family of Bedfordshire and the Washington family; a Spencer secured the land grant later purchased by the Washingtons, where they built their Mount Vernon home. These sorts of ties were common in the early colony, as families shuttled back and forth between England and Virginia, maintaining their connections with the mother country and with each other.

A thin network of increasingly interrelated families made up the planter elite and held power in colonial Virginia. "As early as 1660, every seat on the ruling Council of Virginia was held by members of five interrelated families," writes British historian John Keegan, "and as late as 1775, every council member was descended from one of the 1660 councillors."

The ties among white colonial Virginia families were based on marriage among each other. In a pre-Revolutionary War economy dependent on the production of tobacco as a commodity crop, the ownership of the best land was tightly controlled. It often passed between families of corresponding social rank. The Virginia economy was based on slave labor as the colony became a slave society. The landed gentry could keep tight rein on political power, which passed in somewhat orderly fashion from family to family. (In the more modern mercantile economy of the north, social mobility became more prominent. The power of the elite was muted by newcomers who gained wealth in the market economy.)

== Pocahontas ==
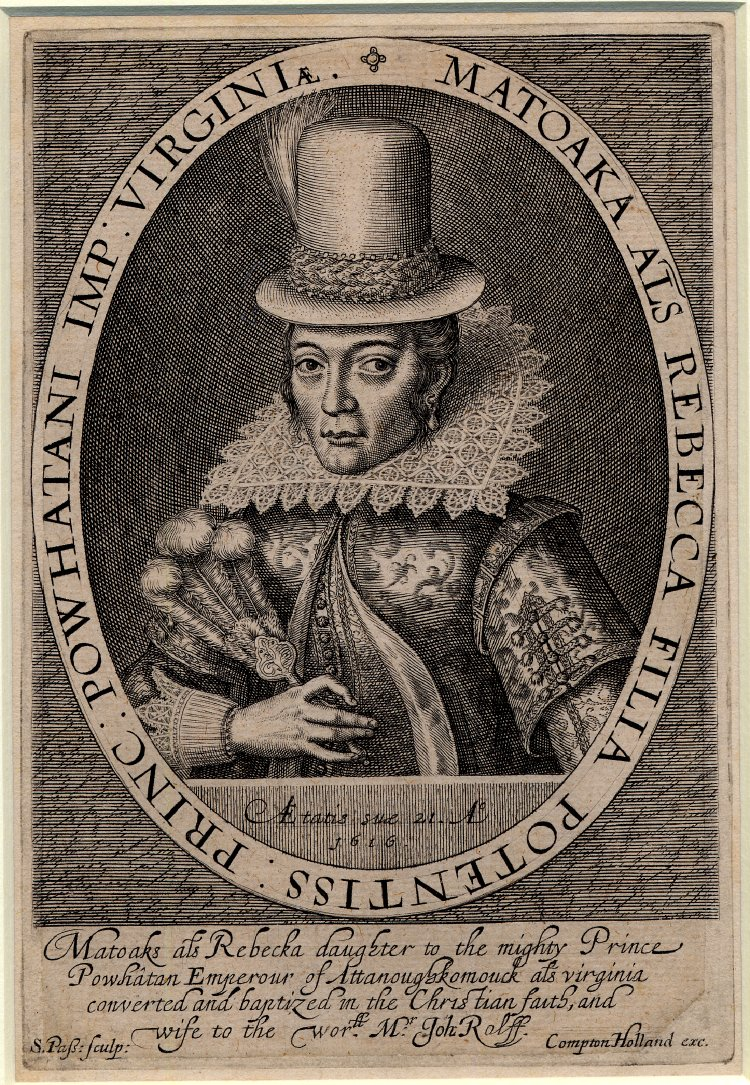
Pocahontas by Simon de Passe

Pocahontas (1595–1617), an American Indian woman, was daughter of Chief Powhatan, founder of the Powhatan Confederacy. According to Mattaponi and Patawomeck tradition, Pocahontas was previously married to a Patawomeck weroance, Kocoum, who was killed by Englishmen when Samuel Argall abducted her on April 13, 1613. She was educated among the English settlers of Virginia and converted to Christianity during her captivity in Henricus. Pocahontas married English colonist John Rolfe at a church in Jamestown on April 5, 1614. Rolfe had become prominent and wealthy as the first to successfully develop an export cash crop for the colony with new varieties of tobacco. Their only child, Thomas Rolfe, was born on January 30, 1615. He married and had a family: his descendants married into other elite families.

Pocahontas was much celebrated in London, where she was welcomed with great ceremony at the Royal Court. She died young but became legendary as the first Native American from Virginia to assimilate into western culture, become Christian, marry an Englishman, and bear a known child from such a marriage (there were no doubt mixed-race children born to lower-class European colonists and Algonquian women, although they may have been neither married nor Christian). She became an important symbol of friendly Native American-English colonial relations of the Jamestown colony. By virtue of many fictional accounts, her marriage was romanticized and became part of the mythology of early US history.

Crucially, Pocahontas became a focal point in all First Family genealogies. So great was the importance of Pocahontas in these family trees that, upon the passage of the Racial Integrity Act of 1924, First Family lobbying resulted in the "Pocahontas Exception", which allowed white people who claimed Native American descent to circumvent the racial Act's one-drop rule and remain classified as white.

== Organizing the First Families ==
In 1887, following the Reconstruction era after the Civil War, Virginia Governor Wyndham Robertson wrote the first history of Pocahontas and her descendants, delineating the ancestry of First Families including the Bollings, Clements, Whittles, Blands, Skipwiths, Flemings, Catletts, Gays, Jordans, Randolphs, Tazewells, and many others. Excluded from this history were 'natural children', mixed-race descendants of unions with slaves.

Families often used surnames as given names, as in the "Johns" of Johns Hopkins University, or where a surname might die out because the last holder only had daughters, Cole Digges was the grandson of William Cole. A mother's maiden name might also be used as a middle name, to document that part of the person's ancestry; or even middle and first as is the case with John Tayloe Lomax, John Tayloe Washington, and John Tayloe Corbin. For example, Lt. Col. Powhatan Bolling Whittle of the 38th Virginia Infantry, Confederate States Army was an uncle of Matoaka Whittle Sims.

In 1907, the Jamestown Exposition was held near Norfolk to celebrate the tricentennial of the arrival of the first English colonists and the founding of Jamestown. Preservation Virginia, formerly known as the Association for the Preservation of Virginia Antiquities, was founded in Williamsburg in 1889 to memorialize Virginia history. In the 20th century, Preservation Virginia emphasized patriotism by highlighting the Founding Fathers that hailed from Virginia.

To commemorate the 350th anniversary of the first settlement at Jamestown, the Order of First Families of Virginia published genealogies compiled by Annie Lash Jester (a Fellow of the American Society of Genealogists) and Martha Woodroff Hiden in 1956. The same pair published a second addition in 1964 (also during Virginia's Massive Resistance crisis). The third edition was compiled and edited by Virginia M. Meyer (1974-1981) and John Federick Dorman (1981-1987). The fourth and current edition, in three volumes published between 2004 (vol.1) and 2007 (vol.3)by Baltimore's Genealogical Publishing Company in collaboration with the Order of First Families of Virginia.

== Notable families ==
Some notable family names include:

- Ashford
- Allen
- Allerton
- Archer
- Bacon
- Baskerville
- Belcher
- Bentley
- Berkeley
- Beverley
- Billingsley
- Blackman
- Blair
- Blackwell
- Bland
- Bolling
- Branch
- Braxton
- Browne
- Buckner
- Burwell
- Byrd
- Capps
- Carter
- Cary
- Childers
- Chiles
- Christian
- Cocke
- Conway
- Custis
- Dalton
- Dameron/Damron
- Dandridge
- Eldridge
- Fairfax
- Farrar
- Fitzhugh
- Gooch
- Graves
- Hatfield
- Harris
- Harrison
- Hill
- Hopkins
- Howell
- Jameson
- Jefferson
- Jenings
- Lee
- Madison
- Marshall
- Mathews
- McLean
- Nelson
- Norvell
- Omohundro
- Pace
- Page
- Payne
- Prewitt
- Randolph
- Robinson
- Rolfe
- Saunders
- Scrivener
- Selden
- Sharp
- Shifflett
- Skillern
- Spencer
- Stagner
- Stanton
- Starnes
- Stith
- Taliaferro
- Tayloe
- Taylor
- Terrell
- Tucker
- Waller
- Warner
- Warren
- Washington
- West
- Wormeley

== Portrait gallery ==
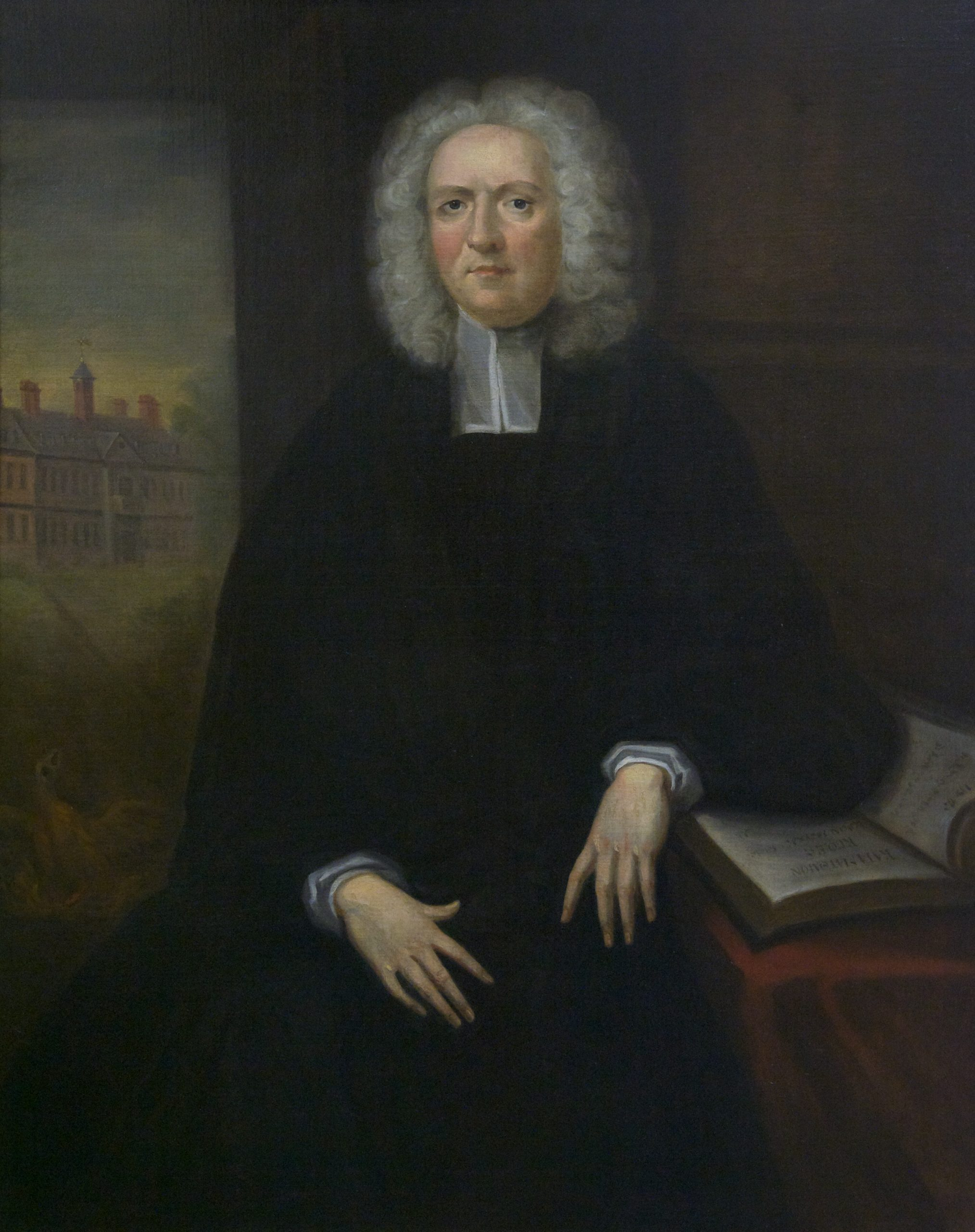
James Blair

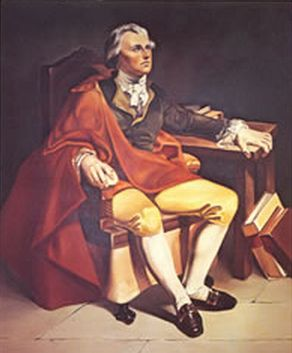
Richard Bland

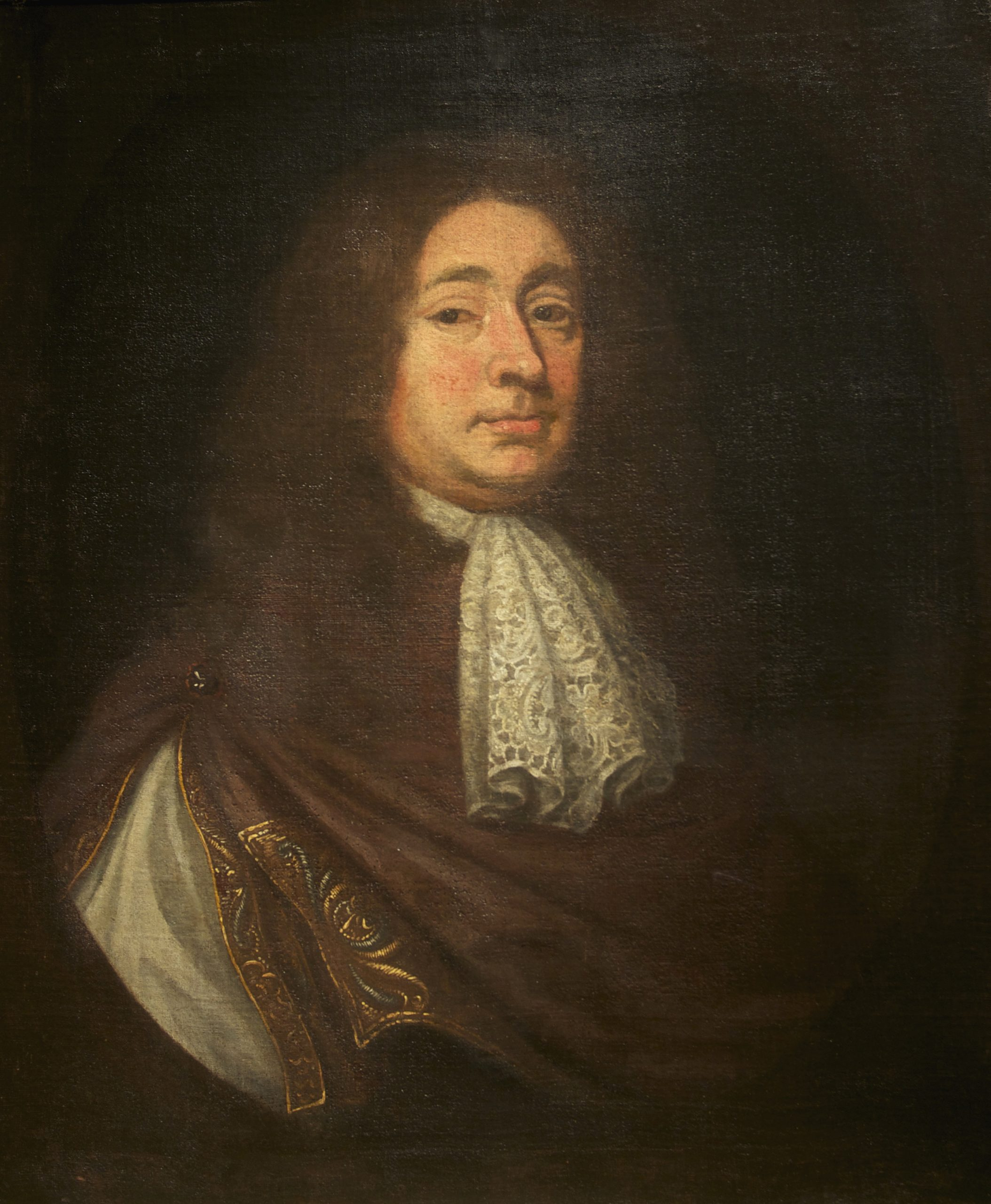
Robert Bolling

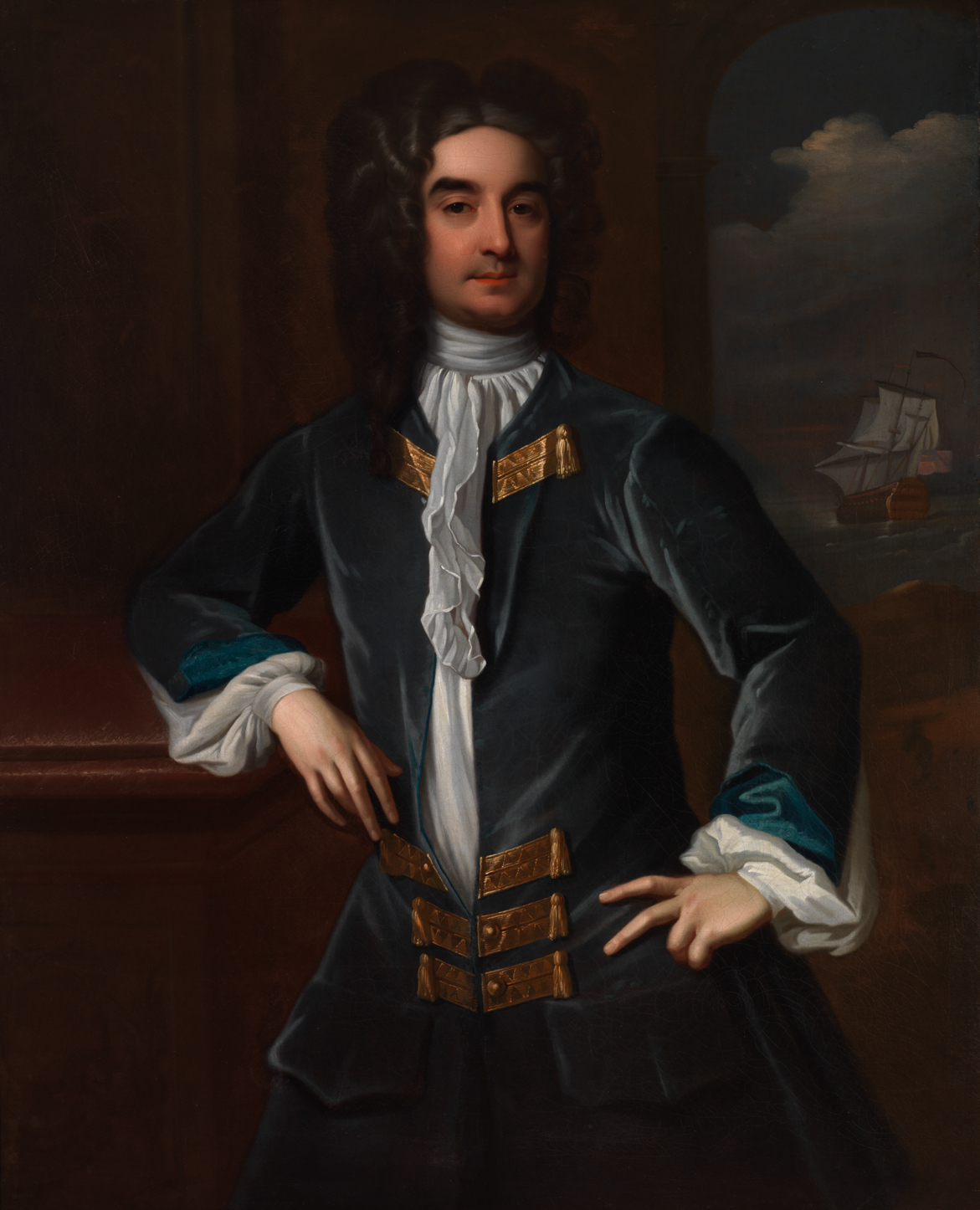
William Byrd II

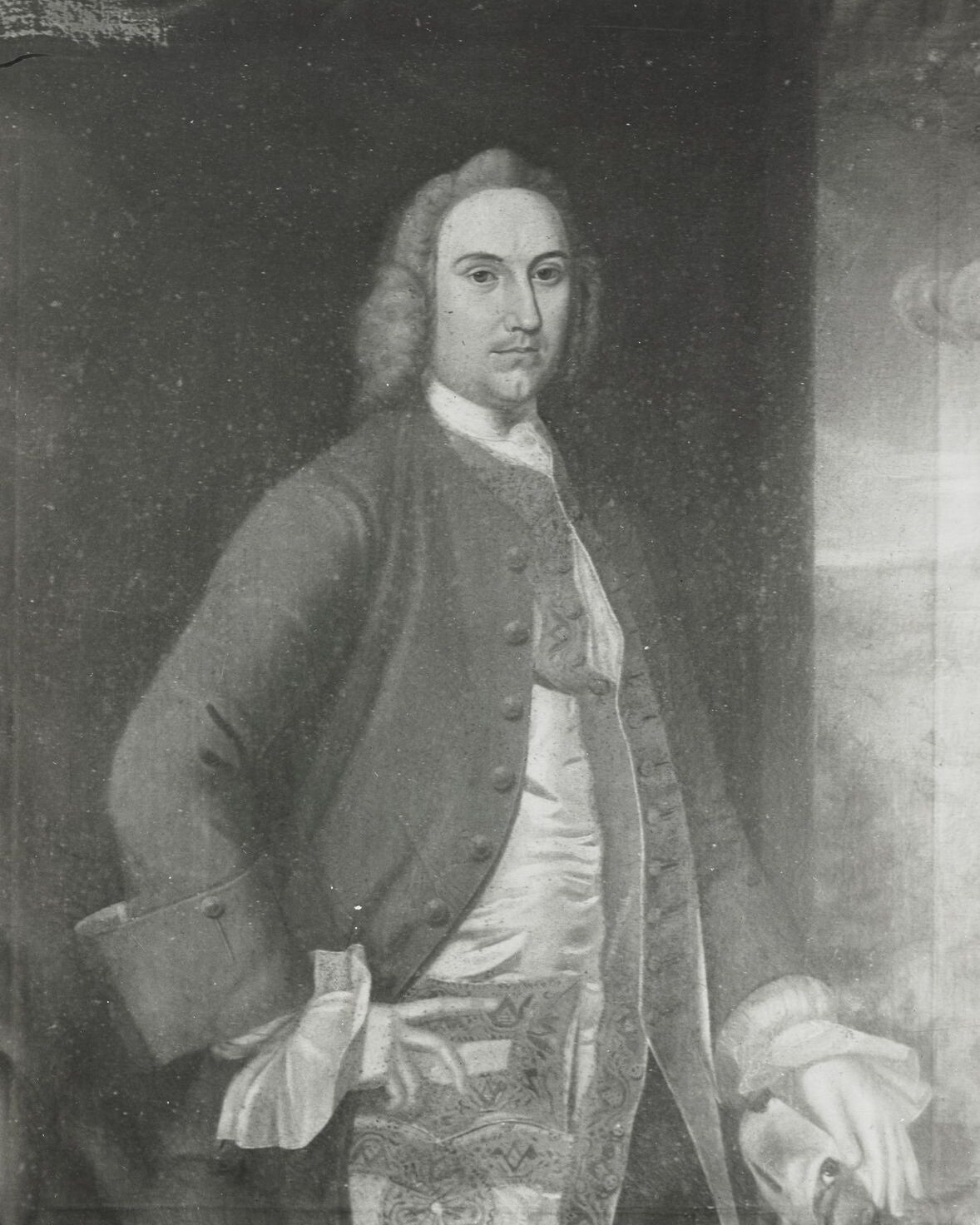
Landon Carter

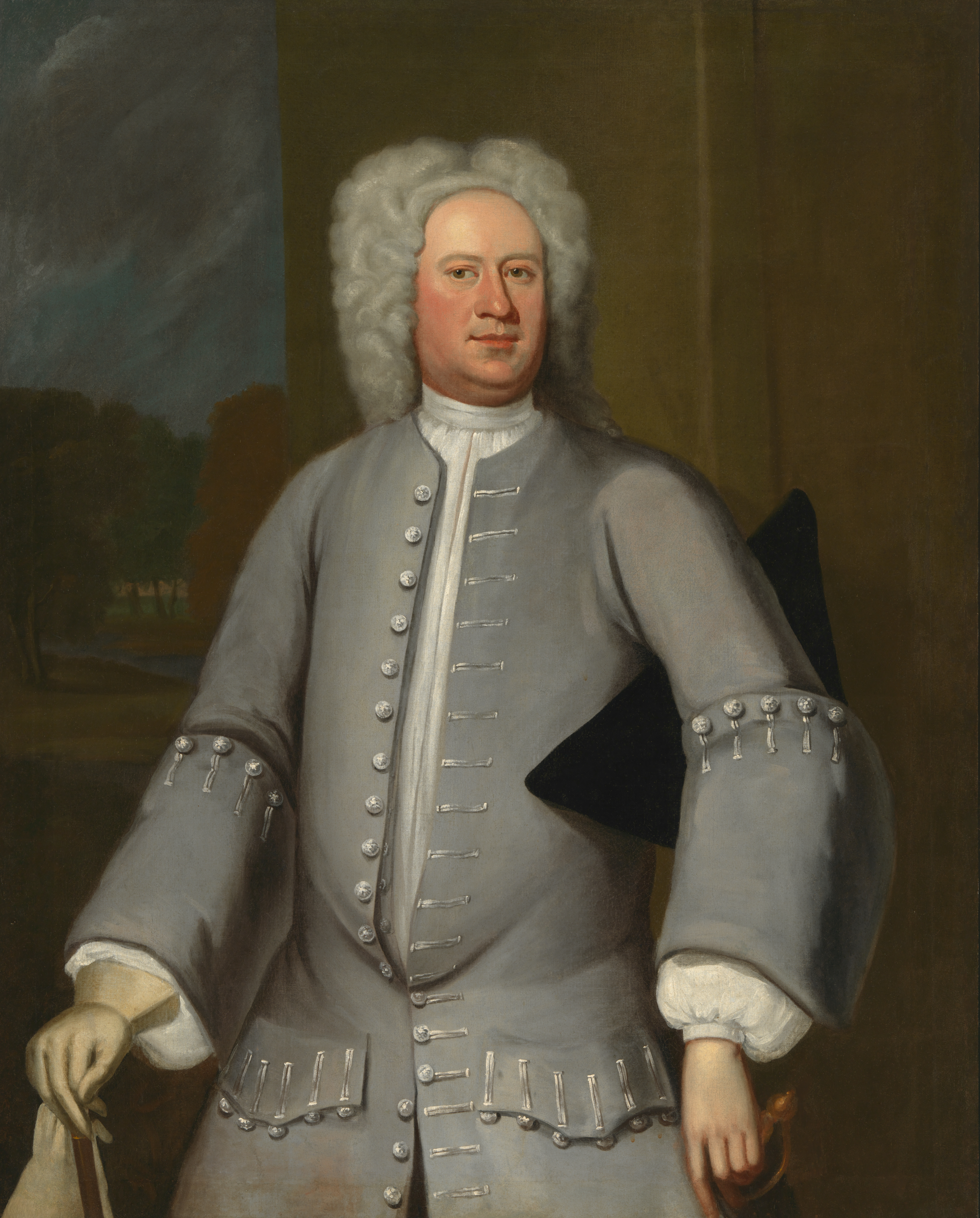
Robert Carter I

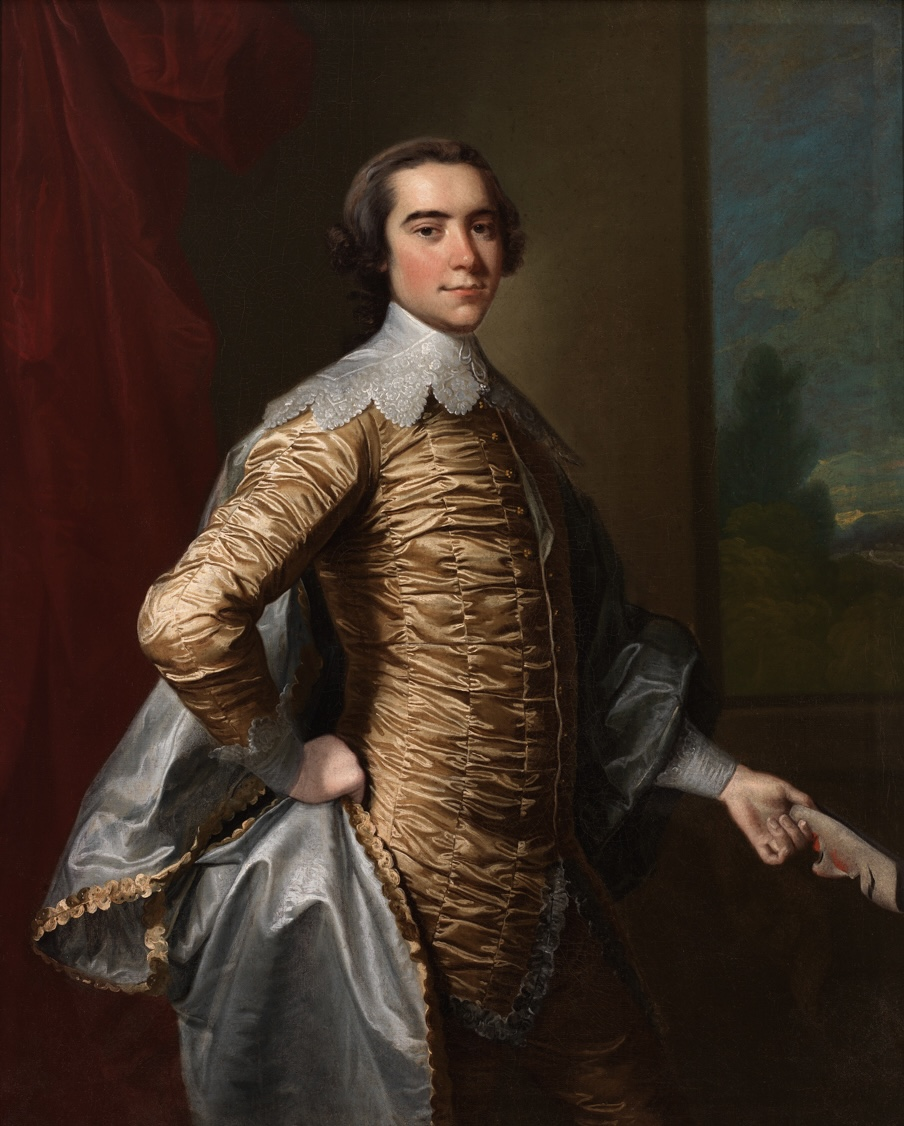
Robert Carter III

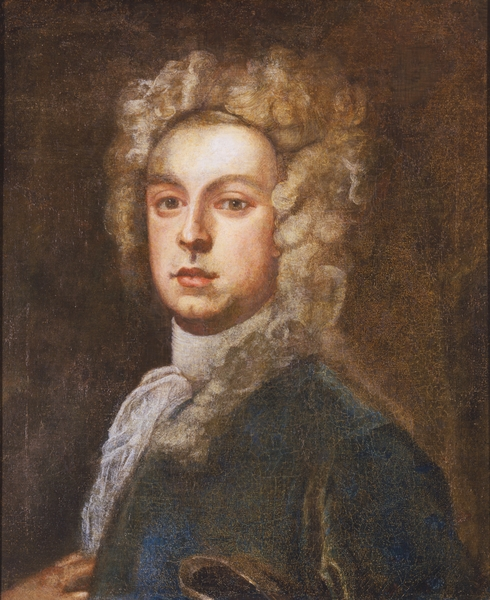
John Dandridge

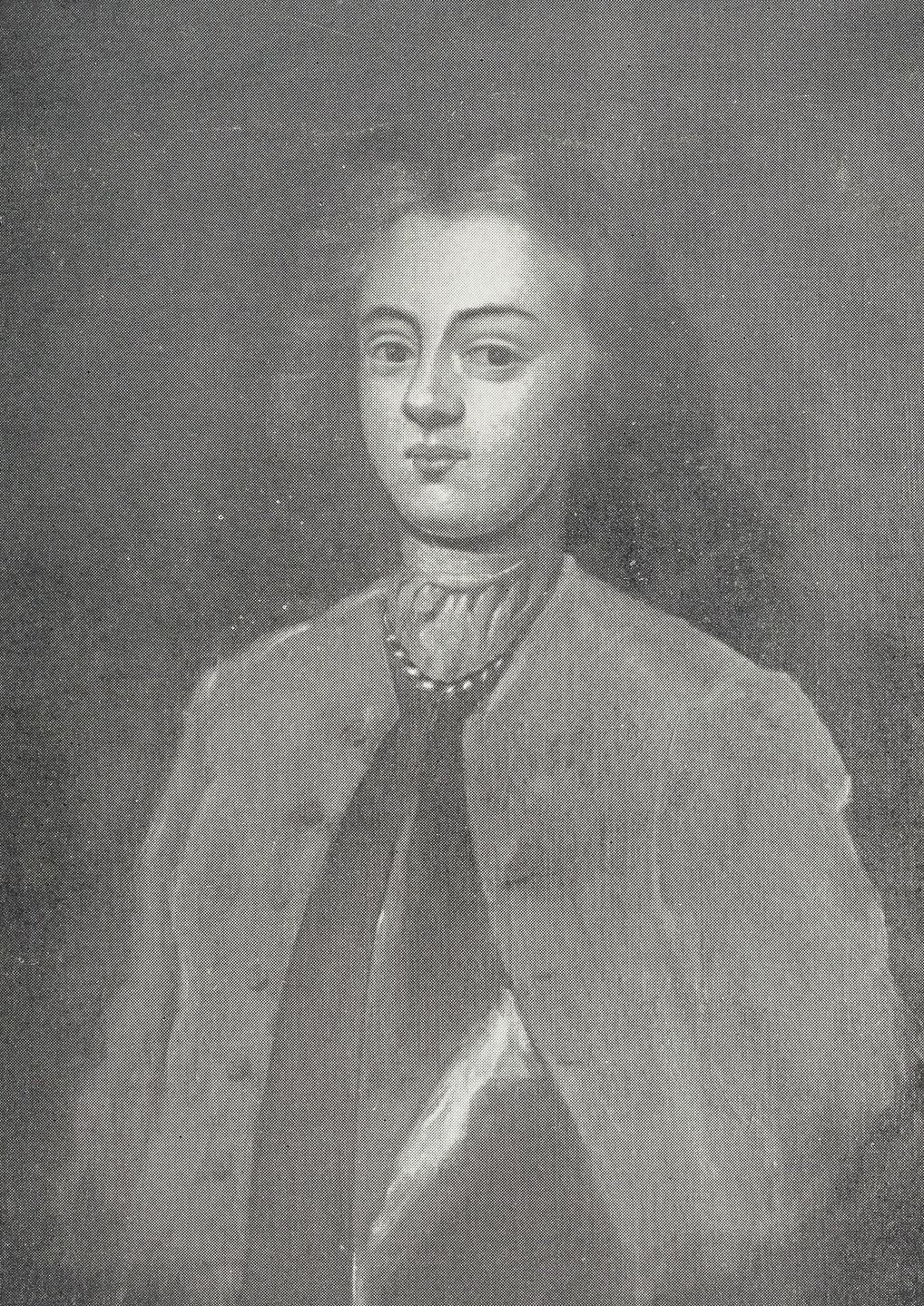
William Fairfax

William Fitzhugh

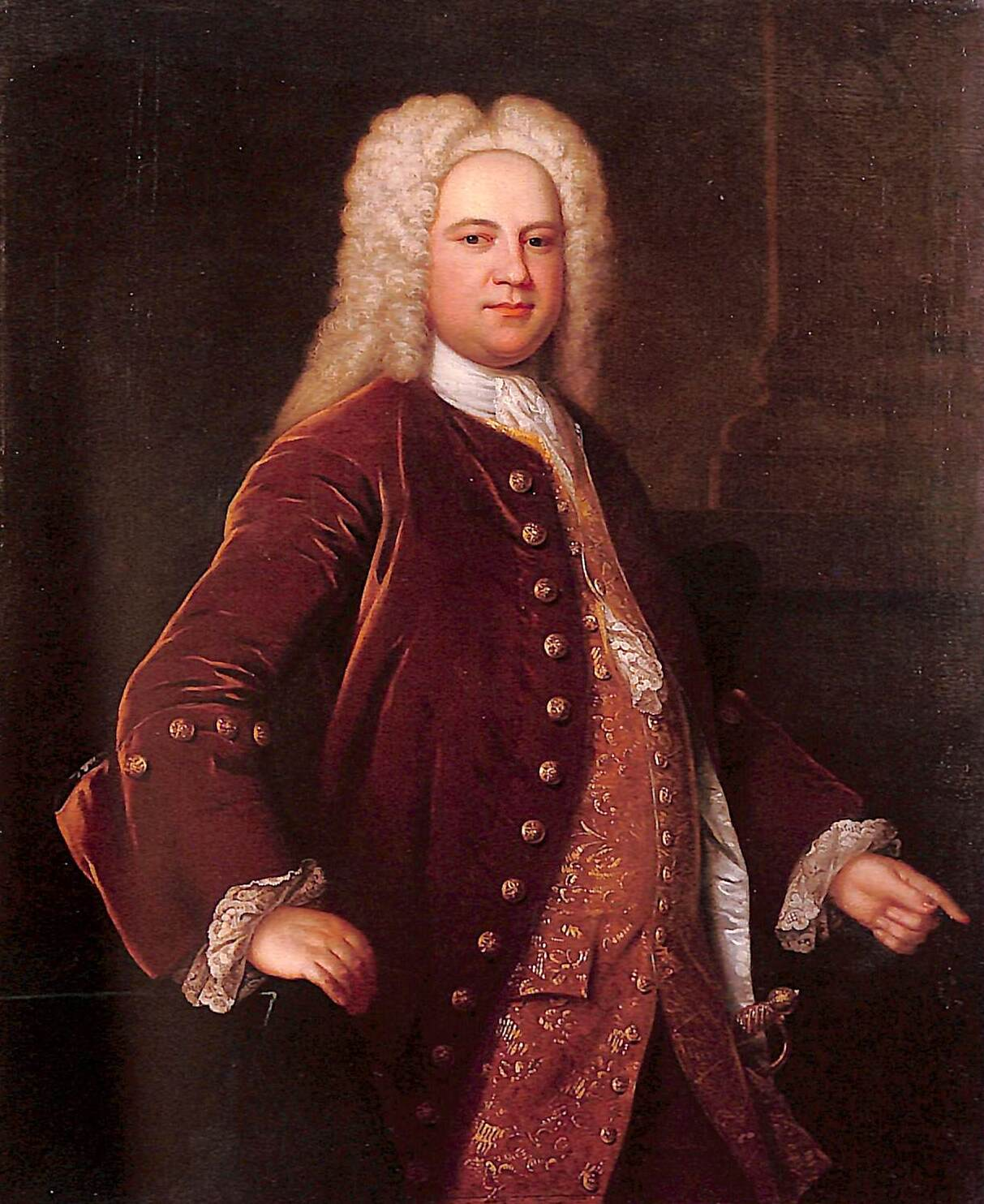
Sir William Gooch

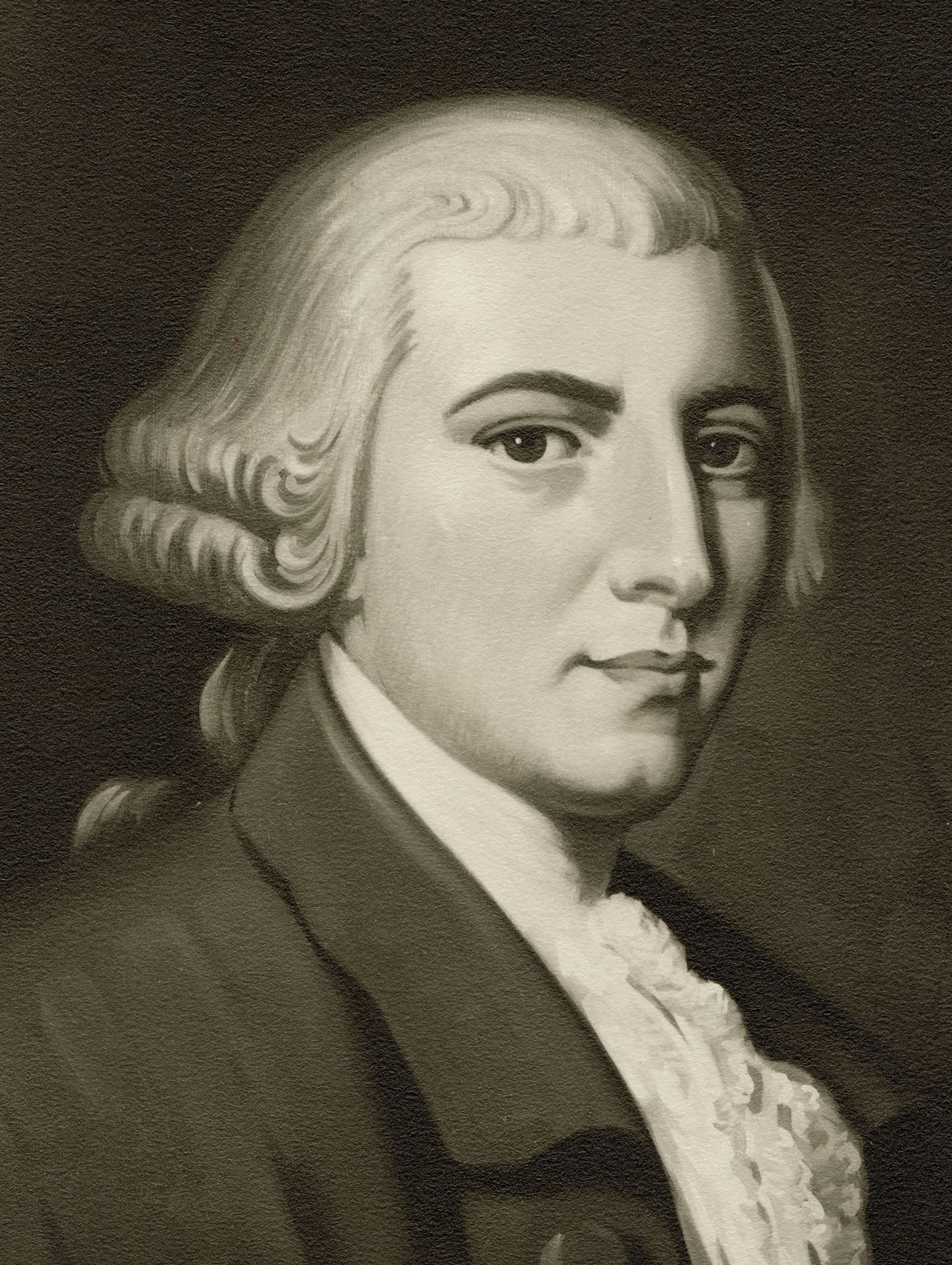
Benjamin Harrison V

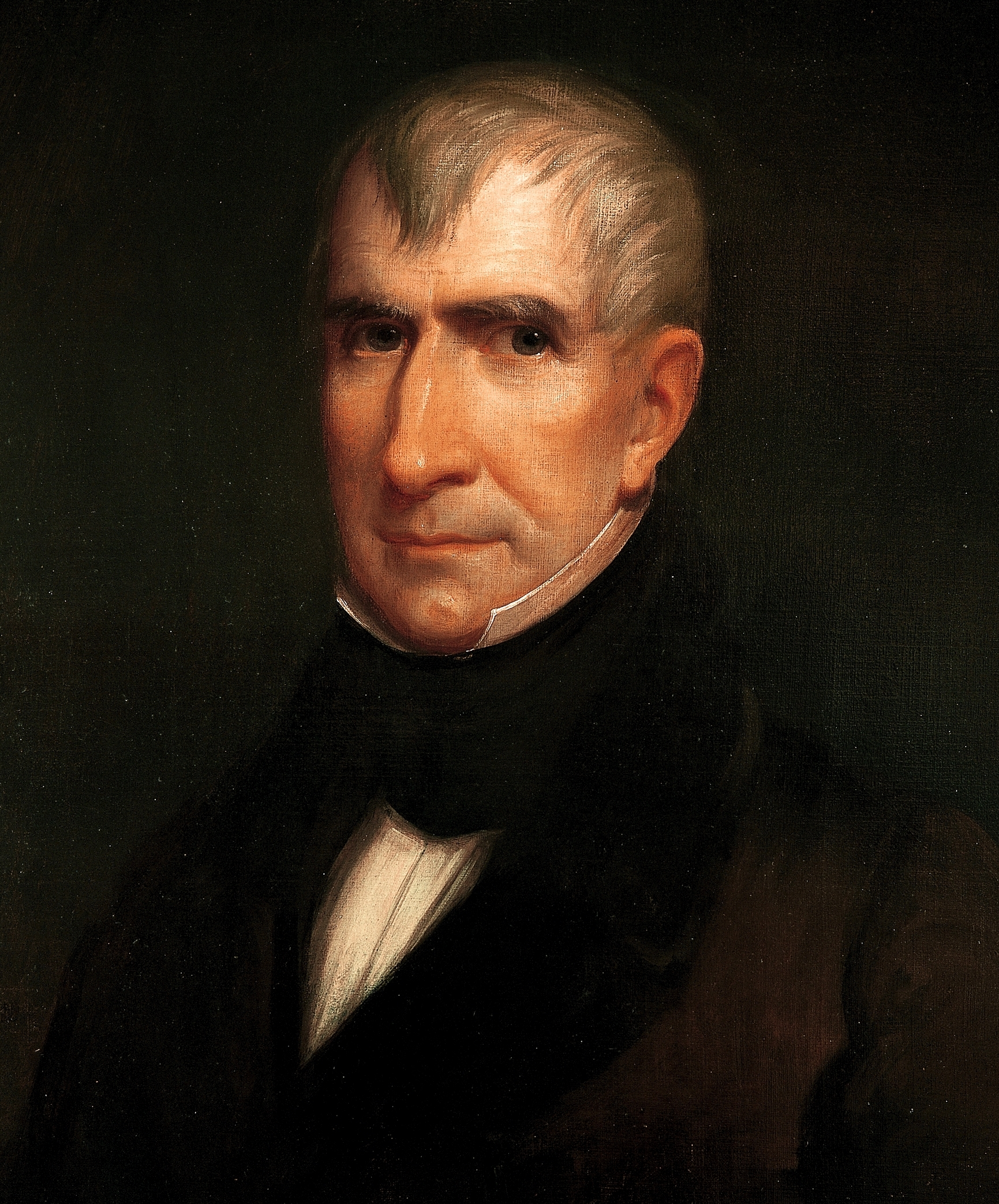
William Henry Harrison

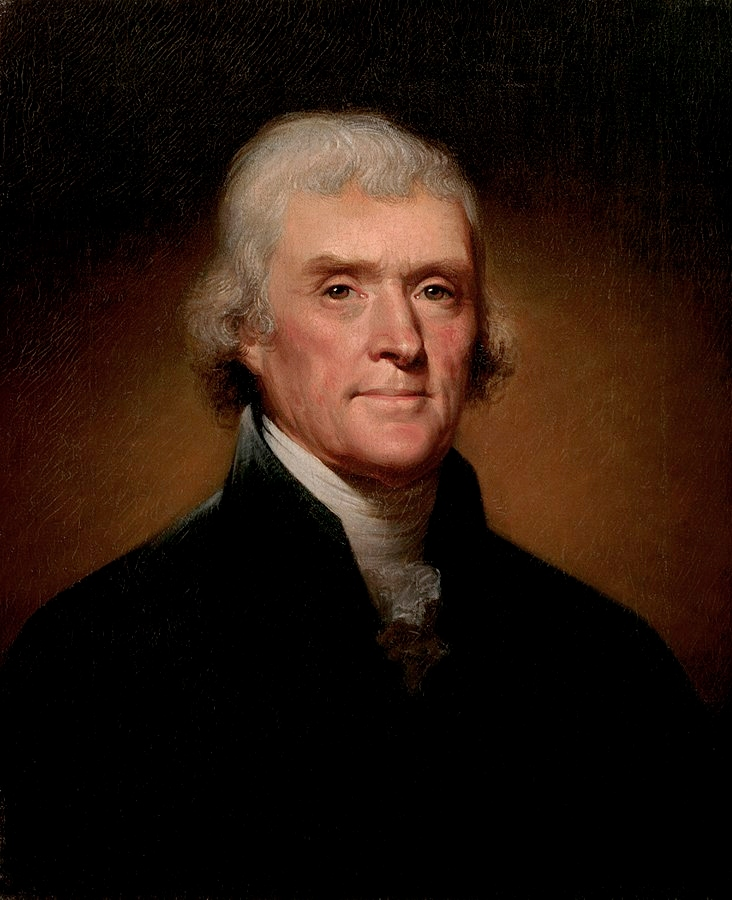
Thomas Jefferson

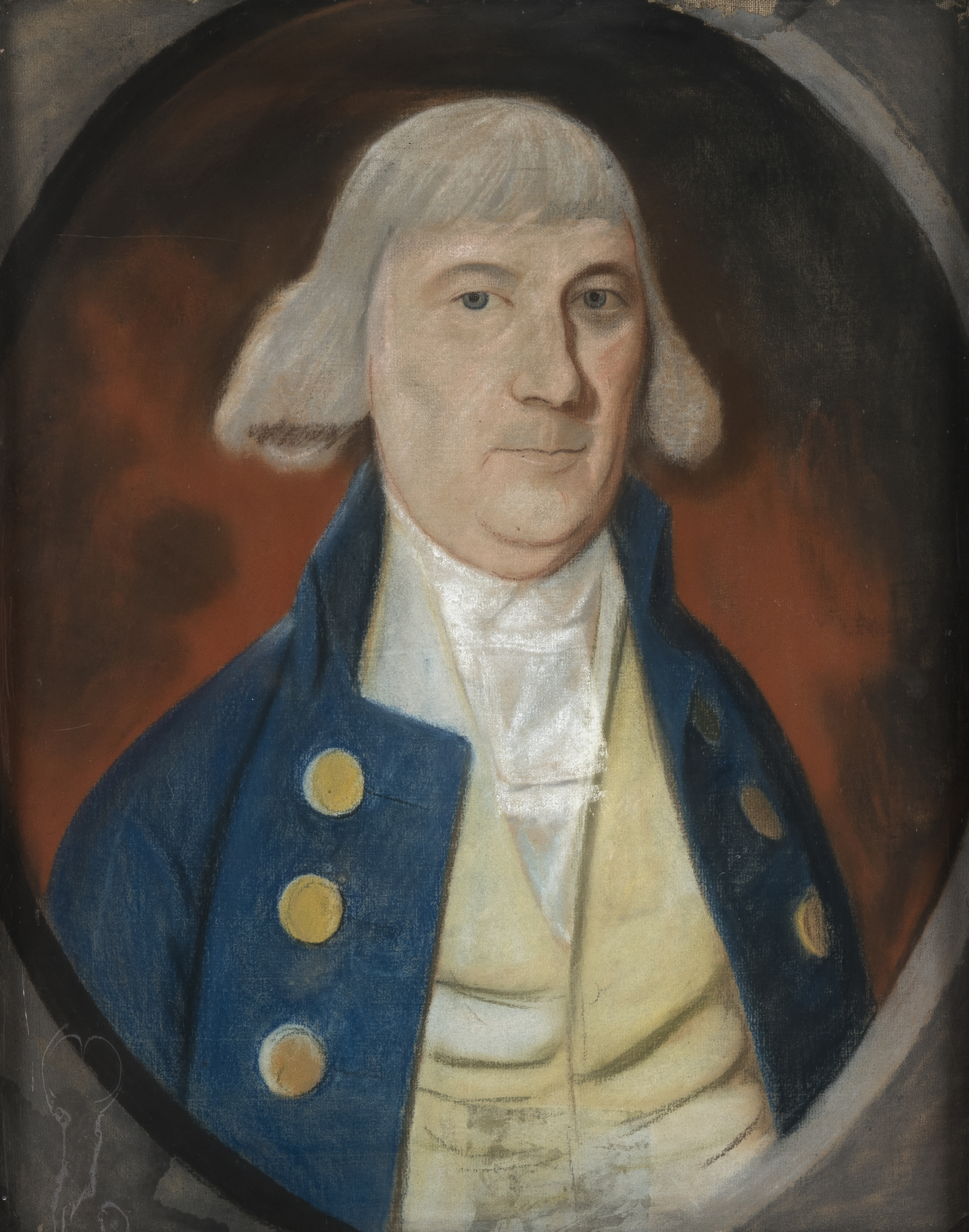
John Jameson

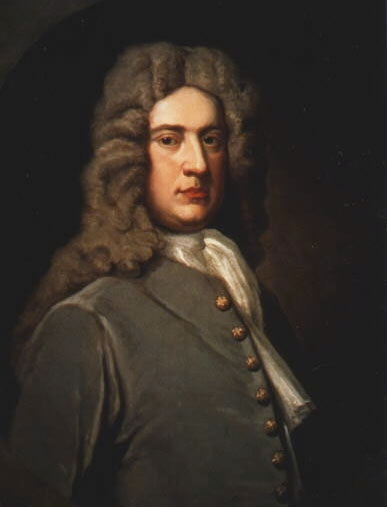
Richard Lee I

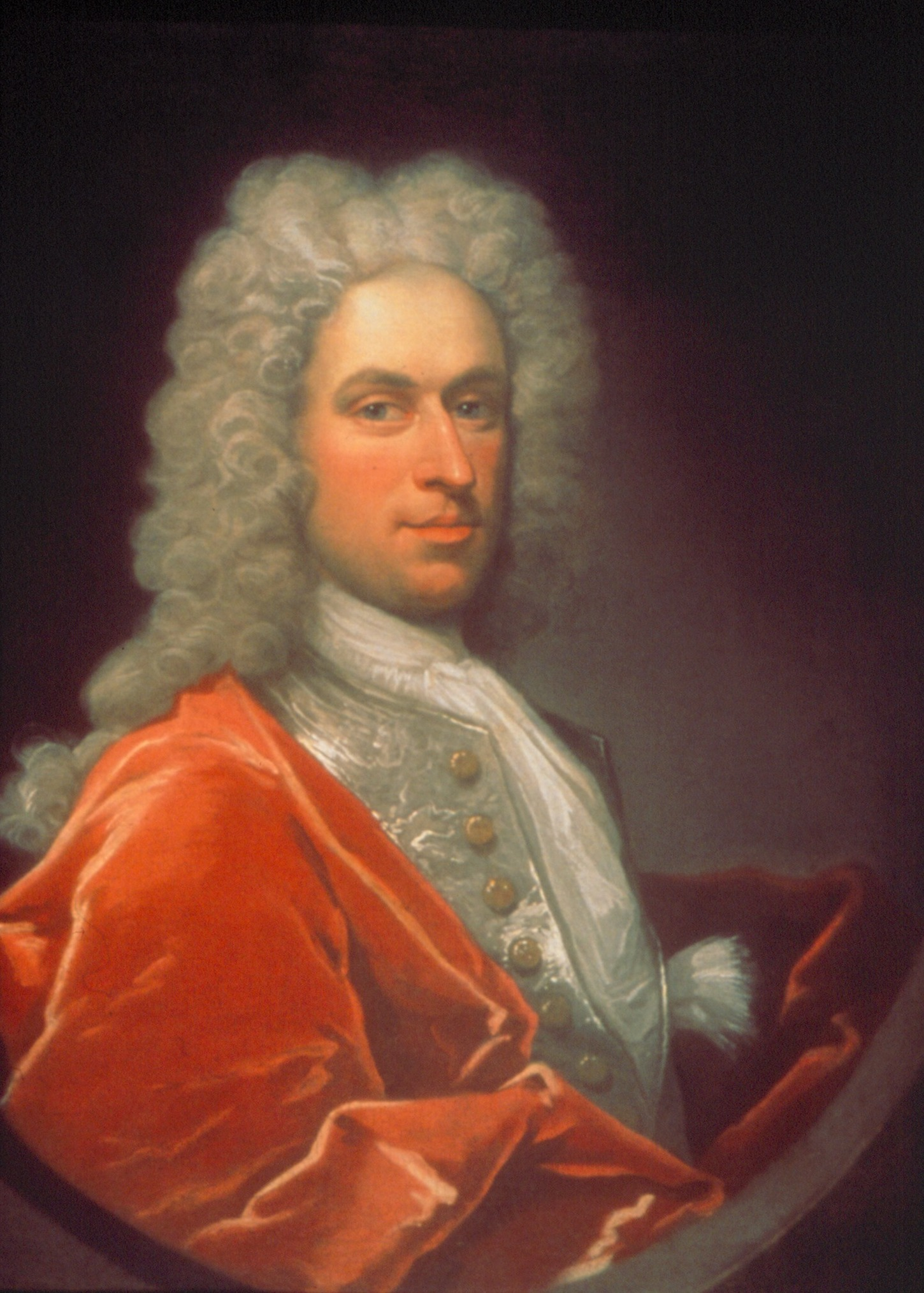
Thomas Lee

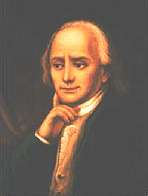
Francis Lightfoot Lee

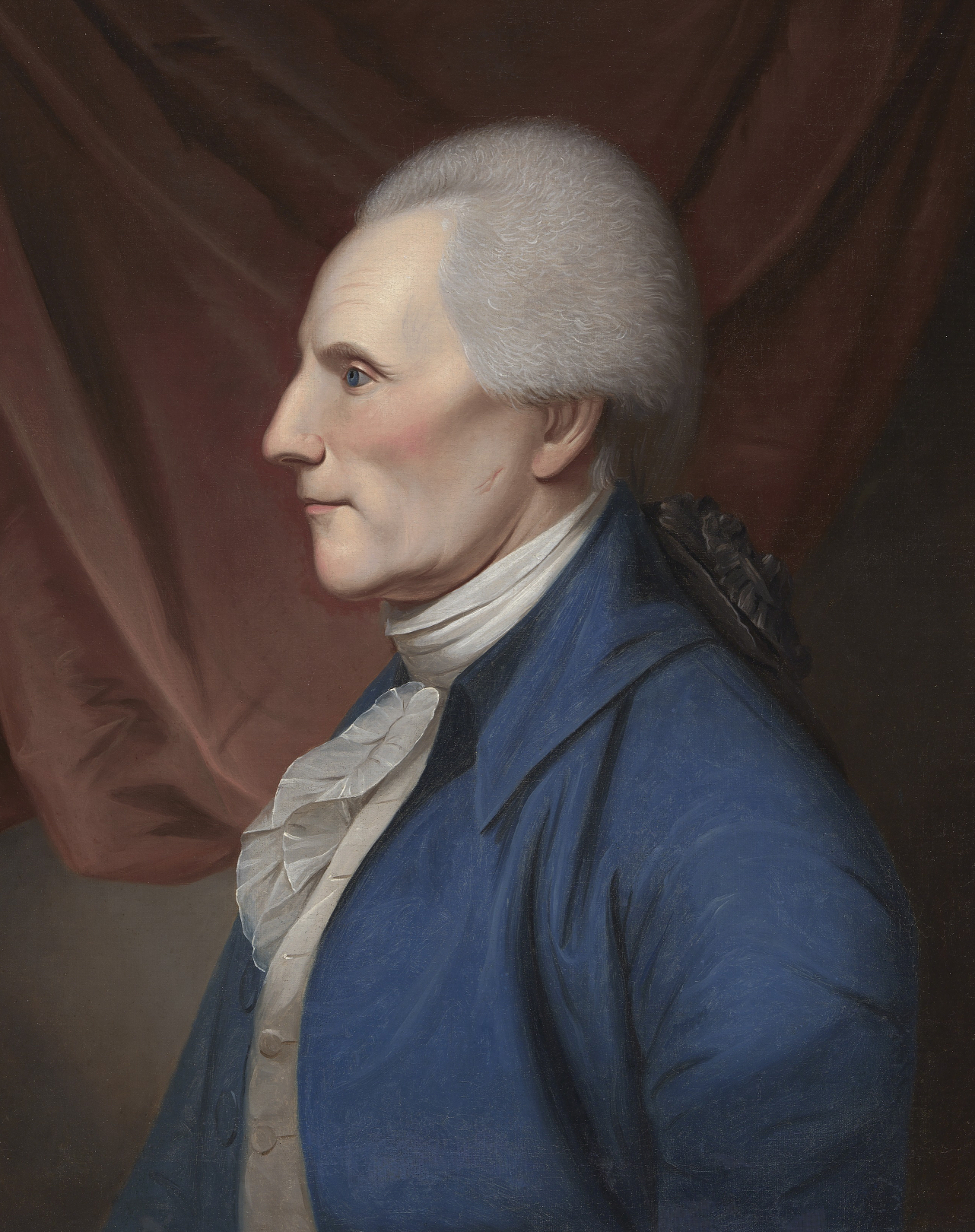
Richard Henry Lee

Henry Lee III

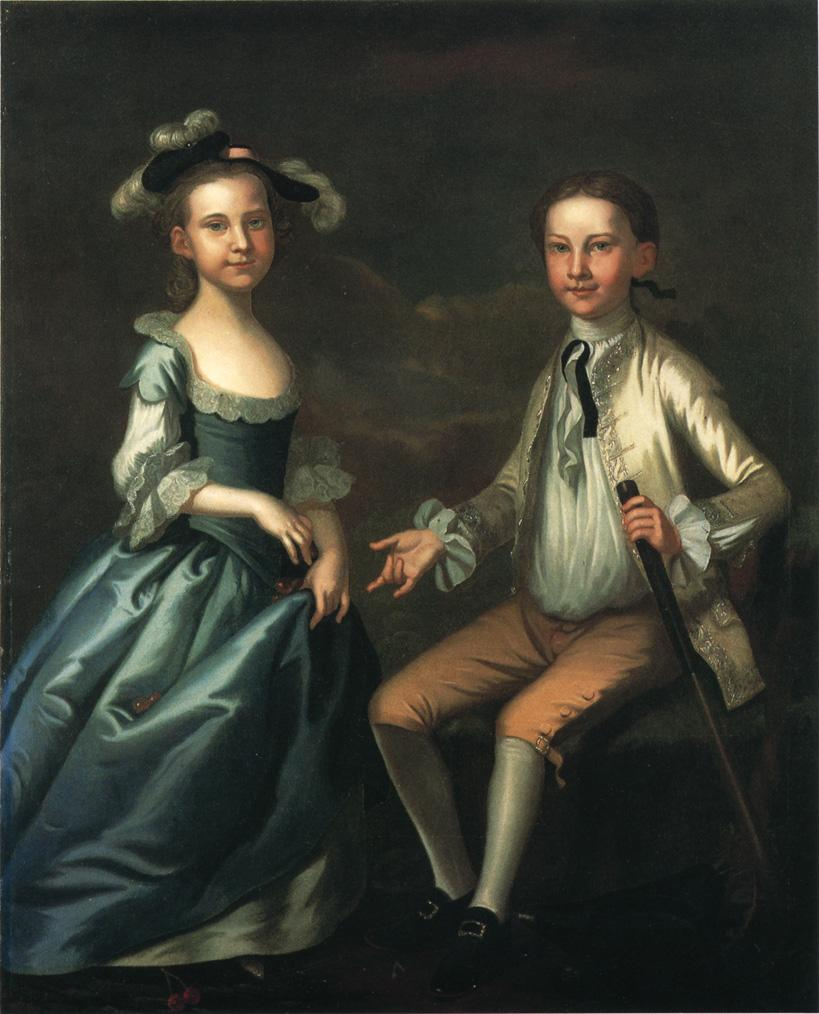
Warner Lewis II and Rebecca Lewis

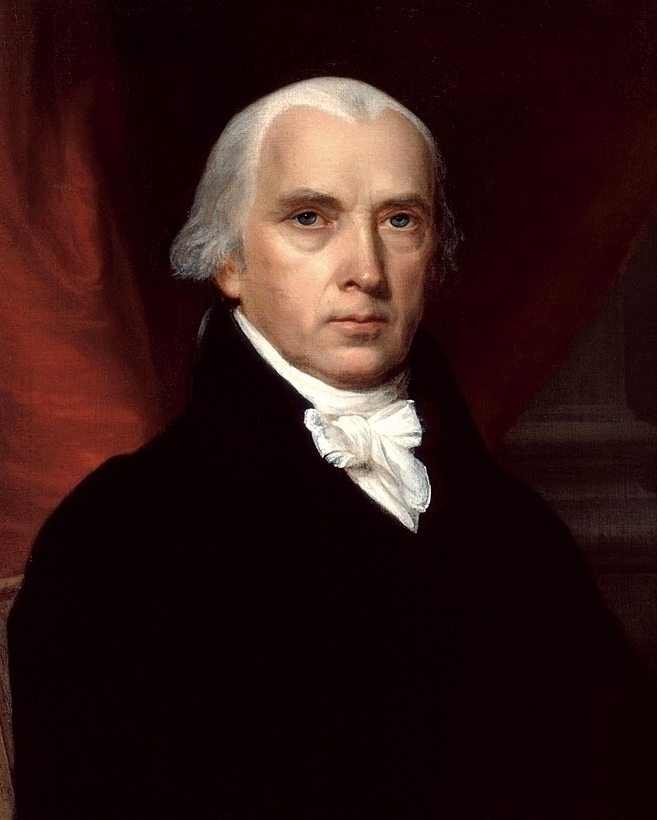
James Madison

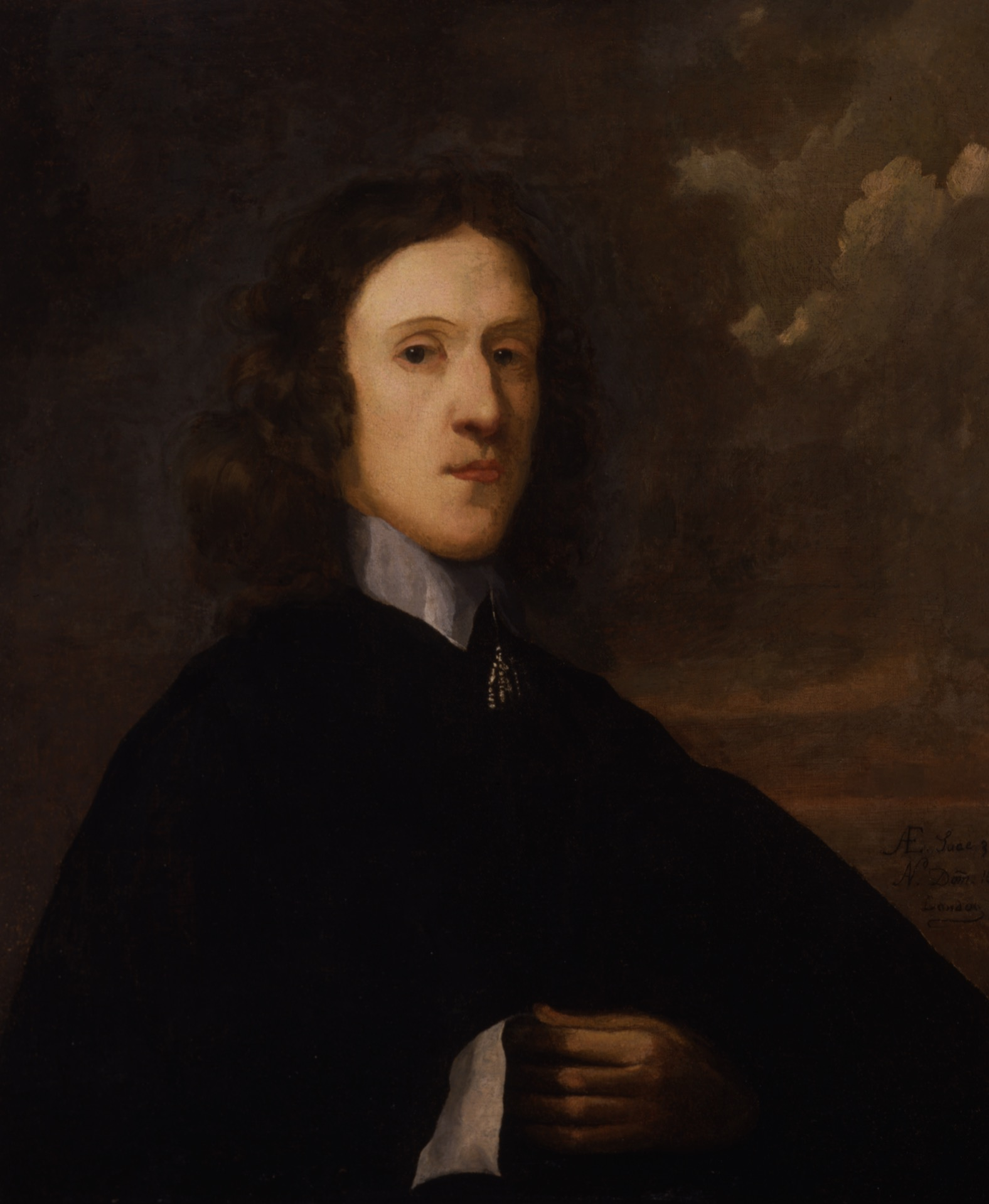
John Page

John Page

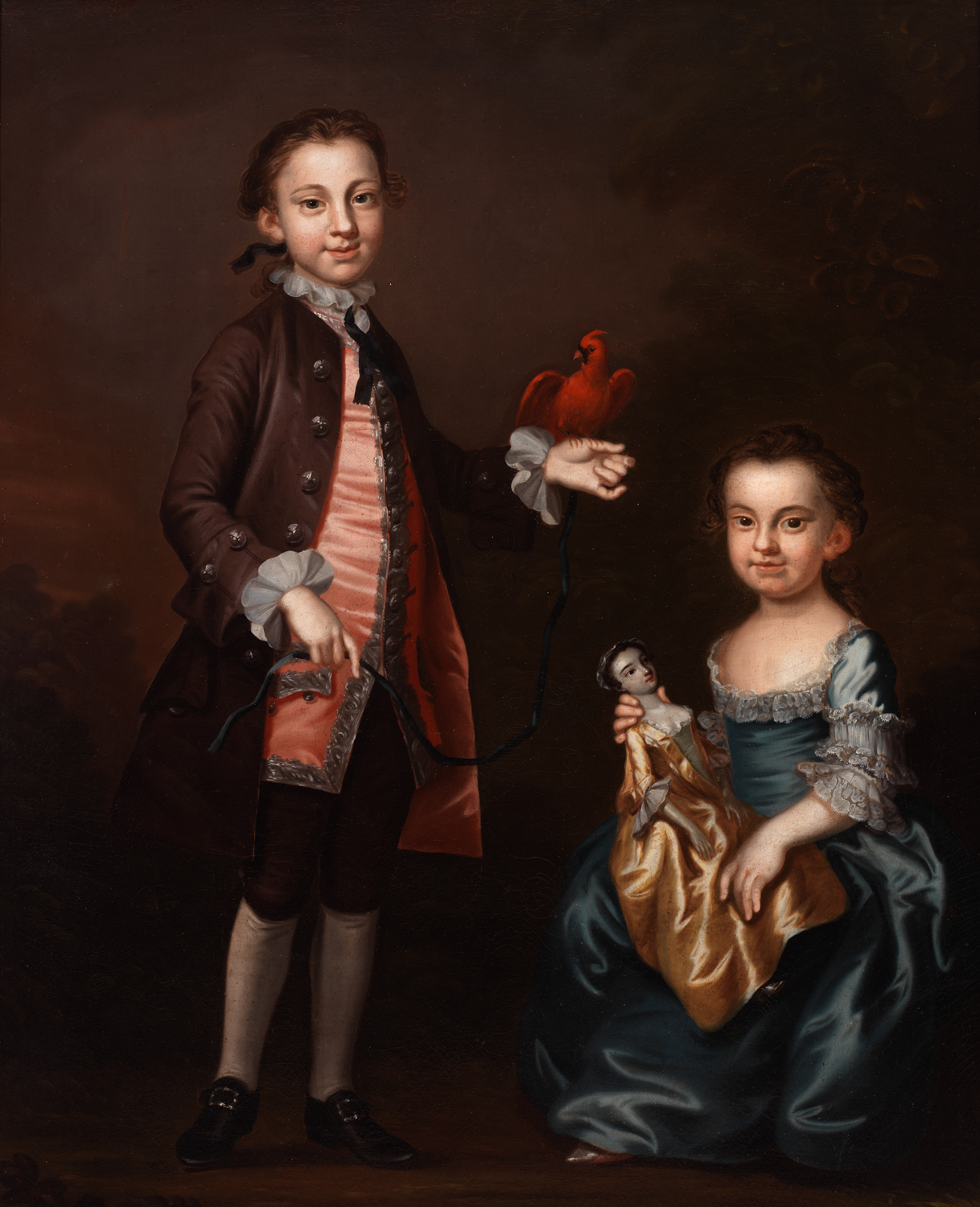
Mann Page and his sister Elizabeth

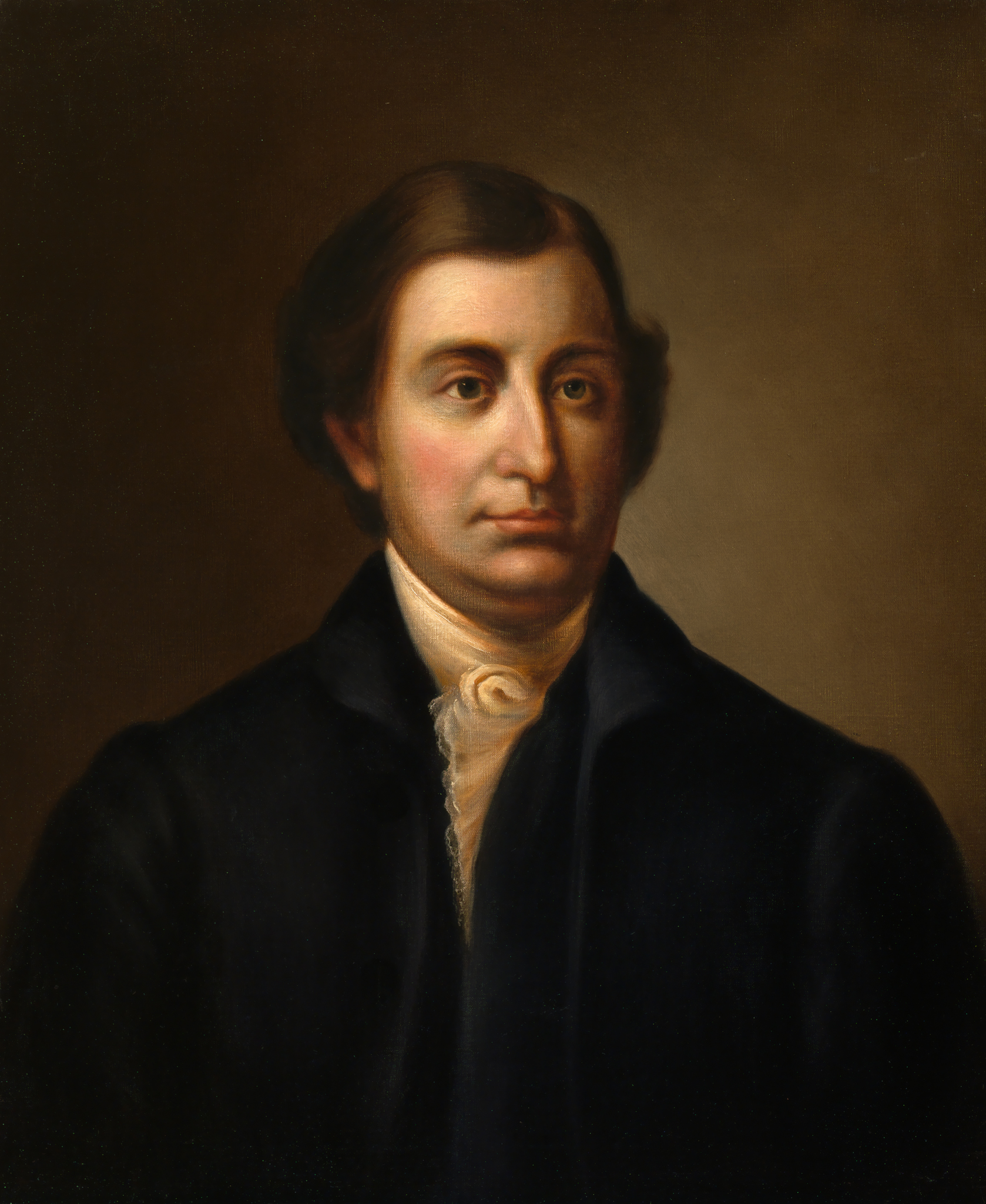
Edmund Randolph

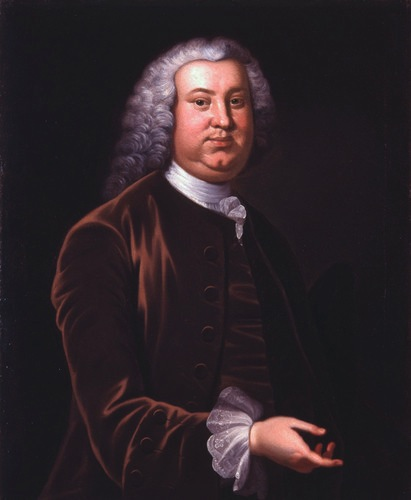
Peyton Randolph

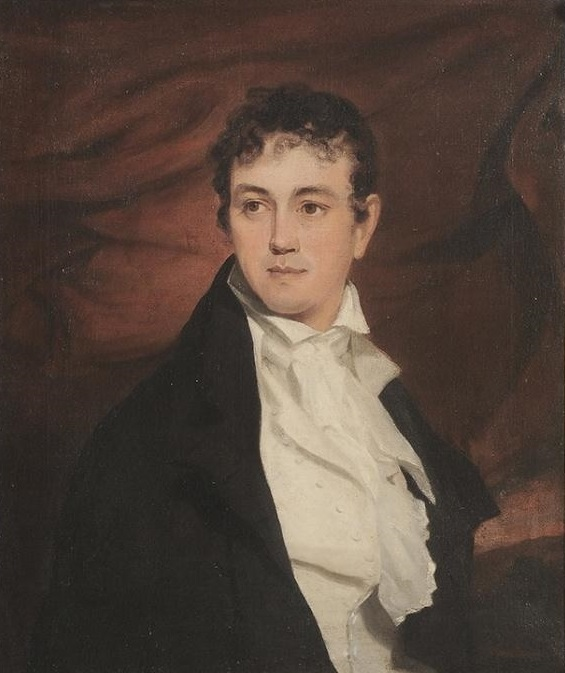
Peyton Randolph

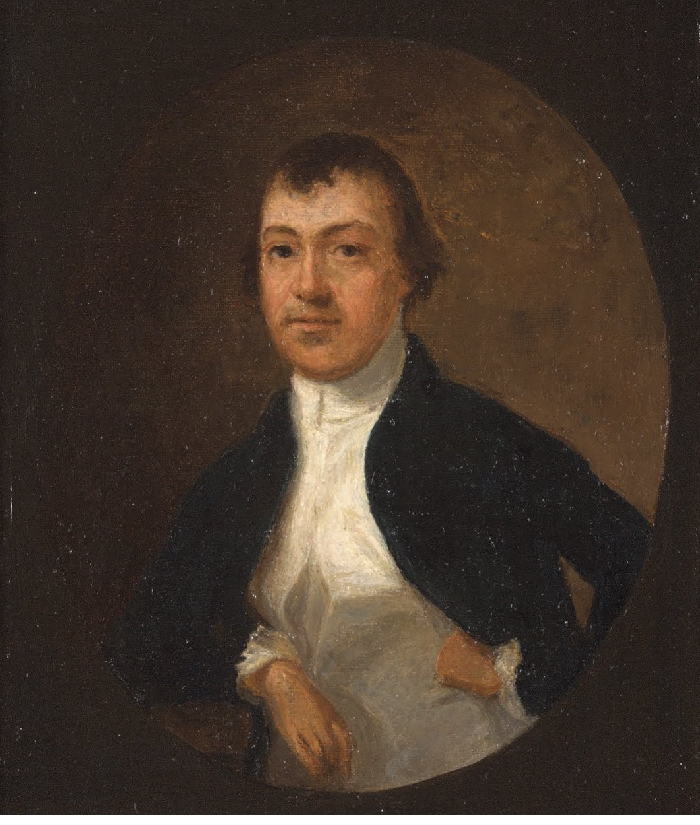
Thomas Mann Randolph Jr.

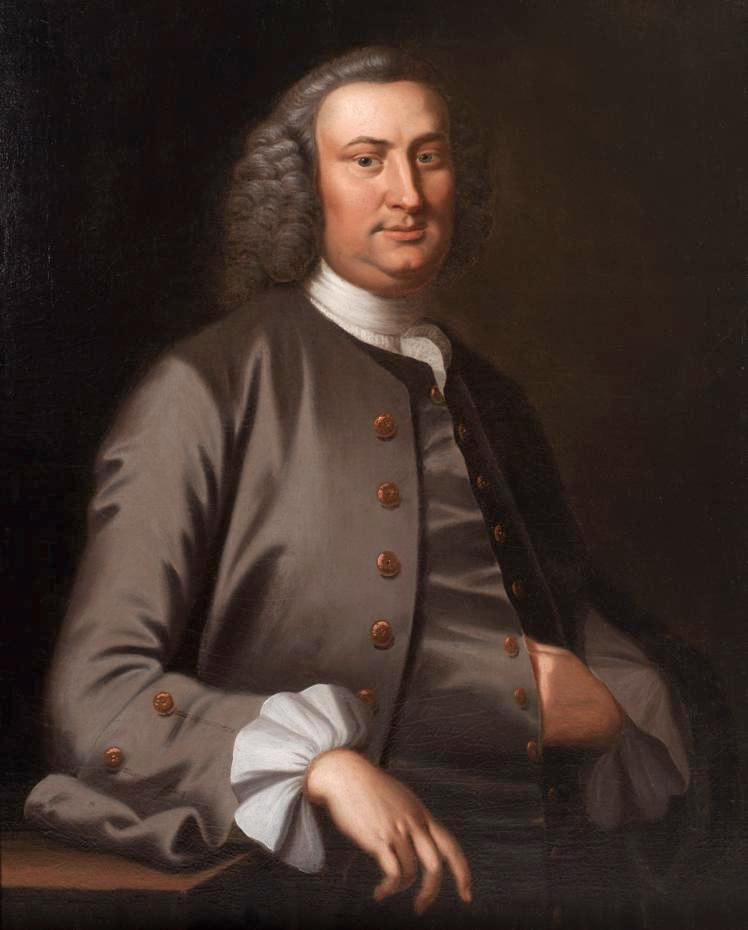
William Randolph III

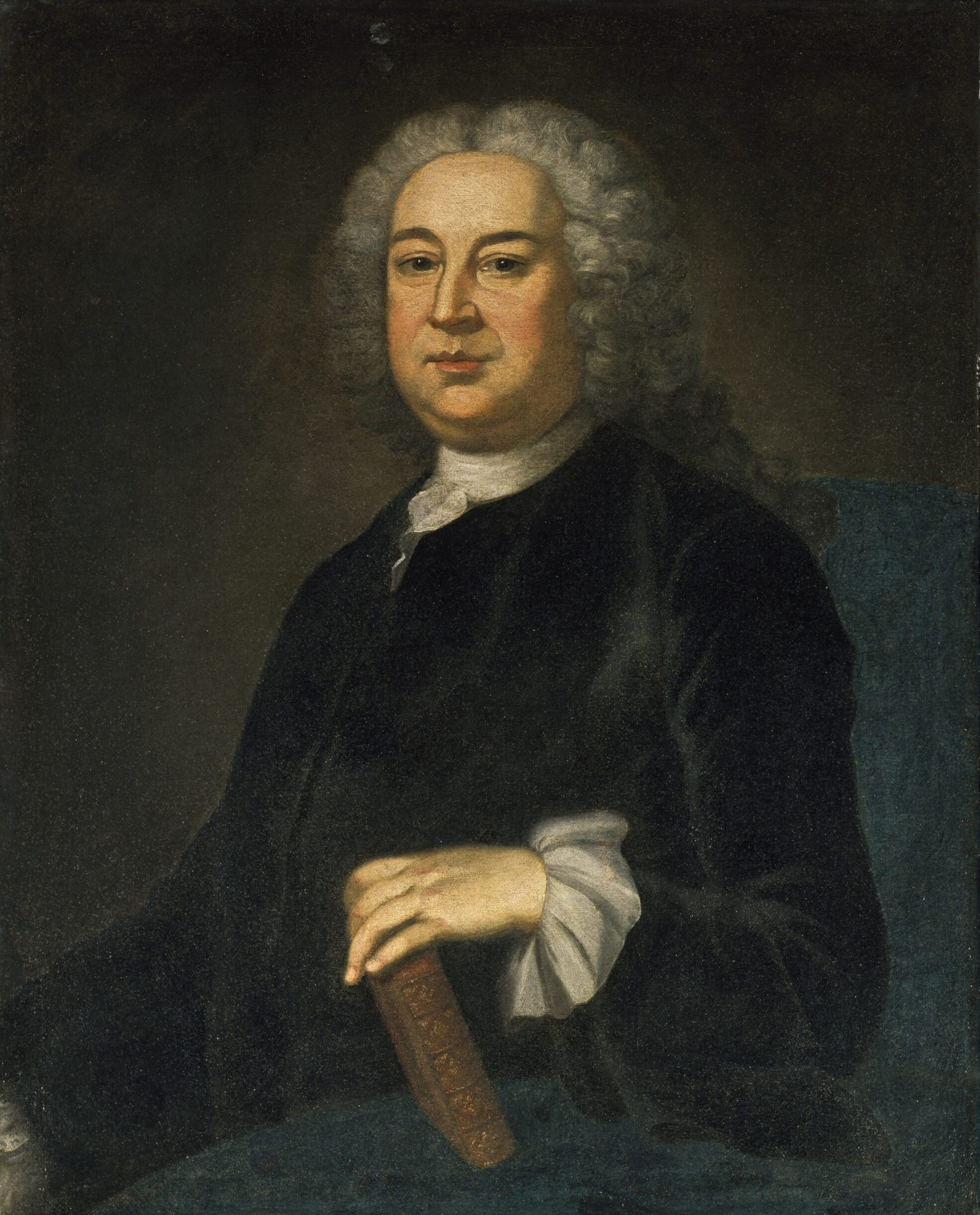
John Robinson

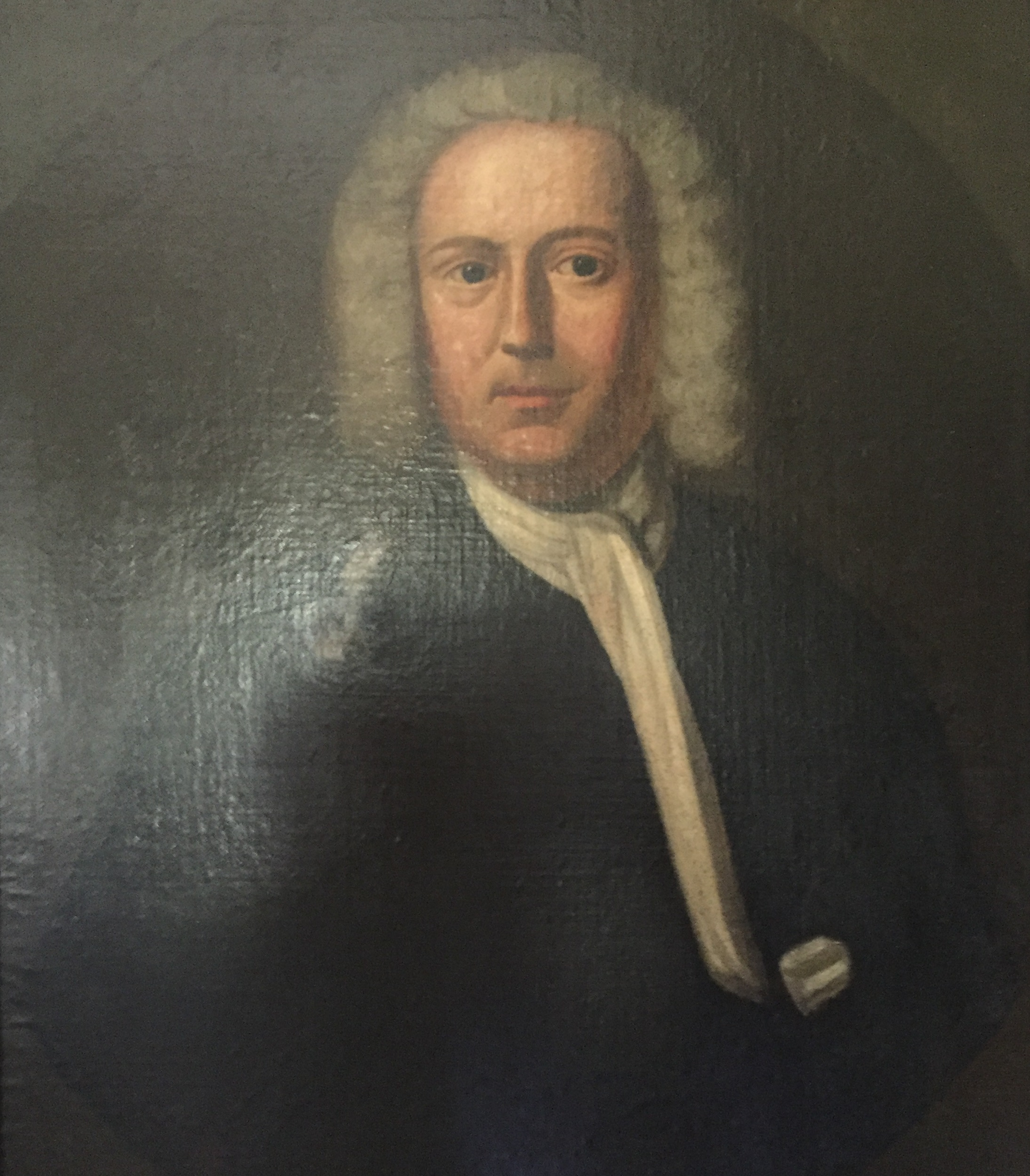
John Tayloe I

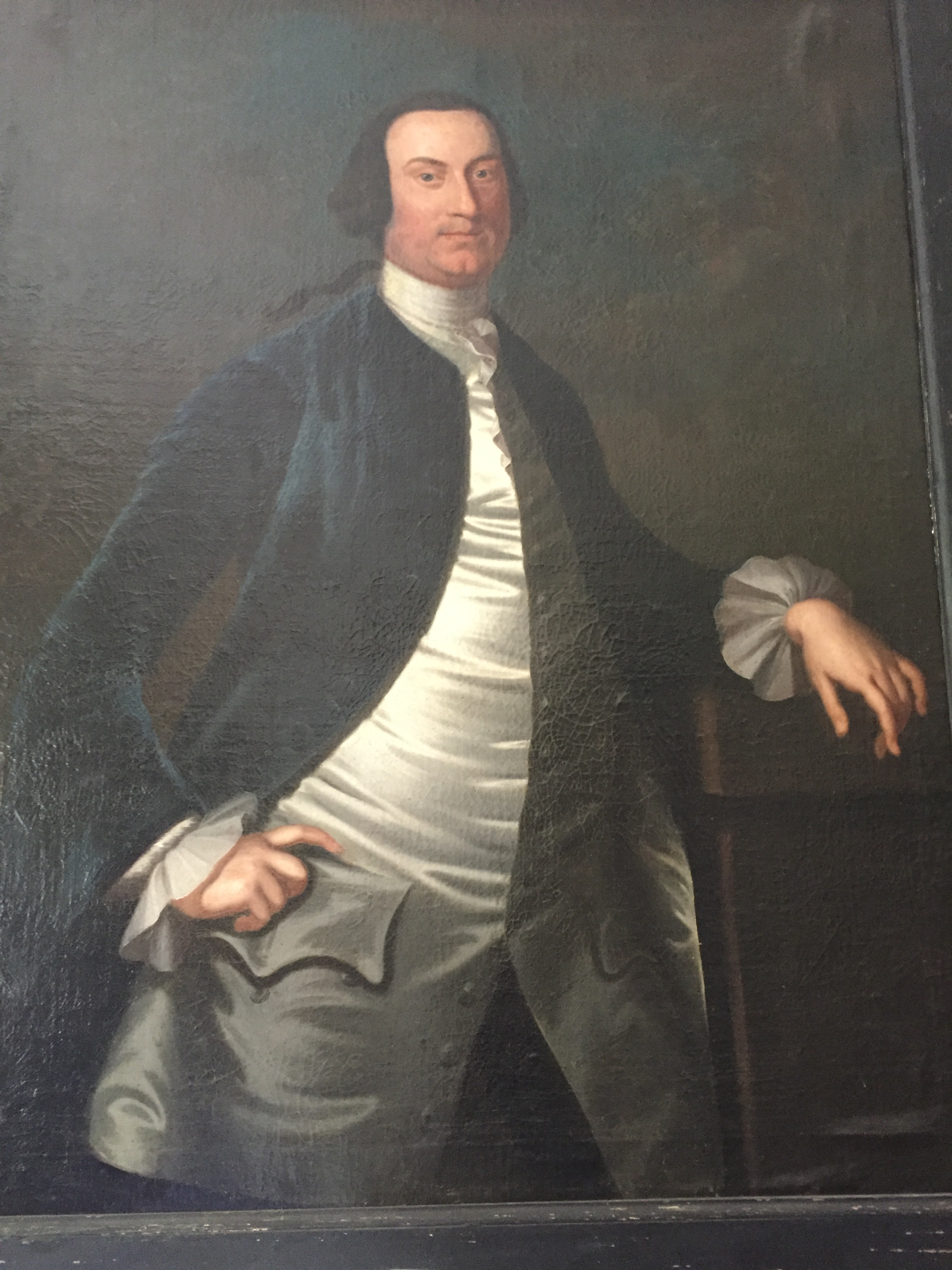
John Tayloe II

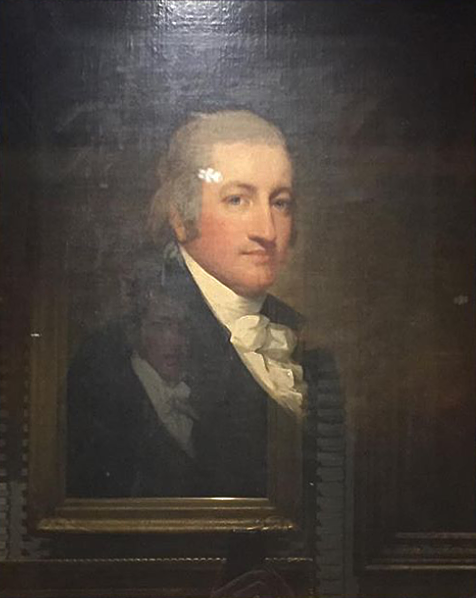
John Tayloe III

== Estate gallery ==
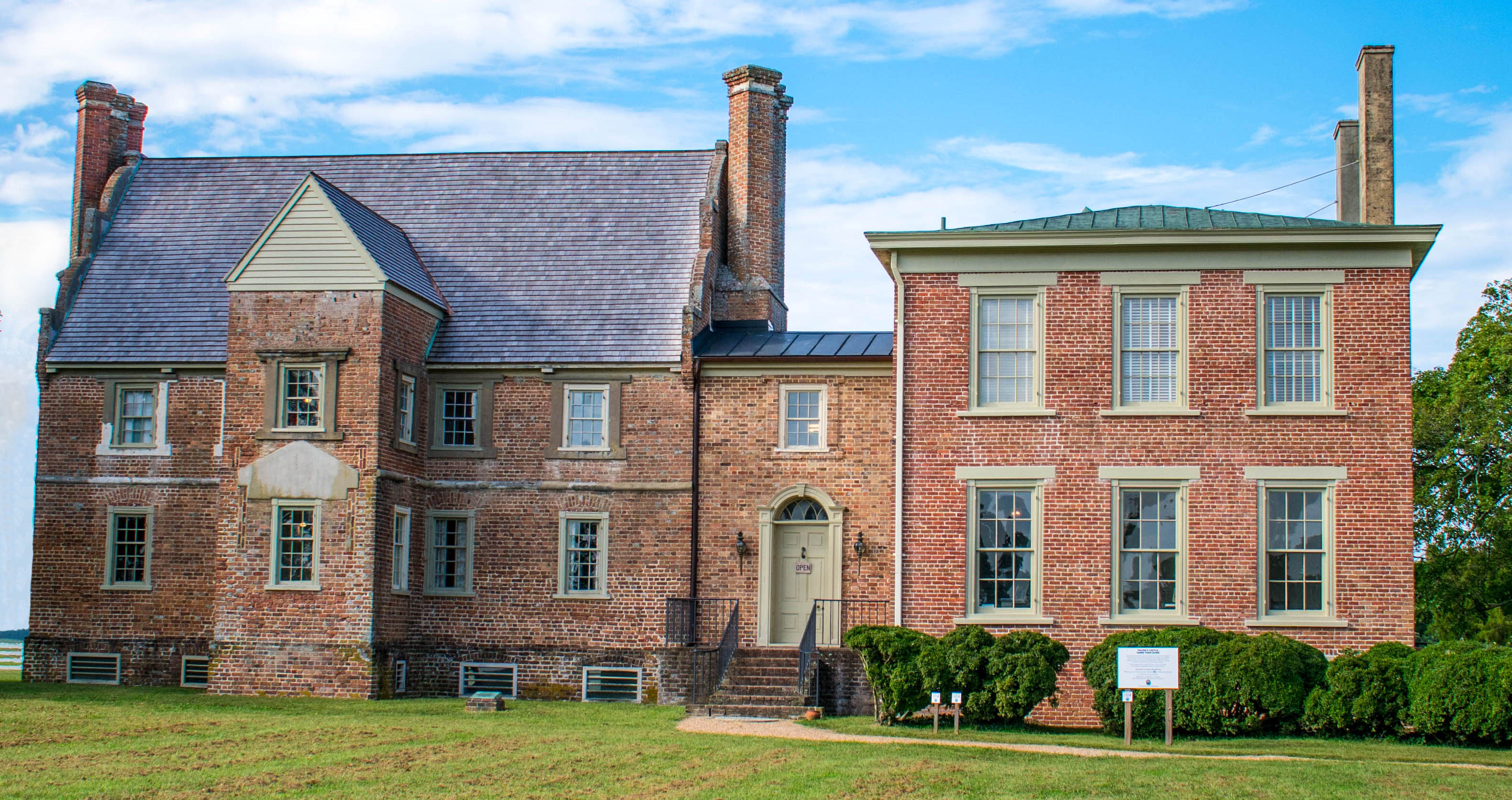
Allen Family, Bacon's Castle Surry County, Virginia, oldest documented brick dwelling in the United States

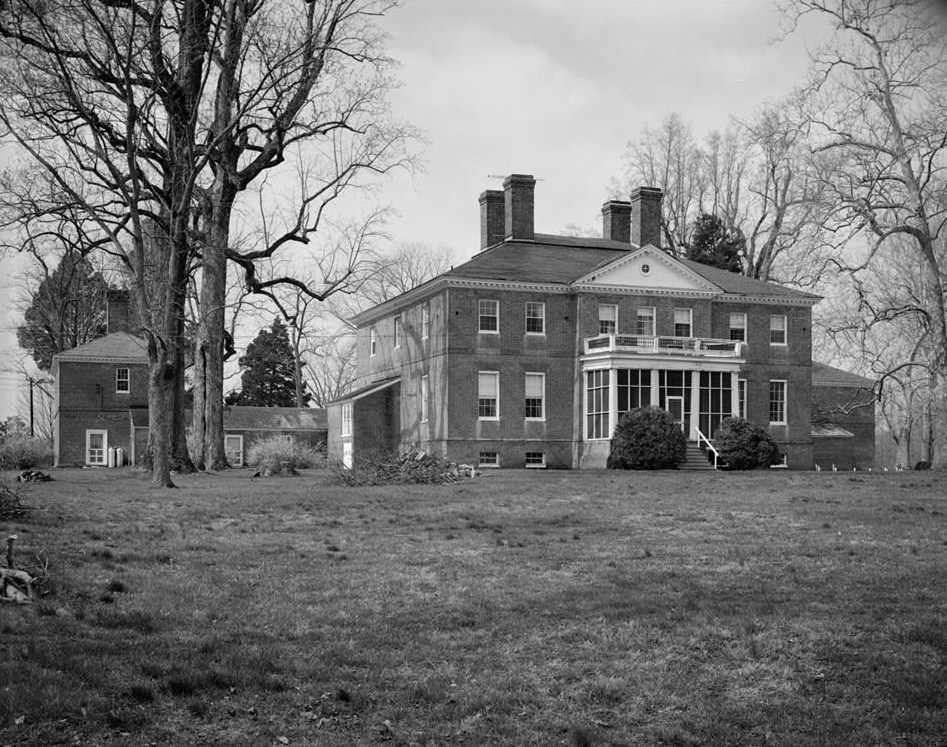
Beverley Family, Blandfield, Caret, Essex County, Virginia

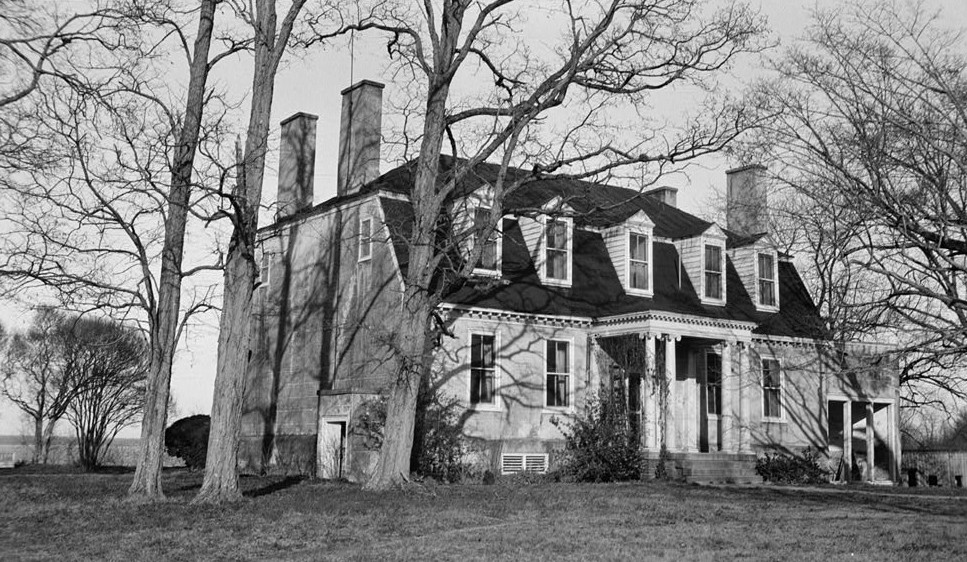
Browne Family, Four Mile Tree, Surry, Virginia

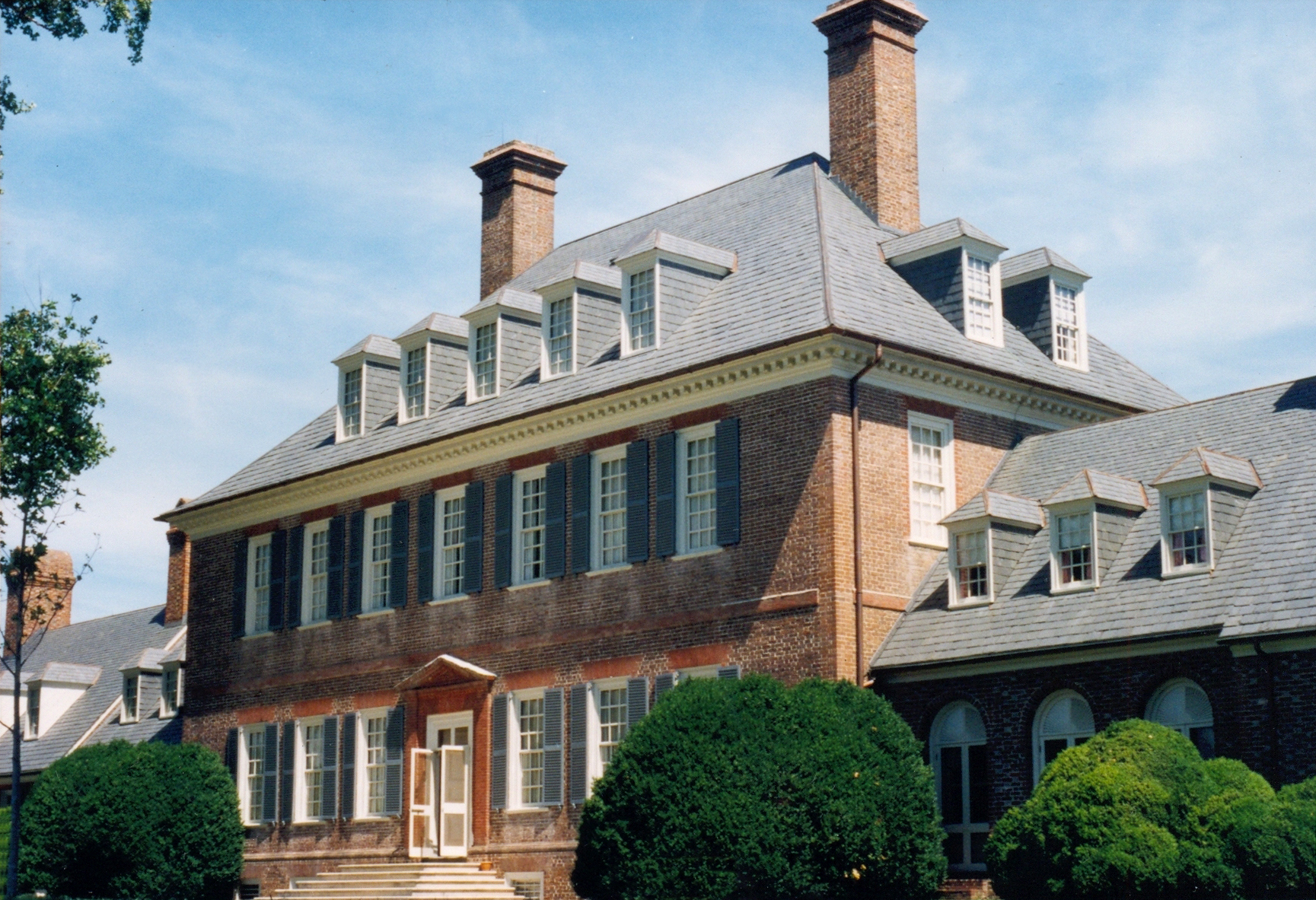
Burwell Family, Carter's Grove, James City County, Virginia

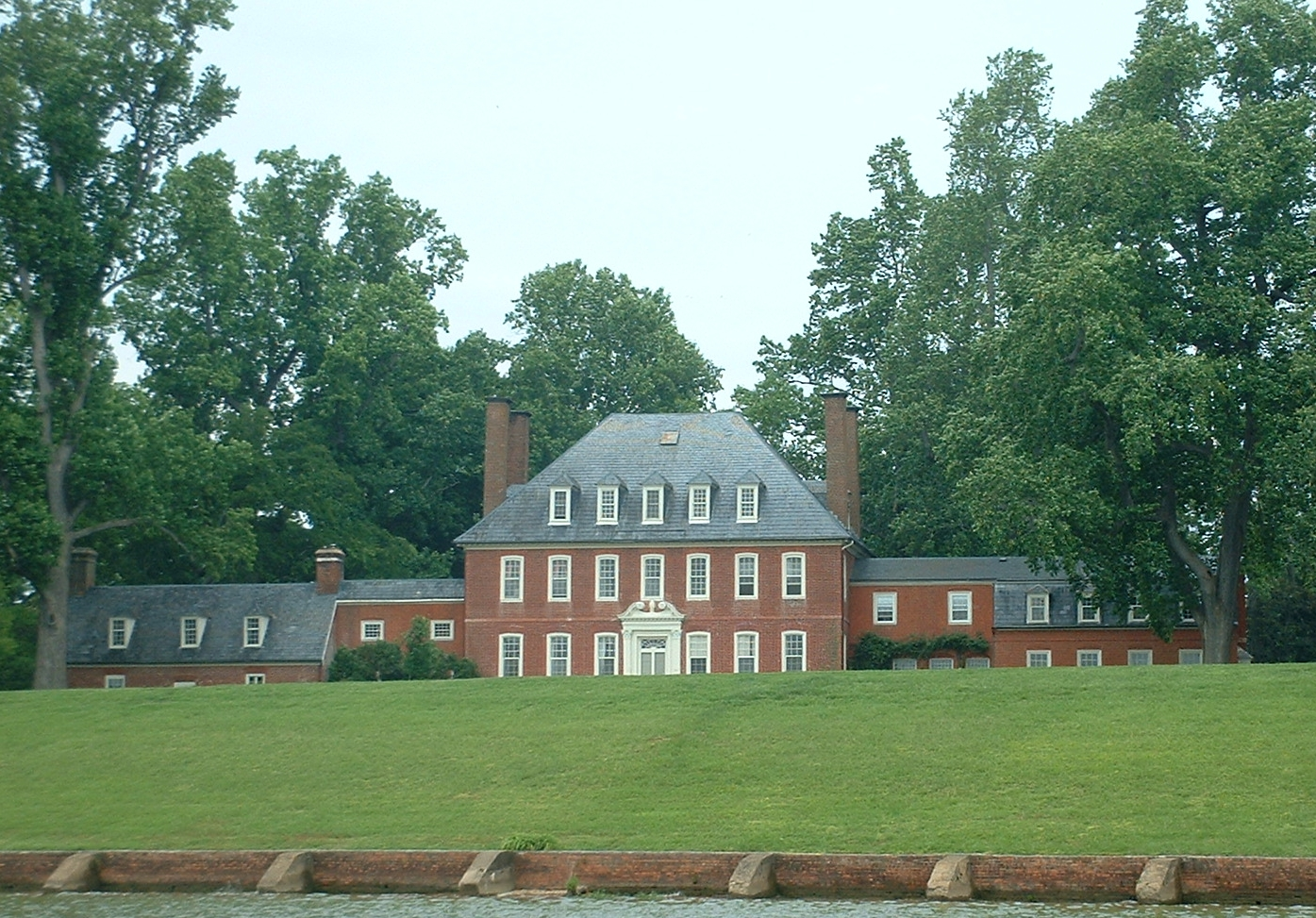
Byrd Family, Westover Plantation, Charles City County, Virginia

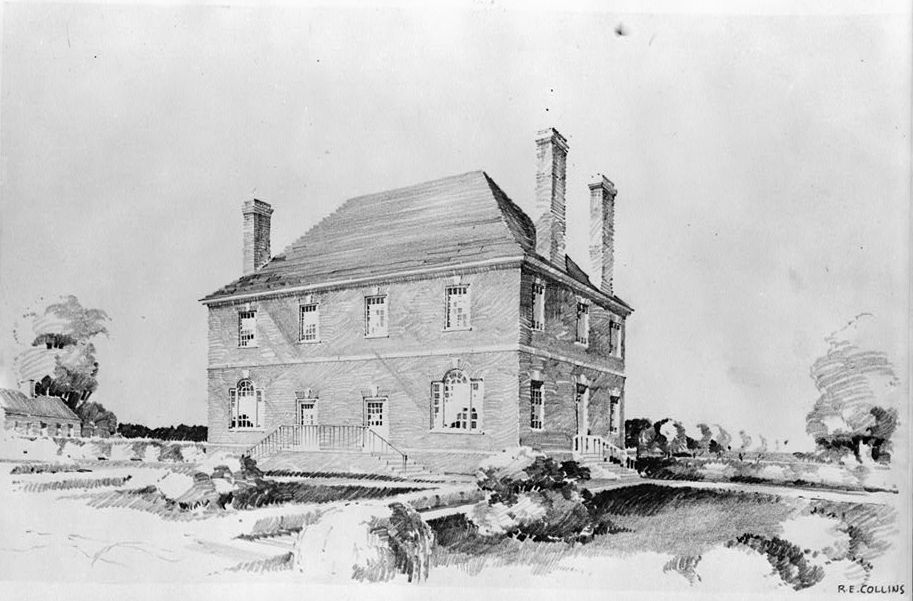
Carter Family, Nomini Hall, Westmoreland County, Virginia

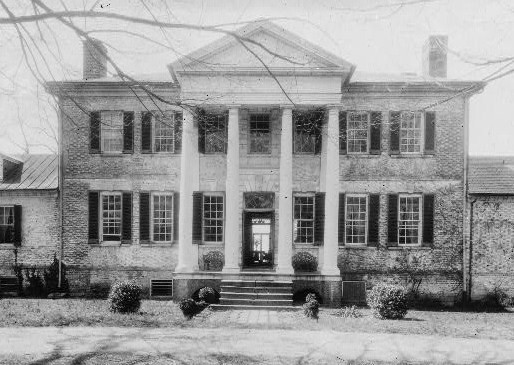
Wellford-Carter Family, Sabine Hall, Richmond Co, Virginia

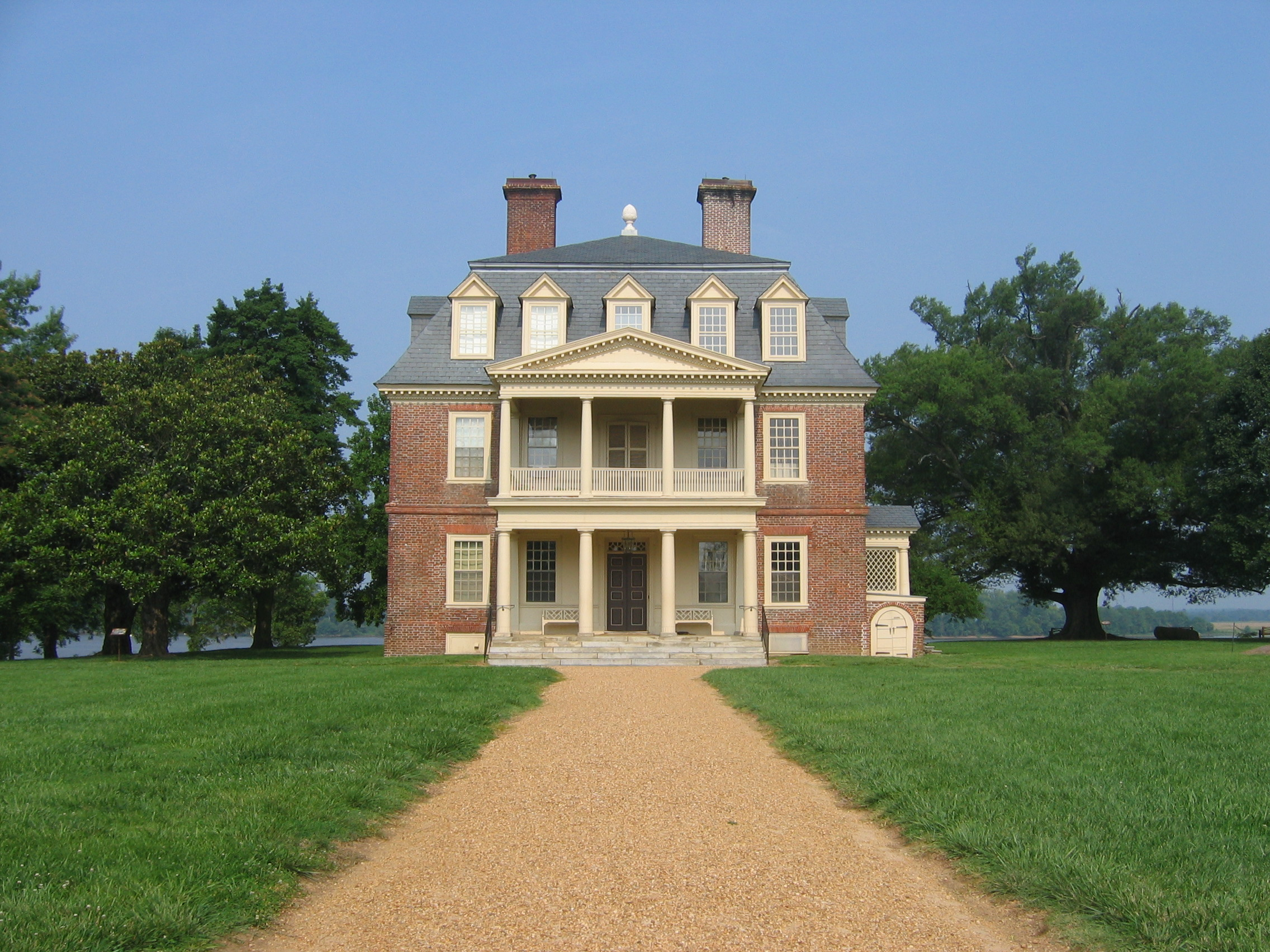
Hill-Carter Family, Charles City County, Virginia

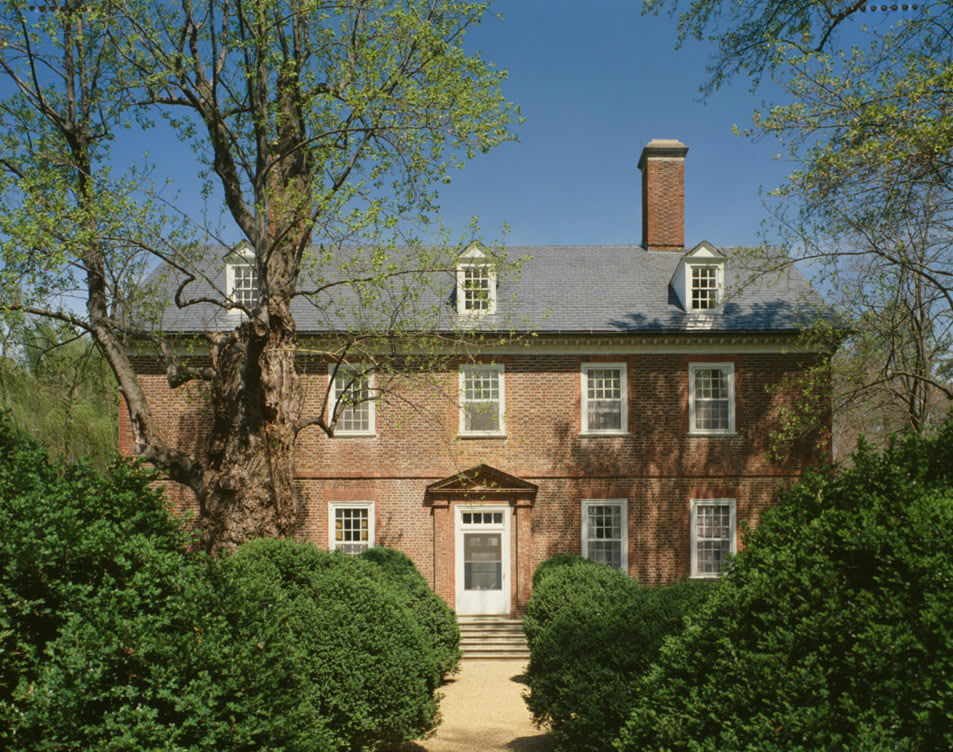
Harrison Family, Berkeley, Charles City County, Virginia

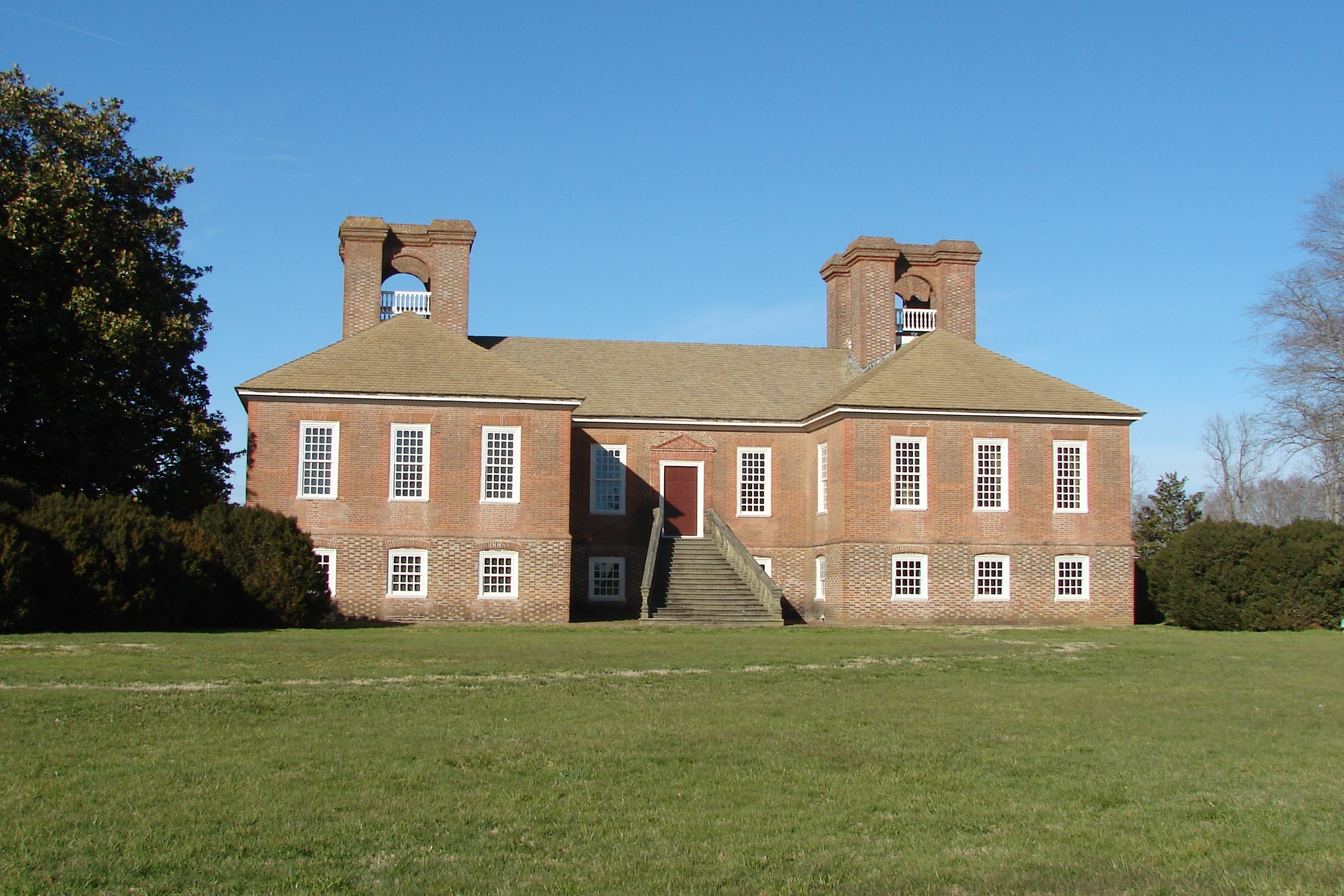
Lee Family, Stratford Hall, Westmoreland County, Virginia

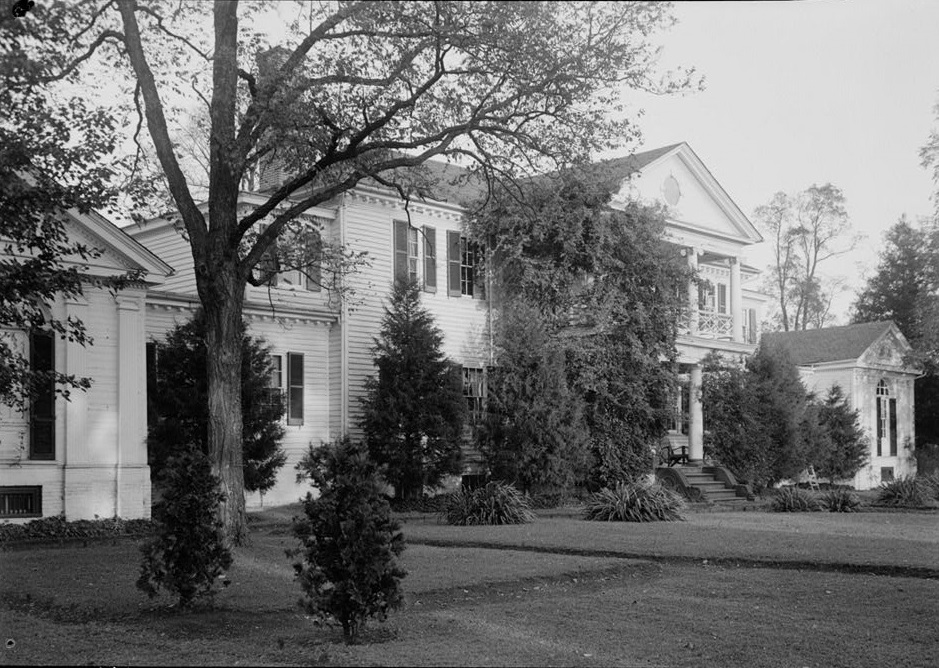
Madison Family, Belle Grove, Carolina County, Virginia

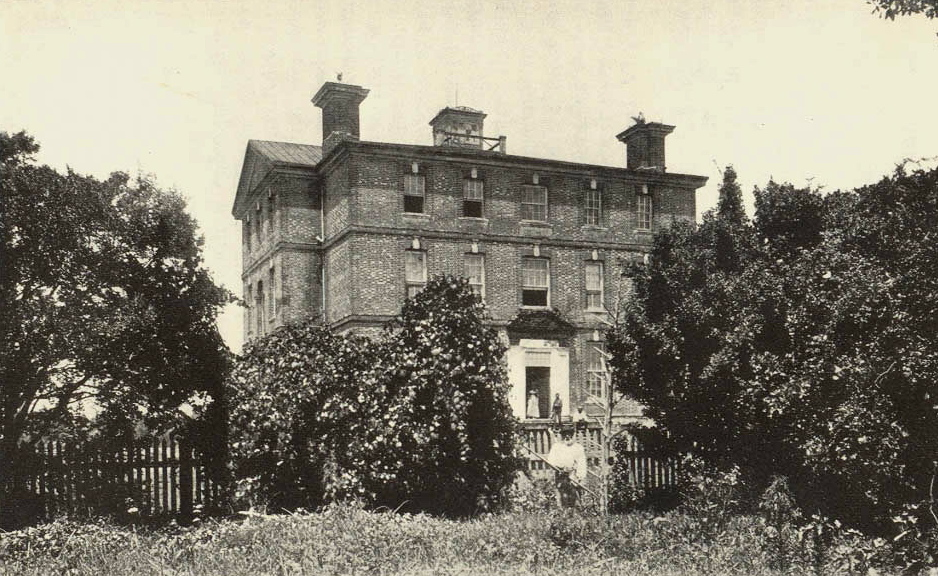
Page Family, Rosewell, Gloucester County, Virginia

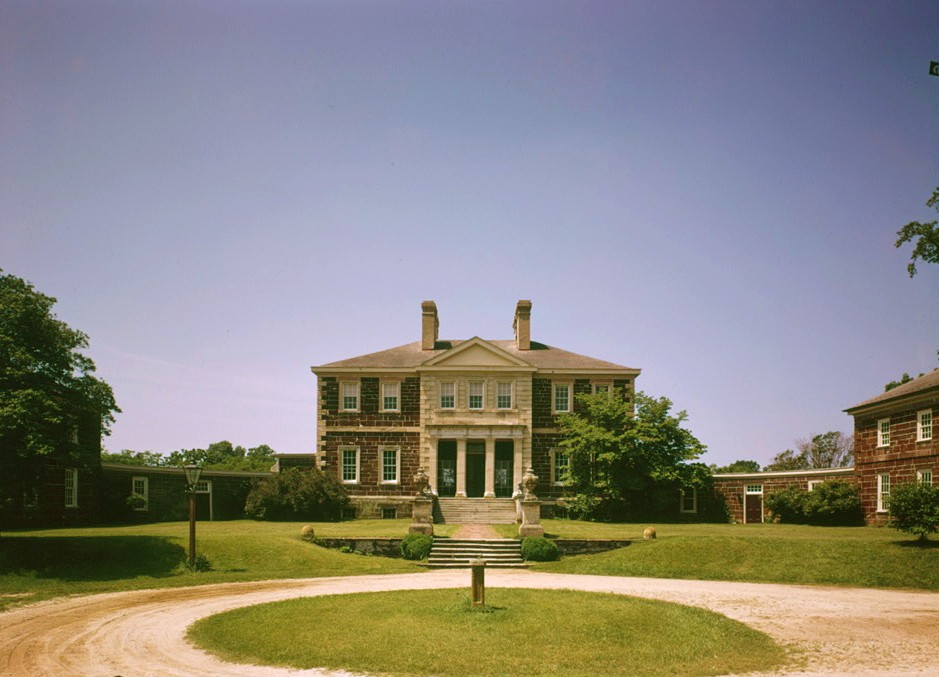
Tayloe Family, Mount Airy, Richmond Co, Virginia

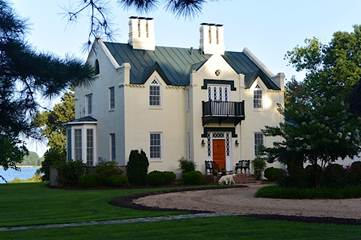
Taliaferro, Wellford, Burgh Westra, Gloucester, Virginia

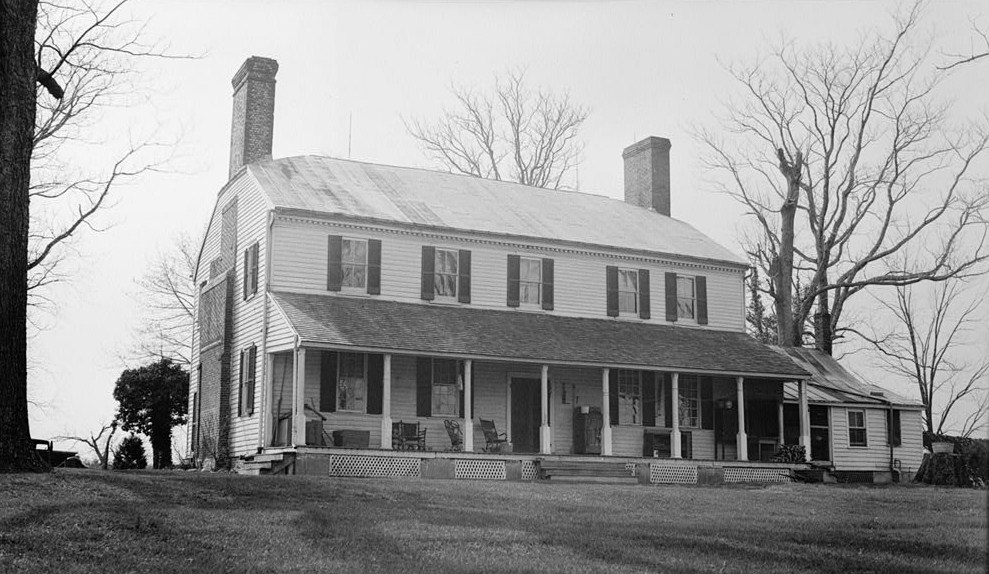
Fitzhugh Family, Marmion, Comorn, Virginia

== See also ==
- Colonial families of Maryland
- American gentry
- European colonization of the Americas

== Notes on sources ==
- Note: Source 1: Captain William Tucker / Author: Barbara Jennifer Benefield / Publication: RootsWeb.com, May 12, 2004
- Note: Source 2 / Author: Doug Tucker / Publication: GenForum, January 16, 2006
- Note: Source 3 / Author: Marie Moore / Publication: RootsWeb.com, November 29, 2004 / "Note: died at sea"
- Note: Source 4 / Author: Phillip Judson Clark / Title: Royal Families and Others & also their Famous Descendants / Publication: rootsweb.com, January 1, 2008
