= Comorn =

Comorn can refer to

- Comorn, Virginia
- Komárom a city in Hungary, and the site of an old strategic fortress often referred to as Comorn in old sources.
