= Omohundro =

Omohundro is an American surname of probable English origin. All Omohundros in the United States are descended from Richard Omohundro, a farmer who was living in Westmoreland County, Virginia in 1670 and died there in 1697. Mohundro is a variant of the surname used by a branch of the family living mainly in the American South. Despite much speculation, there is no consensus on the ultimate origin or meaning of the surname. The Omohundros are one of the First Families of Virginia.

== People ==
- Texas Jack Omohundro (1846–1880), frontier scout
- Robert Johnson Omohundro (1921–2000), nuclear physicist
- Steve Omohundro (born 1959), computer scientist
- John Omohundro (born 1992), actor

== Other ==
- Omohundro Institute of Early American History and Culture, named following the bequest of Mr. and Mrs. Malvern H. Omohundro Jr.
- Omohundro Water Treatment Plant, municipal water treatment plant located in Nashville, Tennessee
