= Marmion (Comorn, Virginia) =

Historic house in Virginia, United States

- U.S. National Register of Historic Places
- Virginia Landmarks Register
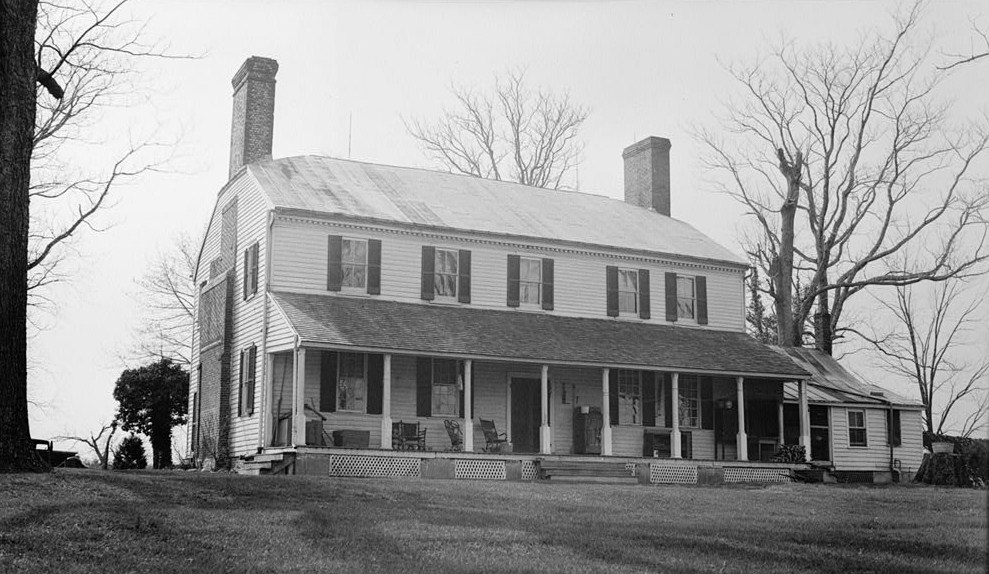
- Marmion, HABS Photo

- Location within Virginia Location within the United States
- Location: NE of jct. of SR 649 and 609, near Comorn, Virginia
- Coordinates: 38°18′35″N 77°12′43″W
- Area: 329 acres (133 ha)
- Built: c. 1670, c. 1790-1800
- NRHP reference No.: 70000804
- VLR No.: 048-0012

Significant dates
- Added to NRHP: February 26, 1970
- Designated VLR: December 2, 1969

Marmion is a historic home located near Comorn, King George County, Virginia. The original section was built about 1670 by William Fitzhugh (1651-1701), progenitor of the Fitzhugh family in Virginia. It took its present form after 1790 or 1800. The house is a frame, two-story house with a clipped gable roof and two interior end chimneys with exposed chimney shafts. Also on the property are the contributing smokehouse, dairy, kitchen, and office.

The ornately painted decorative paneling from the house's distinctive seven-sided drawing room was sold to The Metropolitan Museum of Art in 1916.

It was listed on the National Register of Historic Places in 1970.
