= Blandfield =

Historic house in Virginia, United States

- U.S. National Register of Historic Places
- Virginia Landmarks Register
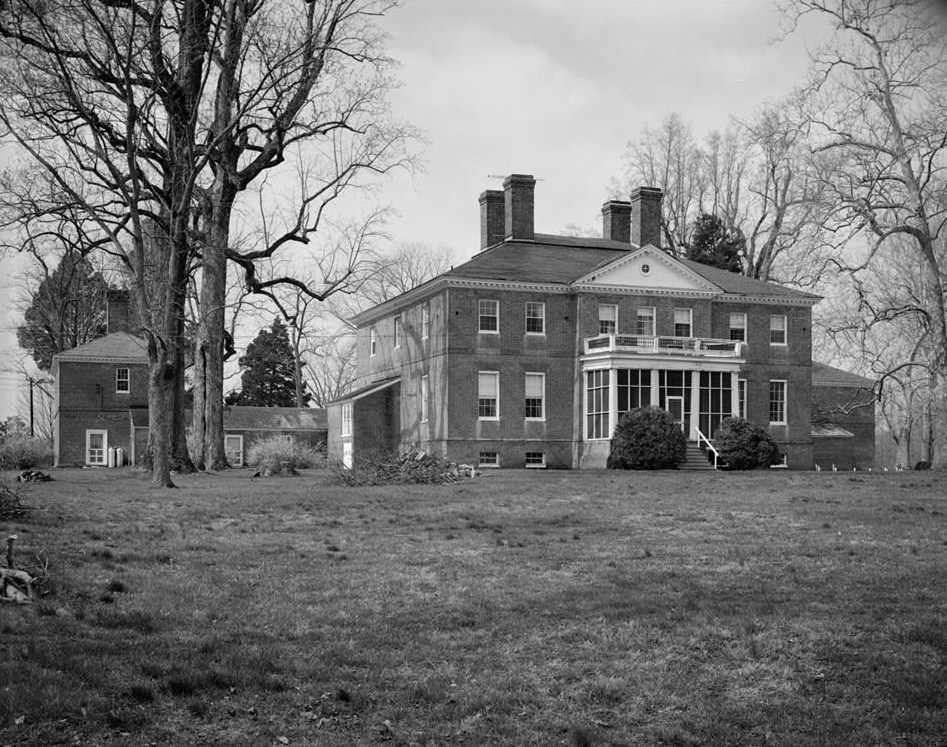
- Blandfield, HABS Photo, 1983

- Location within Virginia Location within the United States
- Location: E of jct. of Rtes. 624 and U.S. 17, Caret, Virginia
- Coordinates: 38°00′01″N 76°56′59″W
- Area: 3,500 acres (1,400 ha)
- Built: c. 1750
- Architectural style: Georgian, Mid-Georgian
- NRHP reference No.: 69000238
- VLR No.: 028-0005

Significant dates
- Added to NRHP: November 12, 1969
- Designated VLR: May 13, 1969

Blandfield is a historic plantation house located at Caret, Essex County, Virginia. It was built about 1716–1720, and is a brick dwelling consisting of a two-story, central block with flanking two-story dependencies connected by one-story hyphens in the Georgian style. Blandfield was built for William Beverley (1696–1756), son of Virginia's first native-born historian, Robert Beverley, Jr. (c. 1673–1722). The house is one of the largest colonial plantation mansions in Virginia, and as of 1969, was still in the Beverley family.

It was listed on the National Register of Historic Places in 1969.
