= Caret, Virginia =

Unincorporated community in Virginia, United States

- Unincorporated community
- Location within Virginia Location within the United States
- Coordinates: 37°58′57″N 76°57′41″W
- Country: United States
- State: Virginia
- County: Essex
- Elevation: 144 ft (44 m)
- Time zone: UTC-5 (Eastern (EST))
  - Summer (DST): UTC-4 (EDT)
- Area code: 804
- GNIS feature ID: 1477176

Caret is an unincorporated community in Essex County, in the U.S. state of Virginia.

Blandfield was listed on the National Register of Historic Places in 1969.
