= Comorn, Virginia =

Unincorporated community in Virginia, United States

- Unincorporated community
- Location within Virginia and the United States Comorn (the United States)
- Coordinates: 38°16′49″N 77°13′16″W
- Country: United States
- State: Virginia
- County: King George
- Time zone: UTC−5 (Eastern (EST))
  - Summer (DST): UTC−4 (EDT)

Comorn is an unincorporated community in King George County, Virginia, United States.

"Comorn" is an English form of the name of Komárom, a historic town in Hungary which had a prominent place in the Hungarian Revolution of 1848.

Marmion, 17th century house in Comorn, was listed on the National Register of Historic Places in 1992.
