= Varina Farms =

Historic house in Virginia, United States

- Varina Plantation
- U.S. National Register of Historic Places
- Virginia Landmarks Register
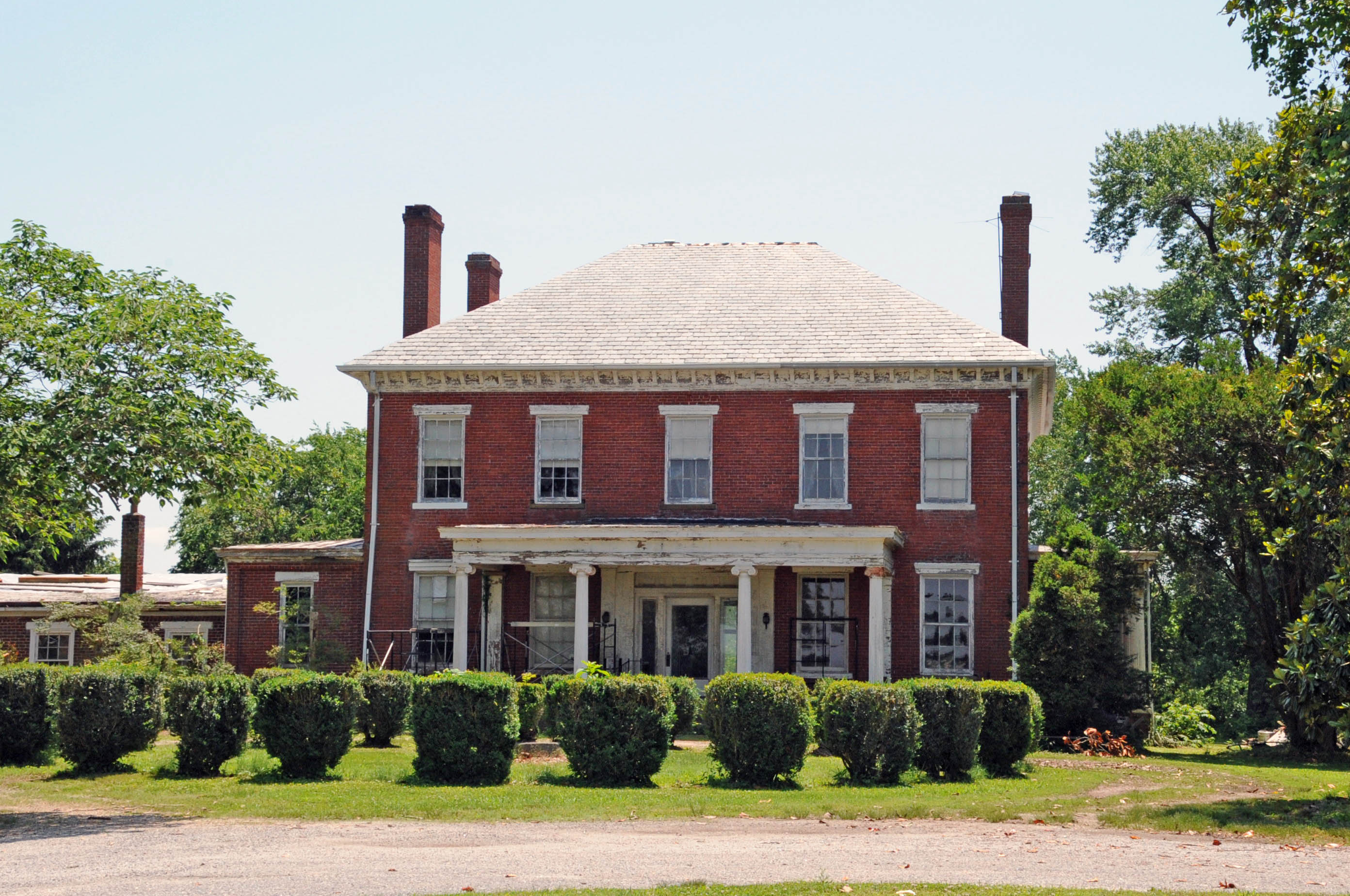

- Location within Virginia Location within the United States
- Location: Henrico County, Virginia, USA
- Nearest city: Varina, Virginia; Hopewell, Virginia
- Coordinates: 37°22′54″N 77°20′09″W
- Area: 820 acres (330 ha)
- NRHP reference No.: 77001489
- VLR No.: 043-0020

Significant dates
- Added to NRHP: April 29, 1977
- Designated VLR: September 21, 1976

Varina Farms, also known as Varina Plantation or Varina Farms Plantation or Varina on the James, is a plantation established in the 17th century on the James River about 10 miles (16 km) south of Richmond, Virginia. An 820-acre (330 ha) property was listed on the National Register of Historic Places in 1977 as "Varina Plantation". At that time it included two contributing buildings and one other contributing site.

It was established 50 miles (80 km) from the first settlement at Jamestown in the Virginia Colony, and across the river from Henricus, established by Thomas Dale in 1611. Varina Farm, as it is now called, was still a working, privately owned farm in 1977. In 2024, the county government of Henrico purchased the site for historic and environmental preservation.

== Description ==
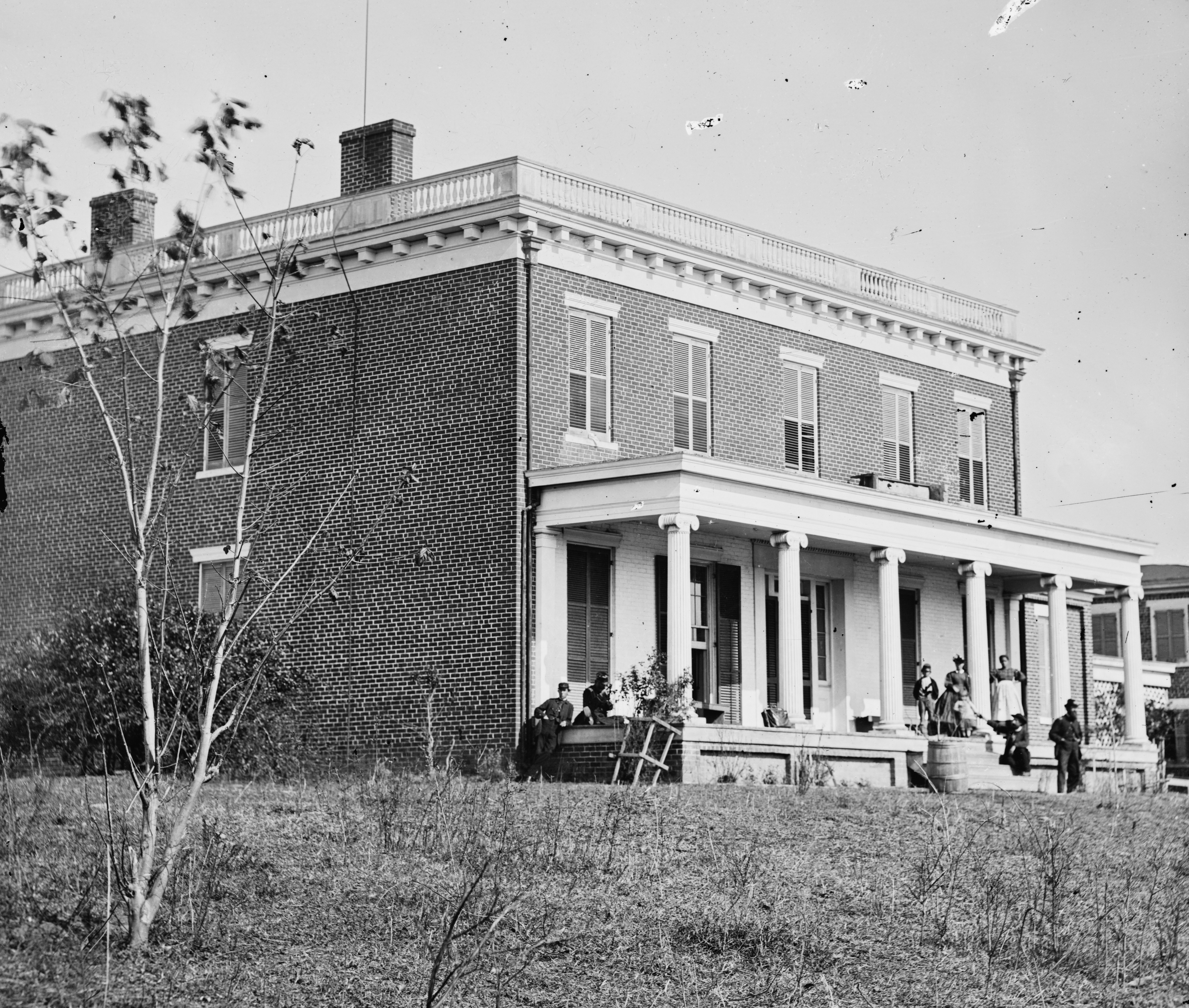
Aiken house at Varina, 1861–1869.

The two-story residence, built in 1853, is a common-bond brick structure, which has a kitchen at the east side of the dwelling, separated by a long hyphen. It faces the James River, and the river-side of the house has French doors that open to the outdoors. There are five bays and the second floor has six-over-six sash and wooden sills and lintels. An Ionic porch runs the river side of the house and a portion of the west end of the house. The porch is dated to 1941 when the porch was rebuilt due to a tornado in 1941. Following a storm in 1911, the original low hipped roof was replaced with a high hipped roof.

Varina Farms covers 2,200 acres. Of that, the plantation—the historic portion of the farm that was nominated at the National Register of Historic Places—encompasses 820 acres. The farm has historic buildings, including a 1 1/2-story antebellum brick barn and sheds.

== History ==
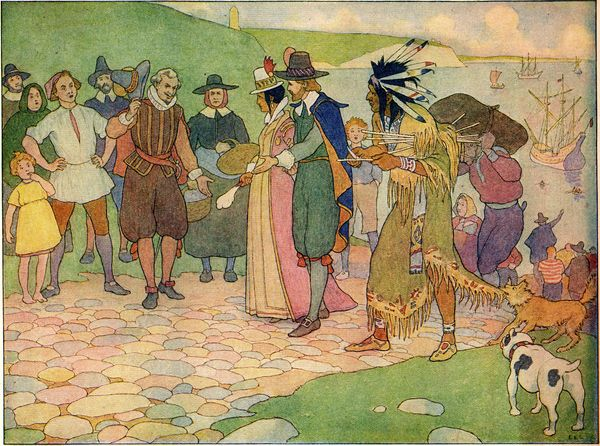
Elmer Boyd Smith, John Rolfe and Pocahontas, 1906

=== John Rolfe and Pocahontas ===
In 1612, English colonist John Rolfe introduced the cultivation of a special strain of tobacco (Nicotiana tabacum) in Jamestown for export to England, which was much better-liked by the Europeans than a harsher form which grew naturally in Virginia. (Note: There is a rumor that Pocahontas and John Rolfe were connected with Varinia.) As his tobacco became a cash crop for the struggling colony's economy, about 1615 he established a plantation estate 50 miles (80 km) from the first settlement at Jamestown. He called his plantation Varina or Verinas, for the Spanish tobacco that was called Verinas. Varina plantation was established across the river from Sir Thomas Dale's 1611 settlement at the progressive community in Henricus.

The plantation became the home of Rolfe and his second wife, Rebecca (Pocahontas) whose father was the Powhatan tribe's leader for two years following their marriage in 1614 in Jamestown and then established their residence at Varina. It was the birthplace of their son, Thomas Rolfe in 1615. In 1616, Rolfe, his wife, and son traveled to London. While they were abroad, Pocahontas died on March 21, 1617, and was buried at St George's Church, Gravesend in Kent, England. Rolfe returned to Varina and ran it until 1622, when he is presumed to have died during the Indian massacre of 1622, in which 347 people outside of Jamestown died. Rolfe may have died due to sickness.

=== Varina settlement ===
After the massacre, Henricus was no longer a settlement and the village of Varina was established on the Varina plantation. Varina covered an area of 18 by 25 miles, but it later became known as Henrico. After that, Varina was generally referred to the plantation. It became the county seat of Henrico. A courthouse was built there. Much of Varina Plantation was incorporated into the glebe lands of Henrico Parish. By 1640, church, courthouse, and other buildings were built either on the Varina plantation or in the settlement of Varina, but their location is unknown. (Note: Buildings in Varina, perhaps at Varina plantation, may include: By 1640, it was the site of the Henrico Parish glebe. In 1666, the first courthouse was built at Varina for Henrico County. From 1685 to 1694, Rev. James Blair was the minister at Varina Parish. He was made College of William & Mary's first rector in 1694 and was one of the founders of the school. After Blair, William Stith lived at the glebe at Varina.) In the mid-1600s, Varina was split. Part of it remained with the Rolfe family and ultimately was owned by the great-grandson of John Rolfe, Col. John Bolling (1676-1729), the son of Jane Rolfe and Colonel Robert Bolling. Nathaniel Bacon acquired another tract.

=== Plantation owners ===
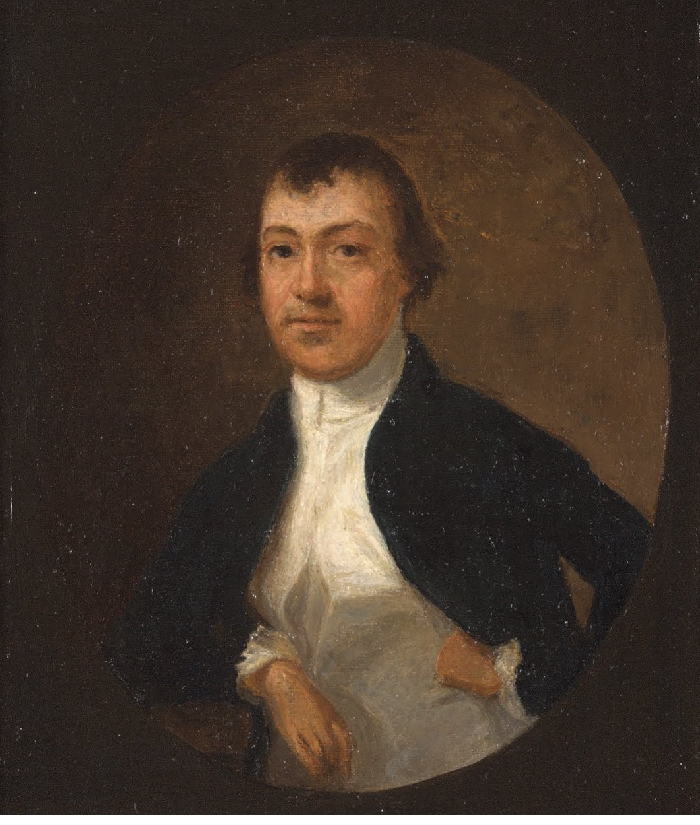
Thomas Mann Randolph Jr., Governor of Virginia, husband of Martha Jefferson Randolph, and son-in-law of Thomas Jefferson.

Most of the plantation property was bought by the Randolph family of Virginia. Thomas Mann Randolph Sr. bought land at Varina for his son, Thomas Mann Randolph Jr., who made it into a profitable plantation. Randolph was the 14th governor of Virginia. His wife, Martha, was the daughter of Thomas Jefferson. Randolph sold the plantation in 1825 to Pleasant Akin or Aiken of Petersburg. The present Classical Revival style mansion was built from 1853 to 1855, (Note: It appears that the house was built over two years, from the description of part of the house built in 1853 on p.2 and then said that the residence was built (perhaps completed) in 1855.) by Aiken's son, Albert M. Aiken. By the Civil War (1861–1865), the plantation was called Aiken's Landing, and it was a place where prisoners of war were exchanged.

=== Civil War ===
Military bridge across James River at Aiken or Varina Landing was built during the Civil War

It was one of the two major Southern places for prisoner exchange. On August 3, 1862, 6,000 Union and Confederate soldiers were exchanged there. Union General Benjamin Butler and his troops engaged in a battle in 1864 that caused damage at the plantation and the area. The plantation house was hit by cannonballs and bullets, the evidence of which is found on the west wall of the house. A pontoon bridge was built by Union troops upstream of the house so that they could cross the river on their way to Richmond. Butler took over the plantation for his official headquarters and the house and cabin housed his staff. During that time, Butler, nicknamed "Dutch", led the effort to dig the Dutch Gap canal. Varina is located near a site of the (multi-site) Richmond National Battlefield Park.

=== Post-war ===
In 1876, James H. Caldwell purchased the plantation from Aiken family members. The property passed through several additional owners before it was bought in 1910 by Wilmer N. Stoneman, Sr. In 1977, it was owned by Wilmer N. Stoneman, Jr. who operated the farm using modern agricultural practices. In the late 1980s, the construction of the Varina-Enon Bridge—a cable-stayed bridge that carries Interstate 295 across the James River between Henrico County near Richmond and Chesterfield County—bisected the property. It opened to traffic in July 1990.

In 2023 and 2024, the Henrico County Board of Supervisors made agreements to purchase the site from the Stoneman family for historic and environmental preservation. With a total expenditure of $18.55 million, the purchase was the largest investment in land preservation in the county's history.

== Archaeology ==
The Virginia Historic Landmarks Commission has conducted surface investigations of Varina and have found evidence of prehistoric activity on the property, as well as artifacts from the 17th and 18th centuries. There is evidence of a colonial structure about 650 feet northeast of the main house, which was found during an archaeological study. There are other 17th and early 18th century buildings that may have been on the Varina plantation land, including, the Varina Church, the glebe house, the first Henrico County courthouse, a terminus for a ferry across the James River, and Cocke's Ordinary.
