= Poythress =

Poythress is a surname. Notable people with the surname include:

- Alex Poythress (born 1993), American-Ivorian basketball player for Maccabi Tel Aviv of the Israeli Premier Basketball League
- David Poythress (1943–2017), politician from the U.S. state of Georgia
- Rich Poythress (born 1987), American baseball first basemen
- Peter Poythress (1733-1878), Virginia planter and politician in the Revolutionary War era
- Vern Poythress (born 1946), American theologian
