= Richard Buck =

Richard Buck may refer to:

- Richard Buck (sprinter) (born 1986), British sprinter
- Richard Buck (chaplain), 17th century early American minister

== See also ==
- Richard Maurice Bucke
