= Jane Rolfe =

Granddaughter of Pocahontas

- Born: October 10, 1650; Varina, Colony of Virginia, English Empire
- Died: January 27, 1676 (aged 25); Charles City County, Colony of Virginia, English Empire
- Resting place: Kippax Plantation
- Spouse: Robert Bolling
- Children: John Bolling
- Parent(s): Thomas Rolfe; Jane Poythress
- Relatives: John Rolfe (paternal grandfather); Pocahontas (paternal grandmother)

Jane Rolfe (October 10, 1650 – January 27, 1676) was the granddaughter of Pocahontas and English colonist John Rolfe (credited with introducing a strain of tobacco for export by the struggling Virginia Colony). Her husband was Colonel Robert Bolling, who lived from 1646 to 1709. Robert and Jane had one son, John Bolling (1676–1729).

== Biography ==
Jane Rolfe was born in Varina, Henrico County, Virginia on October 10, 1650 to Thomas Rolfe and his wife, Jane Poythress, whose parents were Francis Poythress and Alice Payton of England. Thomas Rolfe was the son of John Rolfe and his wife, Pocahontas.

Jane Rolfe married Robert Bolling of Prince George County, Virginia. Their son, John Bolling, was born on January 27, 1676. Jane is said to have died shortly after giving birth.

John Bolling married Mary Kennon, daughter of Richard Kennon and Elizabeth Worsham of Conjurer's Neck. The couple had six surviving children, each of whom married and had surviving children.

Jane Rolfe's interment was near her father in the Kippax Plantation, but her birth year was never engraved on her headstone.
