= Linebaugh =

Linebaugh is a surname, an Americanized spelling of the German surname Leinbach. Notable people with the surname include:

- Donald W. Linebaugh, American archaeologist
- John Linebaugh, American gunsmith
- Peter Linebaugh, American historian
