= Kippax Plantation =

Historic house in Virginia, United States

Coordinates: 37.28003519°N 77.3179847°W

- Kippax Plantation Archeological Site
- U.S. National Register of Historic Places
- Virginia Landmarks Register
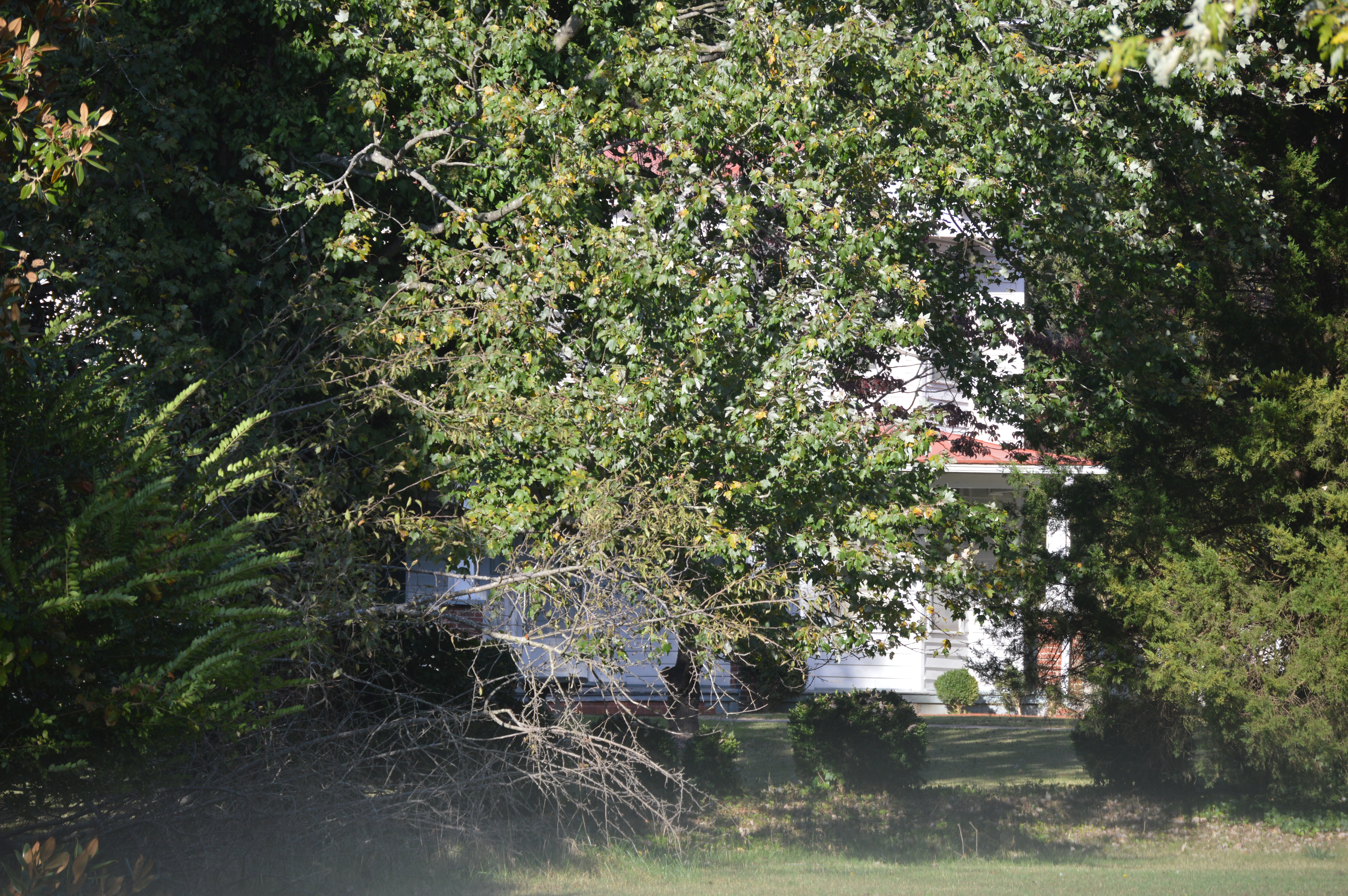
- Southern portion of the plantation, with the current house visible

- Location within Virginia Location within the United States
- Location: 999 Bland Ave, Hopewell, Virginia
- Area: 9.3 acres (3.8 ha)
- NRHP reference No.: 07000799
- VLR No.: 116-5021

Significant dates
- Added to NRHP: August 09, 2007
- Designated VLR: June 6, 2007

Kippax Plantation was located on the south bank of the Appomattox River in what is today the City of Hopewell in southeast Virginia. Kippax Plantation was the home of Colonel Robert Bolling (1646–1709). Bolling married Jane Rolfe, who was the granddaughter of Pocahontas and John Rolfe. Their only child, John Bolling was born at Kippax in 1676, and settled nearby at Cobbs Plantation, just west of Point of Rocks across the Appomattox River in what is now Chesterfield County. While Jane's father Thomas Rolfe (1615–1675) never lived at Kippax Plantation, it is believed that he was buried there, as were Robert and Jane.

Kippax Plantation is considered to be a well-preserved archaeological site that is also well documented. Archaeologist Donald W. Linebaugh, of the University of Kentucky, located the remains of Col. Bolling's house in Hopewell, Virginia in 2002.

Most of the current digging is performed at the site of the unearthed residence. Research by graduate students from the College of William and Mary, headed by Donald W. Linebaugh, have found the remains of at least four separate structures spanning the 17th, 18th, and 19th centuries at the Kippax site. These structures have the potential to answer important research questions regarding the history of early trade between Europeans and Native Americans, the lives of the African American slaves who lived there, and the cultural interaction between these groups.

The Archaeological Conservancy recently purchased the site of Kippax Plantation to protect it from development. Members of the Archaeological Conservancy are in the process of raising the $205,000 needed for the purchase.
