= Peter Poythress =

Politician of The Colony of Virginia

Member of the House of Delegates for Prince George County, Virginia
- In office 1776 Serving with Richard Bland
- Preceded by: position created
- Succeeded by: Edmund Ruffin

Member of the House of Burgesses for Prince George County
- In office 1768-1776 Serving with Richard Bland
- Preceded by: Alexander Bolling
- Succeeded by: position abolished

Personal details
- Born: circa 1733 Charles City County, Colony of Virginia
- Died: 1787 Charles City County, Virginia
- Resting place: unknown
- Spouse: Elizabeth Bland
- Children: William and 8 daughters
- Relatives: Elizabeth Cocke (mother), Robert Poythress (father), Elizabeth Gilliam (sister)

Peter Poythress (1733–1787) was a merchant, planter and politician who represented Prince George County alongside Richard Bland during the last eight years of the House of Burgesses, and in the first session of the Virginia House of Delegates, as well as in all five Virginia Revolutionary Conventions in between. Poythress resigned on October 17, 1776, citing ill health (although he survived nearly a decade), and on October 26, 1776 his co-legislator (and father-in-law) Richard Bland suffered a heart attack on a Williamsburg street during the legislative session and soon died.

== Ancestry and distinguishing contemporary of same name ==
This boy's name probably reflects a paternal ancestor who had emigrated to the Virginia colony more than a century earlier, and whose daughter Jane had married Thomas Rolfe and lived at Kippax Plantation near the important harbor town of City Point in what in 1702 became Prince George County. Several subsequent family members shared the same name, and destruction of this county's records during the Revolutionary War as well as Richmond's Confederate Evacuation Fire in April 1865 complicated matters (although some records survived if also filed in another county or held by family members). This Peter Poythress of "Branchester" plantation in Price George County was borne to the First Families of Virginia, the son of the former Elizabeth Cocke and her husband Robert Poythress of Martin's Brandon parish (also in Prince George County). His father had been accused of selling ammunition to Native Americans in 1713 and left a will in 1743 naming this man and many siblings (four brothers who died unmarried and three daughters who married, as well as two who died unmarried). His sister Jane Poythress married Scottish emigrant and Petersburg merchant John Baird whose "John Baird & Company" included this man, William McWhann and Gray Briggs.

Complicating matters, another Peter Poythress (b. 1686, whose life probably only briefly overlapped with this man), was associated with "Fleur de Hundred" plantation (possibly Flowerdew Hundred Plantation, with a house built by William Poythress around 1780). Several authors of early 20th century including Lyon Gardiner Tyler) have combined both men. That Peter Poythress in 1721 (more than a decade before this boy's birth) purchased from Adam Ivie a gristmill near Garysville which survived until the 1930s (but would be known under various names including "Bland's Mill", "Cocke's Mill", "Taylor's Mill" and "Hargrave's Mill"). That man married a cousin and had a single daughter, Anne (1712-1758), who married Richard Bland of Jordan's Point plantation (who would be this man's co-burgess in the House of Burgesses) and bore a dozen children (including six sons, this man's wife and five additional daughters) before her death a decade before this man began his legislative career. Thus this earlier Peter Poythress was this man's grandfather-in-law (if such term exists). A still earlier Peter Poythress was the younger son of John Poythress and had an elder brother Col. William Poythress whose son and heir Richard Poythress married his brother's daughter.

== Career ==
Prince George county voters elected this patriot numerous times, and he served in the House of Burgesses, all five Virginia Revolutionary Conventions, and in the first session of the Virginia House of Delegates—all alongside his father-in-law Richard Bland. Poythress was later reimbursed for foodstuffs provided to the Continental Army. In 1782 Poythress paid taxes on his overseer John Lamb as well as on two plantations in Dinwiddie County (which had been created in 1752 from western Prince George County), one encompassing six enslaved adults and eleven children and the other twelve enslaved adults and fourteen children. Following the destruction of the American Revolutionary War, Peter Poythress was one of the replacement trustees for the town of Blandford (and his legislative successor Edmund Ruffin was another of the new trustees for the town now incorporated into Petersburg).

== Personal life, death and legacy ==
This man married Elizabeth Bland (b. 1732), the firstborn daughter of his co-burgess, who bore a son (William Poythress) who was underage at the time of his father's death but who married in 1787 (the next year). This Peter Poythress wrote a will in October 1785, which was admitted to probate in January 1786. William had eight sisters, all of whom ultimately married, but of whom only three were considered legal adults at the time of their father's death. Elizabeth Poythress (b. 1759) married William Mayo of "Powhatan Seat" in Powhatan County (who served in the State Line in the Revolutionary War); Ann Poythress married John Randolph and Mary Poythress married John Batte. The sisters who were underage but later married included: Susanna Poythress who ultimately married Richard Bland III, Sally Bland Poythress who married Richard Lee and after his death Capt. Willoughby Newton; Agnes Poythress who married Roger Atkinson, Jane Poythress who married Maj. Joseph Mayo, and Lucy Bland Poythress who married Capt. John Eppes of Eppesville.
