= Benoni (given name) =

Benoni is the original name of the biblical Benjamin. It is the given name of:

- Benoni Aubert (1768–1832), Norwegian surveyor and soldier
- Benoni Beheyt (born 1940), Belgian former road bicycle racer
- Benoni Buck (1616–1639), the first reported case of intellectual disability in the American colonies
- Benoni Danks (c. 1710–1776), officer in the French and Indian War and member of the Nova Scotia House of Assembly
- Benoni d'Entremont (c. 1745–1841), mariner, shipbuilder, office holder, justice of the peace and militia officer in Nova Scotia
- Benoni S. Fuller (1825–1903), American politician
- Benoni Hall (1710–1779), Rhode Island surveyor and justice of the Colonial Rhode Island Supreme Court
- Benoni Irwin (1840–1896), American portrait painter
- Benoni Ogwal (born 1942), Anglican bishop in Uganda
- Benoni Reynolds (1824–1911), American politician
- Benoni Urey (born 1957), Americo-Liberian businessman and politician
- Benoni Whitten (died 1883), American attorney and Oregon Supreme Court associate justice
