= Alexander Whitaker =

English Anglican theologian (1585-1616)

The Reverend Alexander Whitaker
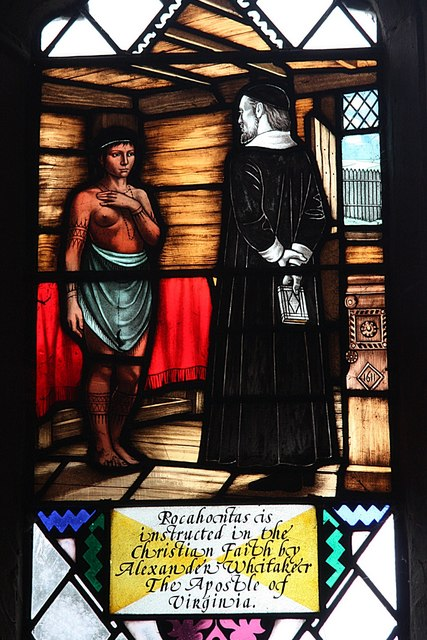
- Whitaker and Pocahontas depicted on a stained glass window
- Born: 1585; Cambridge, England
- Died: 1616 (aged 30–31); James River, Virginia Colony
- Other name: Alexander Whiteaker
- Occupation: Anglican theologian
- Notable work: Good Newes from Virginia (1613)

Alexander Whitaker (1585–1616) was an English Anglican theologian who settled in North America in Virginia Colony in 1611 and established two churches near the Jamestown colony. He was also known as "The Apostle of Virginia" by contemporaries.

== Biography ==
Born in Cambridge, he was the son of William Whitaker (1548–1595), Protestant scholar and Master of St. John's College, Cambridge. Whitaker was educated at Trinity College, Cambridge and became a clergyman in the North of England.

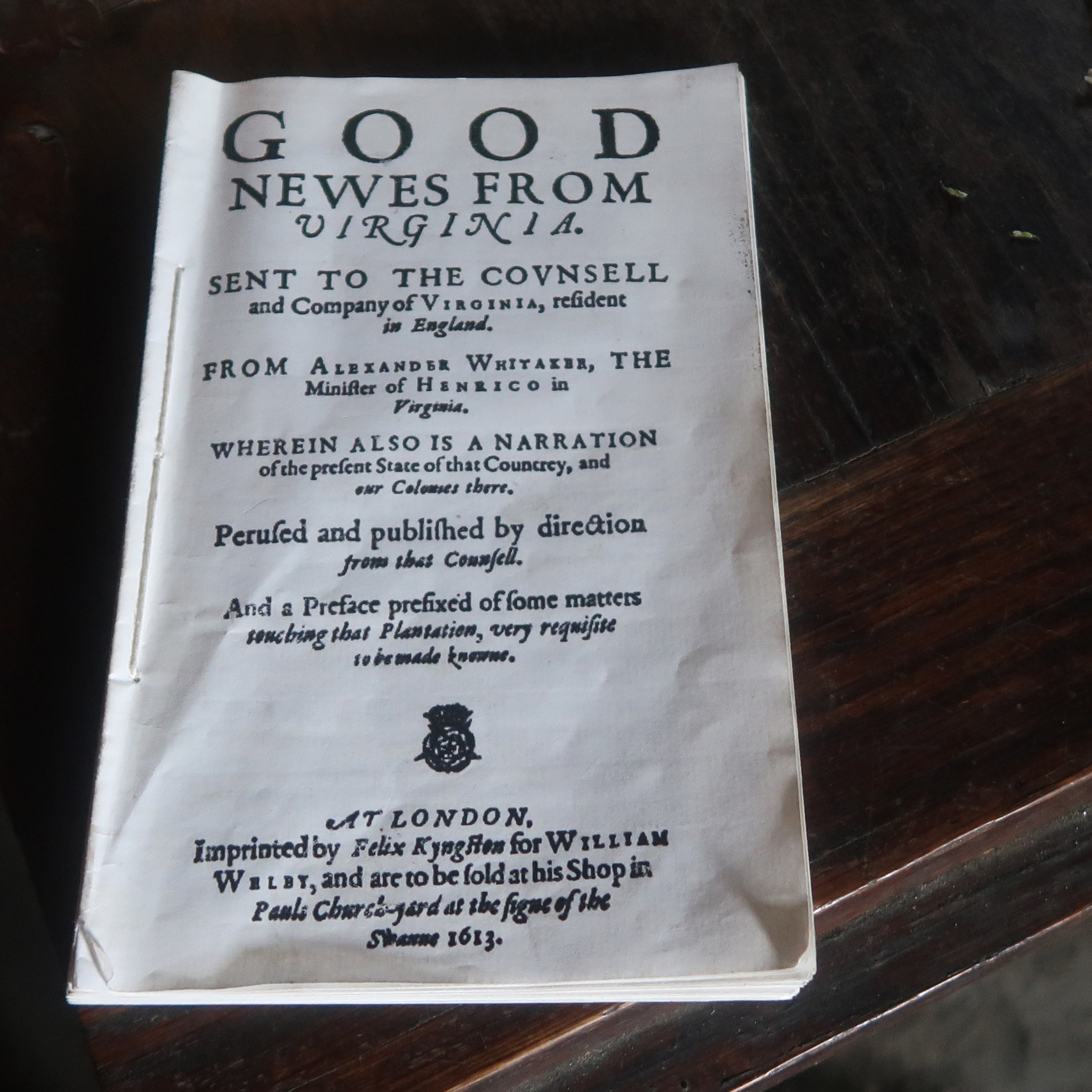
Good Newes from Virginia, 1613

Travelling to Virginia in 1611, he was a popular religious leader with both settlers and natives, and was responsible for the baptism and conversion of Pocahontas at Henricus two years later. She took the baptismal name "Rebecca". Richard Buck presided at her marriage to John Rolfe on April 5, 1614. His relative tolerance of the Native American population that English colonists encountered can be found in his sermons, some of which were sent back to England to help win support for the new colonies in North America. The most famous of these sermons is Good Newes from Virginia (1613), in which he describes the native population as "servants of sinne and slaves of the divill," but also recognizes them as "sons of Adam," who are "a very understanding generation, quicke of apprehension, suddaine in their despatches, subtile in their dealings, exquisite in their inventions, and industrious in their labour."

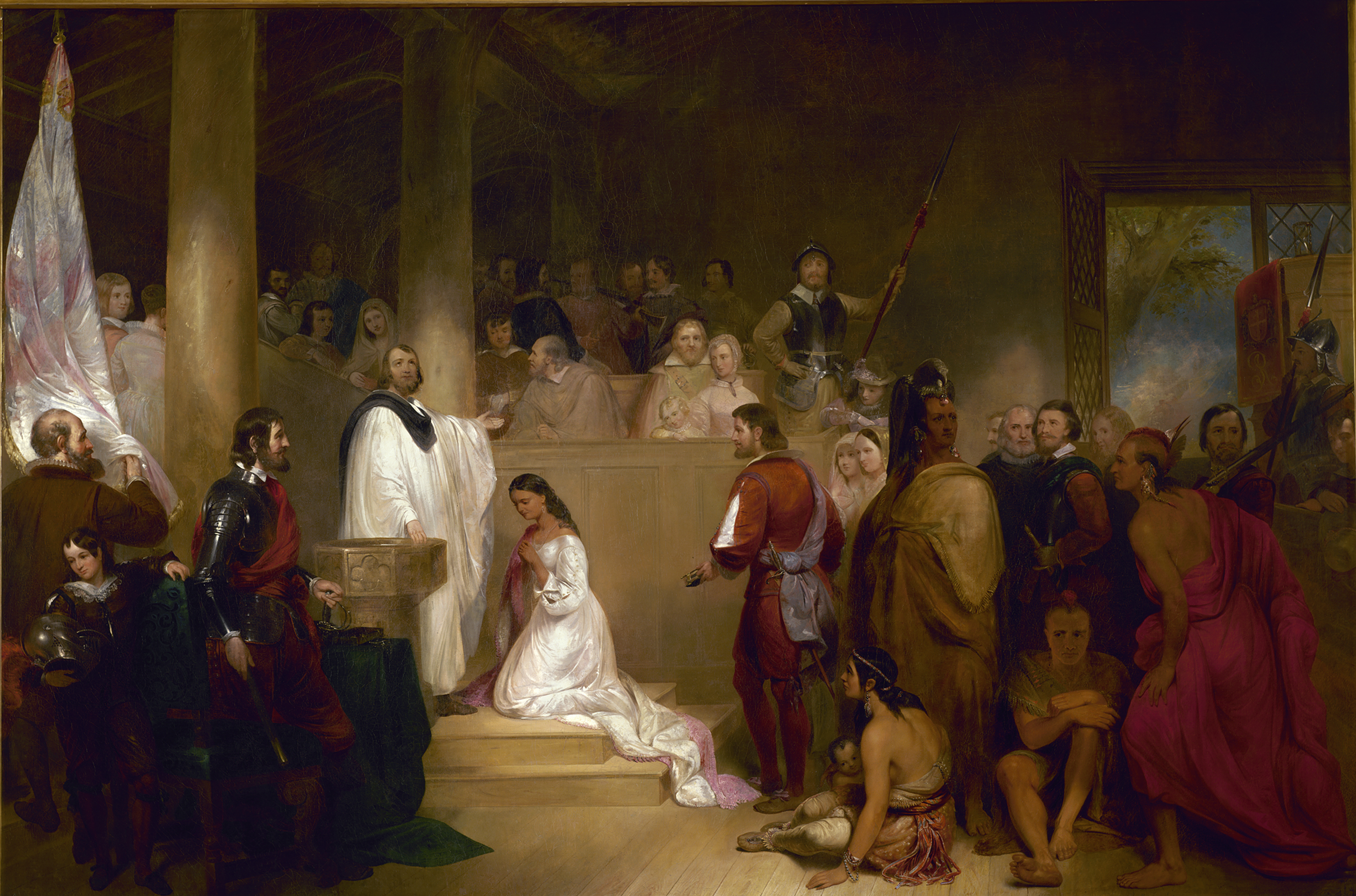
Whitaker (left, in white vestments) as portrayed in Baptism of Pocahontas, 1840, by John Gadsby Chapman

Before leaving England, Whitaker had crossed paths with a York merchant who later became an English naval captain and explorer of New England, Christopher Levett of York. In Whitaker's will of 1610, and proved following his death in 1616, Whitaker noted that he owed "Christopher Levite, a linen draper of the city of York" just over £5. Trained as a York merchant, Levett later founded the first settlement at Portland, Maine, where he was granted 6,000 acres (24 km^{2}) by the King. The settlement failed.

Whitaker drowned in 1616 while crossing the James River.
