= Sedgeford Hall Portrait =

19th century painting

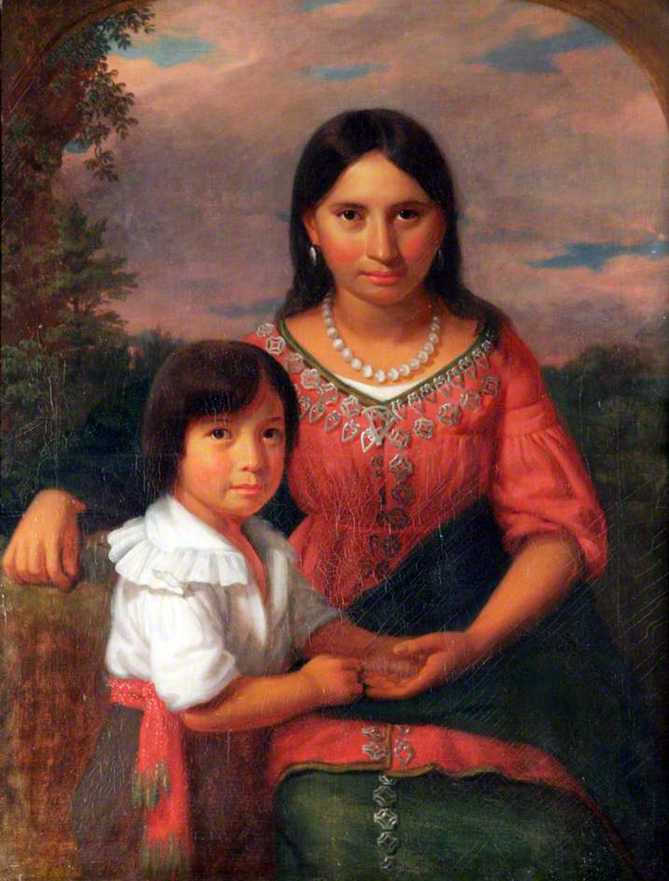
The "Sedgeford Hall Portrait," oil on canvas by unknown artist circa 1837; courtesy of Borough Council of King’s Lynn and West Norfolk, UK

The "Sedgeford Hall Portrait" (location: King's Lynn Town Hall, Norfolk, UK) is an oil on canvas portrait in the American School by an unknown artist circa 1837. It depicts Pe-o-ka, wife of the Seminole leader, Osceola, and their son. It was once mistakenly believed by many to be a portrait painted from life of Pocahontas and her son, Thomas Rolfe.

== Provenance and identification ==
Eustace Neville Rolfe of Heacham in Norfolk, a possible distant relative of Thomas, acquired the painting, believing it to be of Pocahontas and Thomas. At some point it was hung in a Rolfe family estate building called Sedgeford Hall in Sedgeford (Norfolk, England), from whence it acquired its name. Art experts later disputed the painting's origin, saying it could not have been painted during the lifetime of Pocahontas on the basis of style and the sitters' dress. Additionally, the child in the portrait appears to be several years older than Thomas Rolfe would have been when his mother was still alive. Thomas Rolfe was born in January 1615, making him two years, two months old at the time of Pocahontas's death.

In 2010, researcher Bill Ryan, while reviewing magazine archives on the Seminole Indians, found a black-and-white drawn version of the painting in the 1848 edition of Illustrated London News identifying the portrait as "the wife and child of Osceola, the last of the Seminole Indian chiefs." Osceola himself was of mixed race (Creek Indian and English), which explains the European features of the child. The portrait is now generally accepted as being his wife and son, though some questions still remain. Many printed and Internet sources, however, still refer to this painting as a portrait of Pocahontas and Thomas Rolfe.

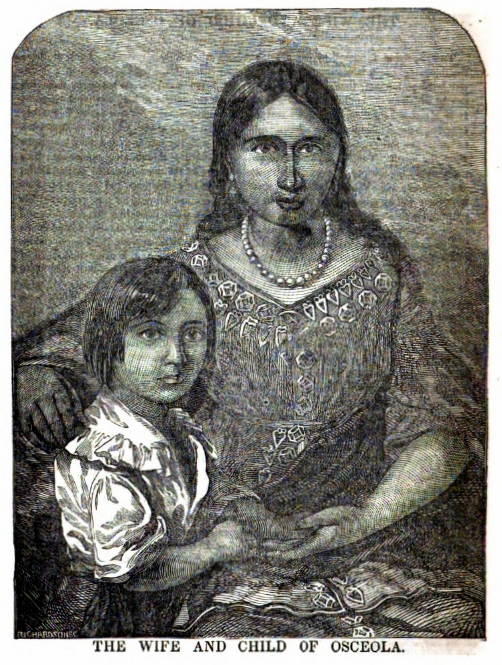
"The Wife and Child of Osceola" from Holden's Dollar Magazine, volume 6, no. 4 (October 1850): 591-592.

An article from Holden's Dollar Magazine in 1850 labels the engraving "The Wife and Child of Osceola" and bemoans the loss of the continent's native peoples.

A plaque, presumably composed by the Rolfe family, is attached to the frame stating:

PRINCESS POCAHONTAS
Dau. of PRINCE POWHATTAN & 2nd WIFE of
JOHN ROLFE of HEACHAM (1585-1630)
b. 1595 m.1614 d. AT GRAVESEND 1617

The plaque contains some questionable information besides the likely misidentification of the subjects. Pocahontas was said to be a "princess" by members of the Virginia Company who marketed her as such to investors and to the royal family during her trip to England in 1616-1617. While she was the daughter of Powhatan, she was not in a matrilineal line to succeed him, and the Powhatan Indians are not known to have given her any special title corresponding to the English notion of princess, though she was likely treated with respect as the daughter of Powhatan. Further, John Rolfe is often said to be John Rolfe of Heacham, but this has been questioned. Finally, the stated birth year of 1595 is an estimate. Anthropologist and Powhatan Indian researcher Helen Rountree estimates her birth year to have been 1596 based on Pocahontas's statement of how old she was at the time of the Simon van de Passe engraving.

A sign posted under the painting at King's Lynn Town Hall gives some brief biographical details of the life of Pocahontas as well as this paragraph explaining the mis-identification of the painting's subjects:

- "The mother and child portrayed are probably Pe-o-ka, the wife of Osceola, the War Chief of the Seminoles of Florida, and their child in 1837. It was acquired by Eustace Neville Rolfe of Heacham Hall who believed it represented Pocahontas and her son."

Additional details

- "[The Sedgeford Hall Portrait] was purchased by Eustace Neville Rolfe (1845–1908) of Heacham Hall from a Mrs Charlton who stated that ‘her husband had bought it in America years ago'."
- "A founder member of the King’s Lynn Town Guides, Mrs Jill Price, and her husband, encouraged the Rolfe family to hang the painting in the [King's Lynn] Town Hall. It was presented and hung in 1990."
