= Henricus =

Archaeological site in Virginia, United States

Henricus Henricopolis, Henrie Town, Henrico
- Town
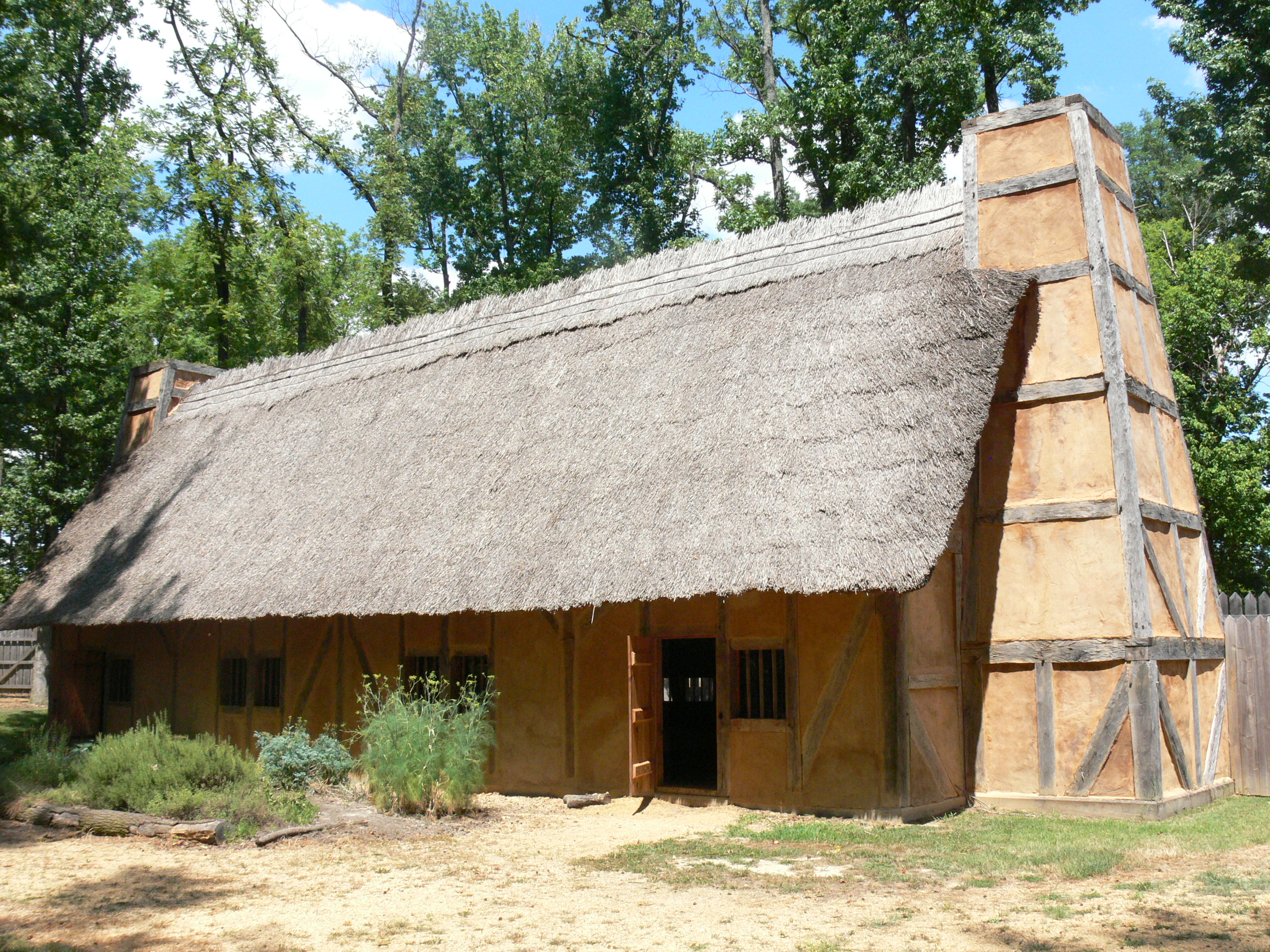
- Reconstruction of Mt. Malady, the first English hospital in America
- Interactive map of Henricus
- Coordinates: 37.374°N 77.362°W
- Present Country: United States
- State: Virginia
- Counties: Chesterfield, Henrico
- Established: 1611; 415 years ago
- Abandoned: by 1622
- Founder: Thomas Dale
- Named for: Henry Frederick, Prince of Wales
- Henrico
- U.S. National Register of Historic Places
- Virginia Landmarks Register
- Location within Virginia Location within the United States
- Nearest city: Dutch Gap, Chesterfield County, Virginia
- Area: 12 acres (4.9 ha)
- Built: 1611
- NRHP reference No.: 72001400
- VLR No.: 020-0709

Significant dates
- Added to NRHP: April 13, 1972
- Designated VLR: December 21, 1971

The "Citie of Henricus"—also known as Henricopolis, Henrico Town, or Henrico—was a settlement in Virginia founded by Sir Thomas Dale in 1611 as an alternative to the swampy and dangerous site of the original English settlement at Jamestown. Named for Henry Frederick, Prince of Wales (1594–1612), the eldest son of King James I of England, Henricus was located on a former meander of the James River, about 12 miles (19 km) southeast of present-day Richmond, Virginia, and about 15 miles (24 km) below the fall line.

Today, the site is preserved and interpreted at Henricus Historical Park, a living history museum. It is surrounded by the Dutch Gap Conservation Area, an 810-acre (330 ha) preserve of woodlands and wetlands operated by Chesterfield County. Captain Dale, who had previously served as a mercenary with Dutch forces, ordered a channel dug across the neck of the river meander in an attempt to shorten navigation; the effort was unsuccessful and gave rise to the name "Dutch Gap". During the American Civil War, the canal was enlarged by Union forces, creating Farrar's Island. Subsequent dredging in the late 19th century diverted the main channel of the James River through the canal. The park and conservation area are located on the Captain John Smith Chesapeake National Historic Trail.

== History ==
The second successful English settlement in the New World, Henricus was opposite the American Indian village of Arrohateck. At the time, the First Anglo-Powhatan War was raging, and Powhatan forces offered continuous resistance to English colonial settlement, largely orchestrated by native leader Nemattanew, or as the colonists knew him, "Jack-of-the-Feather". Before the development of Richmond, Henricus was one of the westernmost outlying settlements of the Colony of Virginia from its fortified capital at Jamestown. In 1612–1613, a facility known as "Mt. Malady" was built nearby; it was the first hospital in the English colonies of North America.

Pocahontas, daughter of Powhatan, Mamanatowick of the Powhatan Confederacy, was held captive at Henricus under Sir Thomas Dale, deputy governor of the colony. Reverend Alexander Whitaker converted her to Christianity during her captivity. She met colonist John Rolfe during this time, and they married on April 5, 1614. Rolfe's longtime friend, Richard Buck, presided at their wedding. Their son, Thomas Rolfe (named for Sir Thomas Dale, deputy governor of the colony of Virginia), was born in 1615. His descendants were among many of the First Families of Virginia (FFV).

=== Proposed college at Henricus ===
The Virginia Company tried to found the first institution of higher education in British America. In 1618, they obtained a royal charter from King James I of England for a proposed University of Henrico. In 1619, the historic First Virginia General Assembly met at Jamestown and passed its fifth petition, "Send men to erect the Colledge", describing the proposed institution as "A worke of Conversion", and set aside land for it adjacent to and above Henricus. In 1619, Henricus was also incorporated into the City of Henrico. The fort was abandoned by governor's orders during the Indian massacre of 1622, and largely destroyed by the Powhatan afterwards.

By 1623, more settlers occupied the college land than before the massacre. The next year, James I dissolved the Virginia Company, seizing its assets and transforming the proprietary colony into a royal colony. The Crown controlled the colony from then on.

=== End of colonial era ===
Henricus became part of the Shire of Henrico (created 1634) and was renamed Henrico County in 1637. Virginia Company stockholder William Farrar acquired the property in 1637 and his descendants sold it to Thomas Randolph in 1737. Meanwhile, in 1693, the College of William and Mary was established in Williamsburg under a new charter granted by the joint English monarchs King William III and Queen Mary II. A plaque on the Wren Building, the college's first structure, ascribes the institution's origin to "the college proposed at Henrico".

== Modern era ==
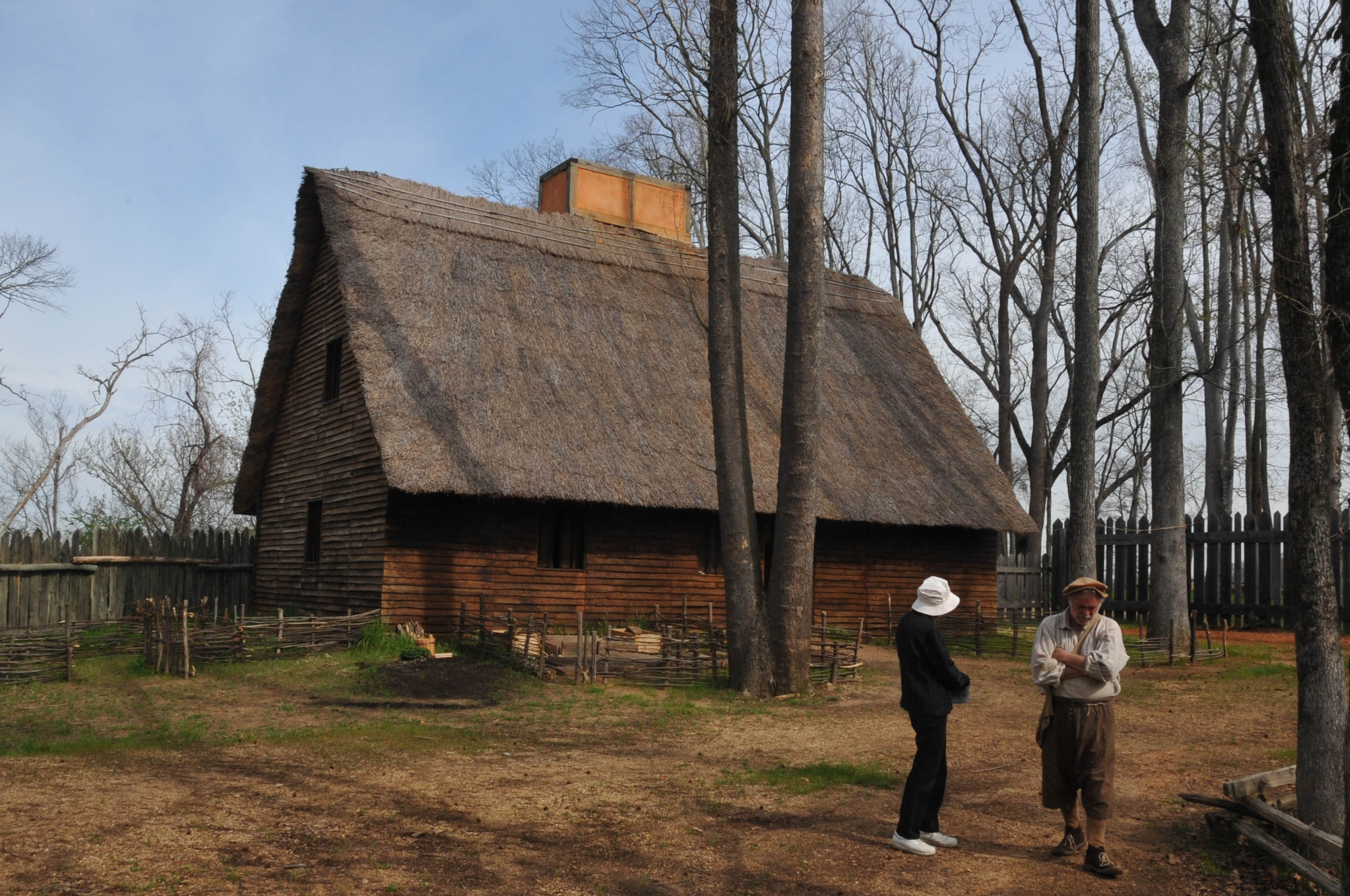
Reconstructed settler's house

The area later saw action during the American Revolutionary War. During the American Civil War, it played a minor role in the Bermuda Hundred Campaign, and in 1865 the Battle of Trent's Reach, one of the last major naval engagements of the conflict, was fought offshore. In the interim, Union General Benjamin Butler ordered troops to excavate the narrow neck of Farrar's Island, on which Henricus was located, to create the Dutch Gap Canal in an attempt to bypass Confederate artillery batteries along the James River. The channel was widened in 1870 and became the main channel of the James River, while the former river channel silted up to form what is now the 810-acre (3.3 km^{2}) Dutch Gap Conservation Area.

In 1922, Chesterfield County annexed the former location of Henricus south of the Dutch Gap Canal from Henrico County.

The area became used for sand and gravel mining, and sunken ships are still visible in the lagoon. Dominion Energy still operates Chesterfield Power Station, with controversial coal ash lagoons adjoining the Dutch Gap Conservation area.

Over time, the exact location of the former town of Henricus became uncertain. After archeological excavations, the U.S. National Register of Historic Places in 1972 listed the 12-acre (4.9 ha) archeological site in Chesterfield County as Henrico. Though archaeological evidence of the actual settlement has not been found (due to the creation of Dutch Gap and other disturbances including the nearby quarries), a reconstruction based on historical evidence of the settlement was created nearby as a living history museum, Henricus Historical Park.
