= Benoni Buck =

American colonist with an intellecutal disability

- Born: 1616; Jamestown, Virginia
- Died: 1639 (age 23); Jamestown, Virginia
- Known for: First person with a intellectual disability in British America

Benoni Buck (1616–1639) was a second-generation colonist in Jamestown, James City, Virginia, and is notable as the first documented case of a person with an intellectual disability in the Colonial United States. His life and legal battles over his guardianship provide significant insight into the early American legal and social treatment of individuals with disabilities.

== Early life ==
Buck was born as the sixth child to Richard Buck (chaplain) and Elizabeth Langley (Brown) Buck. His siblings were Elizabeth, Bridget, Mara, Gercian, and Peleg. Named Benoni, which translates to "child of sorrow," he lived during a time when disabilities were poorly understood and often stigmatized.

== Guardianship and legal disputes ==
From 1624 to 1626, Thomas Alnutt held the guardianship of Buck, during which time Buck was likely under the care of Peter and Mary Langman, indentured servants to Alnutt. His exact whereabouts often remained ambiguous, with records suggesting he might have lived in Neck-of-Land with the Kingsmills, Langmans, Harmers, Porters, or Burrows.

In 1637, Ambrose Harmer controversially obtained guardianship by petitioning King Charles and the Court of Wards and Liveries, sidestepping local legal procedures. Despite lacking solid evidence or thorough examinations of Buck's condition, the petition was granted. Harmer stated Buck was "an Idiot, (Note: Note that the term "idiot" is now considered ableist, historically it was used both clinically and colloquially to refer to people with intellectual and developmental disabilities.) and in no way able to govern himself, or to manage that small estate left him". This act was criticized, with later revelations of Harmer's mismanagement and exploitation of Buck's estate. In 1639, Virginia governor John Harvey noted that Harmer and his wife had long coveted the land, underlining the manipulative intent behind obtaining the guardianship.

== Death and legacy ==
Buck died in 1639 at the age of 23. His death was undocumented, and Harmar retained control over his portion of the Buck estate. The guardianship battles surrounding Buck highlighted the colonial desire to accumulate wealth through the manipulation of legal and custodial systems, often at the expense of the vulnerable.

The legal and cultural handling of Buck’s case set a precedent for guardianship laws, showcasing how legal systems could both protect and exploit individuals with disabilities. His story, primarily known through third-party reports and lacking personal testimonies, remains a critical example of early American legal practices concerning individuals with intellectual disabilities.
