= John Rolfe =

English-born explorer, farmer, and merchant

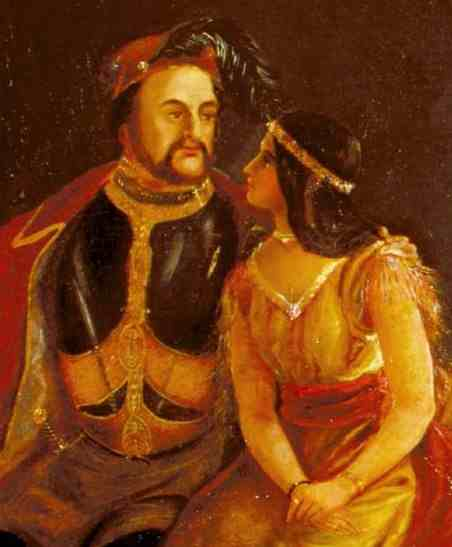
- A posthumous painting of John Rolfe and Pocahontas made c. 1850
- Born: c. 1585; Heacham, Norfolk, England
- Died: March 1622 (aged 36–37); Varina Farms, Virginia
- Occupations: Farmer, merchant, explorer
- Known for: Being the husband of Pocahontas and the first settler in the colony of Virginia to successfully cultivate a tobacco crop for export
- Spouses: Sarah Hacker (m. 1608; died 1610) Pocahontas (m. 1614; died 1617) Jane Pierce (m. 1619)
- Children: Bermuda Rolfe (1609–1610); Thomas Rolfe (1615–1680); Elizabeth Rolfe (1620–1635)

John Rolfe (c. 1585 – March 1622) was an English explorer, tobacco farmer and merchant. He was the husband of Pocahontas and the first settler in the colony of Virginia to successfully cultivate a tobacco crop for export.

He played a crucial role in the Virginia Colony's early economy by introducing a sweeter strain of tobacco from Trinidad, which became a profitable cash crop. Rolfe married Pocahontas, daughter of Native American leader Powhatan, and they had a son named Thomas. Rolfe and Pocahontas traveled to England in 1616 to promote colonization and investment in Virginia. After Pocahontas died, Rolfe returned to Virginia and continued working with tobacco. The tobacco strain cultivated by Rolfe laid the foundation for Virginia's thriving tobacco industry.

== Early life ==
The birthplace of John Rolfe, born c. 1585, remains unproven. (Family history documents show that John was born in Heacham Hall, Norfolk, England on May 6, 1585.) At that time, the Spanish Empire held a virtual monopoly on the lucrative tobacco trade. Most Spanish colonies in the Americas were located in South America and the West Indies, which were more favorable to tobacco growth than their English counterparts (founded in the early 17th century, notably Jamestown in 1607). As the consumption of tobacco had increased, the balance of trade between England and Spain began to be seriously affected. Rolfe was one of a number of businessmen who saw the opportunity to undercut Spanish imports by growing tobacco in England's new colony in Virginia. He had illegally obtained seeds to take with him from a special popular strain, then being grown in Trinidad, South America, even though Spain had declared a penalty of death to anyone selling such seeds to a non-Spaniard.

At one point in time it was believed that John was the son of John Rolfe and his wife Dorothy Mason. However, historians have now determined that this relationship is incorrect. One major inconsistency that shows they are not his parents is that John is known to have had a brother named Henry. After John's death, his brother Henry Rolfe petitioned the Virginia Company for funds from John's Virginia estate, to help pay for the care of John's son Thomas Rolfe who was then in Henry's care. Dorothy Mason and her husband John Rolfe are not known to have had a son named Henry.

=== Sailing with Third Supply to Virginia ===
A project of the proprietary Virginia Company of London, Jamestown had been established by an initial group of settlers on 14 May 1607. This colony proved as troubled as earlier English settlements. Two return trips with supplies by Christopher Newport arrived in 1608, while another large relief fleet was dispatched in 1609, carrying hundreds of new settlers and supplies across the Atlantic. Heading the Third Supply fleet was the new flagship of the Virginia Company, the Sea Venture, carrying Rolfe and his wife, Sarah.

The Third Supply fleet left England in May 1609 destined for Jamestown with seven large ships, towing two smaller pinnaces. In the southern region of the North Atlantic, they encountered a three-day-long storm, thought to have been a severe hurricane. The ships of the fleet became separated. The Sea Venture was taking on water faster than it could be bailed. The admiral of the company, Sir George Somers, took the helm and the ship was deliberately driven onto the reefs of Bermuda to prevent its foundering. All aboard, 150 passengers and crew, and one dog, survived.

Most remained for ten months in Bermuda (also known as The Somers Isles) while they built two small ships to continue the voyage to Jamestown. A number of passengers and crew, however, did not complete this journey. Some had died or been killed, lost at sea (the Sea Venture's long boat had been fitted with a sail, and several men sent to take word to Jamestown, and they were never heard from again), or left behind to maintain England's claim to Bermuda. Because of this, although the Virginia Company's charter was not extended to Bermuda until 1612, the Colony at Bermuda dates its settlement from 1609. Among those left buried in Bermuda were Bermuda Rolfe, the daughter of John.

In May 1610, the two newly constructed ships set sail from Bermuda, with 142 castaways on board, including Rolfe, George Somers, Stephen Hopkins, and Sir Thomas Gates. On arrival at Jamestown, they found the Virginia Colony almost destroyed by famine and disease during what has become known as the Starving Time. Very few supplies from the Third Supply had arrived because the same hurricane that caught the Sea Venture badly affected the rest of the fleet. Only 60 settlers remained alive. It was only through the arrival of the two small ships from Bermuda, and the arrival of another relief fleet commanded by Lord De La Warr on 10 June 1610, that the abandonment of Jamestown was avoided and the colony survived. After finally settling in Rolfe began his long-delayed work with tobacco.

=== Orinoco tobacco: a cash crop ===
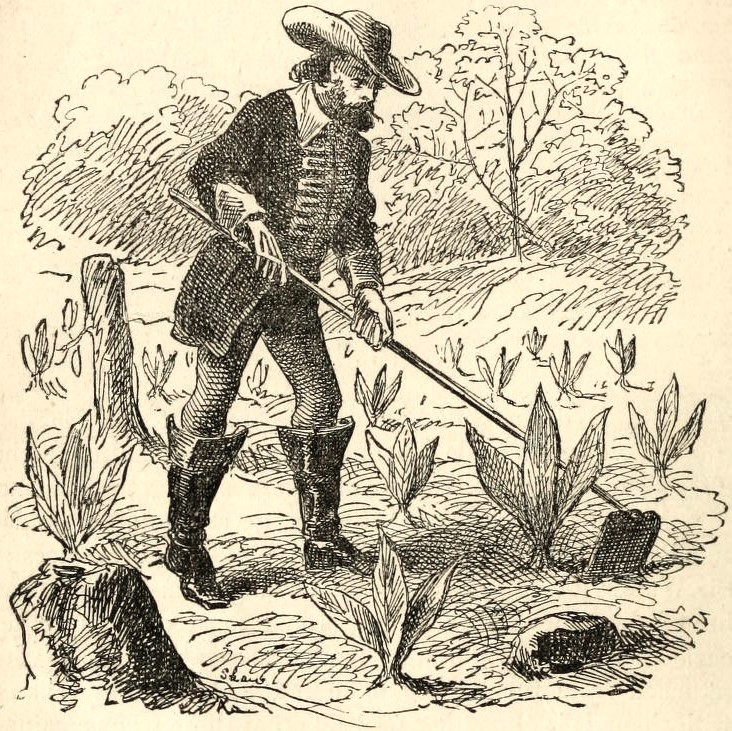
Rolfe cultivating tobacco, as illustrated in 1874

In competing with Spain for European markets, there was another problem beside the warmer climates the Spanish settlements enjoyed. The native tobacco from Virginia (Nicotiana rustica) was not liked by the English settlers, nor did it appeal to the market in England. However, Rolfe wanted to introduce sweeter strains from Trinidad, using the hard-to-obtain Spanish seeds he brought with him. In 1611, he was the first to commercially cultivate Nicotiana tabacum tobacco plants in North America; export of this sweeter tobacco beginning in 1612 helped turn the Virginia Colony into a profitable venture. He named his Virginia-grown strain of the tobacco "Orinoco", possibly in honour of tobacco popularizer Sir Walter Raleigh's expeditions in the 1580s up the Orinoco River in Guiana in search of the legendary City of Gold, El Dorado. The appeal of Orinoco tobacco was in its nicotine, and the conviviality of its use in social situations.

In 1612, Rolfe established Varina Farms, a plantation along the James River about 30 miles (50 km) upstream from Jamestown and across the river from Sir Thomas Dale's progressive development at Henricus. The first harvest of four barrels of tobacco leaf was exported from Virginia to England in March 1614. Soon afterwards, Rolfe and others were exporting vast quantities of the new cash crop. New plantations began growing along the James River, where export shipments could use wharves along the river.

=== Pocahontas ===
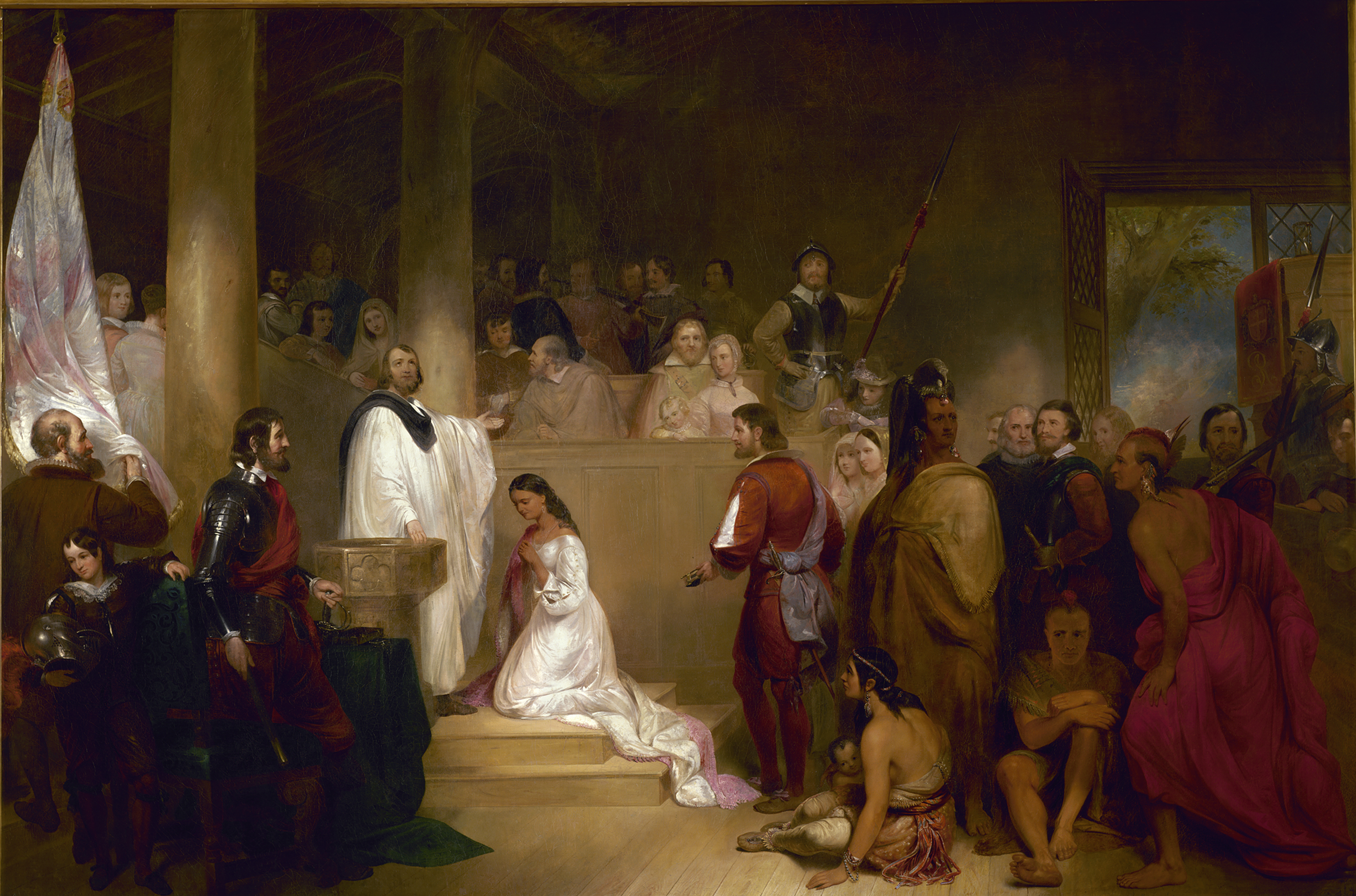
Rolfe (right, standing behind Pocahontas) as portrayed in Baptism of Pocahontas, 1840, by John Gadsby Chapman

Rolfe married Pocahontas, daughter of the local Native American leader Powhatan, on 5 April 1614. Earlier that same year, Pocahontas chose to convert to Christianity; she was baptized by Alexander Whitaker and chose "Rebecca" as her new baptismal name. Richard Buck officiated their wedding. Their son, Thomas Rolfe, was born in January 1615.

John Rolfe and Pocahontas continued cultivating tobacco with success. In 1616 they were sent to England as guests of the Virginia Company to promote colonization and investment in Virginia. They were accompanied by baby Thomas as well as by the deputy governor of the colony, Sir Thomas Dale, and 12 members of Pocahontas' tribe, including her brother-in-law Uttamatomakkin. They sailed aboard the Treasurer', commanded by Captain Samuel Argall, and arrived in England in June 1616. They helped promote the colony and investment in the Virginia Company increased. During their visit, John Rolfe wrote "A True Relation of the State of Virginia Lefte by Sir Thomas Dale Knight in May Last 1616" The manuscript was published in 1617 and further touted the viability of the colony in Virginia. After nine months in England, the party prepared to return to Virginia but was delayed by bad weather. Finally setting sail in March 1617, the party had to make port in Gravesend because Pocahontas was gravely ill. Pocahontas died and was buried at St George's Church, Gravesend on 21 March 1617. Their small son Thomas was sick as well, it was determined he was too ill to survive a voyage. Pressured to return to Virginia, John Rolfe appointed Sir Lewis Stukley as temporary guardian to his son and returned to Virginia with Uttamatomakkin. Stukley had custody of Thomas Rolfe until his uncle Henry Rolfe could take over his care. It was intended that Thomas would return to Virginia once he recovered his health. Unfortunately, John Rolfe would never see his son again. Thomas did recover his health but remained in England until reaching adulthood.

=== Later life, death, and descendants ===
Rolfe returned to Virginia and resumed his work with tobacco. In 1617 20,000 pounds (9,100 kg) of Orinoco tobacco was sent to England; and in 1618, an additional 40,000 pounds were sent. Rolfe's letters to England in 1620 include the earliest mention of the first arrival of enslaved Africans to Virginia, who were brought by a Dutch man-of-war in August 1619 and were traded to the colony's governor for supplies.

About 1619, Rolfe married Jane Pierce, daughter of English colonist William Peirce, who had survived the shipwreck of the Sea Venture along with John in 1609. They had a daughter, Elizabeth, in 1620, who married John Milner of Nansemond, Virginia, and died in 1635. Rolfe died in 1622. He may have died in the Indian massacre of 1622, but the evidence is uncertain. His widow Jane later married English Captain Roger Smith.

The land given by Powhatan (now known as Smith's Fort Plantation, located in Surry County) was willed to Thomas Rolfe, who in 1640 sold at least a portion of it to Thomas Warren. Smith's Fort was a secondary Fort to Jamestown, begun in 1609 by John Smith.

Thomas Rolfe, who had grown up in England, returned to Virginia as an adult and married Jane Poythress. Poythress's English parents were Francis Poythress and Alice Payton. Thomas and Jane Rolfe had one child, Jane Rolfe, who married Robert Bolling and had a son, John Bolling, in 1676. Jane Rolfe died shortly after giving birth. John Bolling married Mary Kennon, daughter of Richard Kennon and Elizabeth Worsham of Conjurer's Neck. The couple had six surviving children, each of whom married and had surviving children.

== Popular culture ==
- In Disney's 1998 animated film Pocahontas II: Journey to a New World, Rolfe is voiced by Billy Zane.
- Rolfe is portrayed by Christian Bale in the 2005 film The New World.

== Legacy ==
- The strain of tobacco cultivated by Rolfe was the export cash crop that helped make the Virginia Colony profitable. It was the mainstay of the farming plantations for generations. Huge warehouses, such as those on Richmond's Tobacco Row, attest to its popularity. Even almost 400 years later, tobacco figures prominently in Virginia's economy.
- In eastern Virginia, State Route 31 is named the John Rolfe Highway. It links Williamsburg with Jamestown, the southern entrance to the Colonial Parkway, and via the Jamestown Ferry leads to the rich farming area of Surry County and Sussex County, ending in Wakefield, Virginia.
- John Rolfe Drive, in the town of Smithfield in Isle of Wight County, Virginia, connects Battery Park Road with Magruder Road, and is named for Rolfe.
- John Rolfe Middle School, in Henrico County, Virginia, one of Virginia's eight original shires of 1634, is named for him. Varina magisterial district in Henrico County is named for Rolfe's Varina Farms plantation, where the tiny village was also the first county seat (from 1634 to 1752).
- The abandoned corridor planned for State Route 288 in western Henrico County became a connector street, rather than a limited-access highway. It was named the John Rolfe Parkway.
