= Lewis Stukley =

Sir Lewis Stukley Vice-Admiral of Devonshire
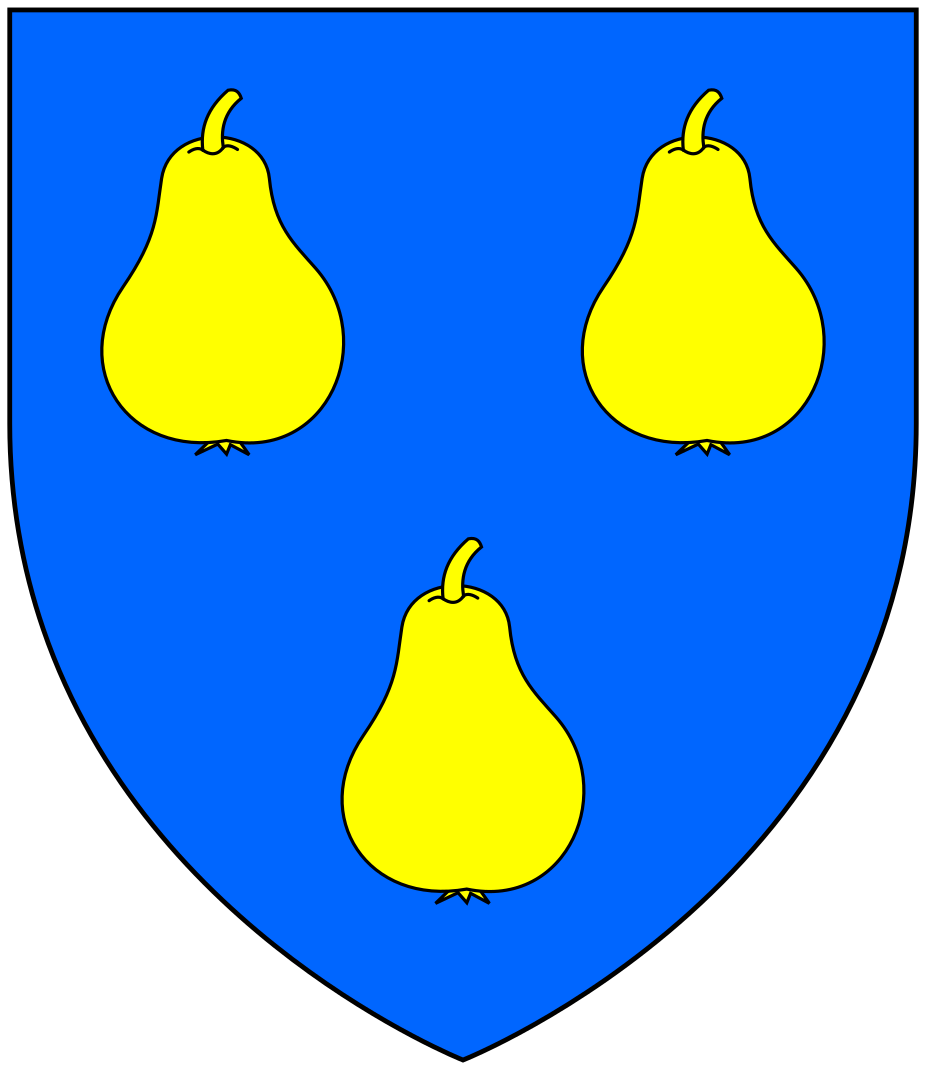
- Arms of Stucley of Affeton: Azure, three pears or. Motto: Bellement et Hardiment ("beautifully and bravely")
- Born: 1574; Devon, England
- Died: 1620 (aged 45–46); Lundy
- Resting place: South Molton
- Other names: "Sir Judas", Sir Lewis Stucley [sic], Stuckley, Stukeley
- Known for: Opponent of Sir Walter Raleigh; Guardian of Thomas Rolfe
- Spouse: Frances Monck (m. 1596)
- Awards: Knight Bachelor (1603)

Sir Lewis Stukley (b. 1574–d. 1620) lord of the manor of Affeton in Devon, was Vice-Admiral of Devonshire. He was guardian of Thomas Rolfe, and a main opponent of Walter Raleigh in his last days. Stucley's reputation is equivocal; popular opinion at the time idealised Raleigh, and to the public he was "Sir Judas" Stucley.

== Early life ==
He was the eldest son of John Stucley (1551–1611) lord of the manor of Affeton in Devon, and his wife Frances St Leger, daughter of Sir John St Leger, (d.1596) of Annery in Devon, His grandfather Lewis Stucley (c.1530–1581) of Affeton was the eldest brother of Thomas Stucley (1520–1578), a mercenary leader who was killed fighting against the Moors at the Battle of Alcazar.

He was knighted by King James I when on his way to London in 1603. In April 1617 he was appointed guardian of Thomas Rolfe, the two-year-old son of John Rolfe and "Rebecca" (Pocahontas). He later transferred Thomas's wardship to John's brother, Henry Rolfe in Heacham.

== Arrest of Sir Walter Raleigh ==
=== Reason ===
In 1618 Stucley had purchased the political office of Vice-Admiral of Devonshire. In June of the same year he left London with verbal orders from the James I to deal with Sir Walter Raleigh when he arrived at Plymouth on his return from the 1617 Orinoco expedition. A royal proclamation of 9 June had stated that the British Privateer had broken the peace treaty between England and Spain. This had caused intense diplomatic embarrassment for King James; Stucley may have understood the king's intention to be that Raleigh should flee the country, but in any case his approach was relaxed for a number of weeks.

=== Arrest ===
Stucley had a public notary board Raleigh's ship the Destiny in port. Then on the basis of a letter from the Lord High Admiral, Charles Howard, 1st Earl of Nottingham, dated 12 June, Stucley had the written authority to arrest Raleigh. He met Raleigh at Ashburton, and accompanied him back to Plymouth. While Stucley was waiting for further orders, Raleigh attempted to escape to France; but returned to his arrest. Stucley sold off the Destiny's cargo of tobacco.

=== Journey to London ===
Stucley had been told to make the journey easy for Raleigh, and show respect for his poor health. Setting off in earnest from the Plymouth area, from John Drake's house some way to the east and joining the Fosse Way near Musbury, on 25 July, Stucley's party escorted Raleigh. The events that followed were later much discussed. Raleigh traveled with his wife and son. One of Stucley's entourage was a French physician, Guillaume Manoury. They went via Sherborne, met Sir John Digby, and stayed with Edward Parham at Poyntington. They reached Salisbury on the 27th, haste now prompted by an official reproach.

At Salisbury the journey halted for a time. Manoury connived at a sickness Raleigh alleged, and Raleigh used the break in the journey to prepare some defense. The king was there, on a summer progress, and Raleigh used several devices to play for time, composing a state paper in justification of his expedition. At this point Stucley refused a bribe which Raleigh offered him. On 1 August they moved on.

By the time the party reached Andover, Stucley was aware that Raleigh intended to escape, and kept a better guard on him. He also countered Raleigh's attempts to corrupt him with duplicity, pretending to be swayed. In London on 7 August, Raleigh was for a short time a prisoner at large, lodging at his wife's house in Broad Street; he used the excuse of illness to argue for this lenient treatment, and was granted five days to regain his health. A chance contact in a Brentford inn with a French official gave him hope.

Raleigh attempted an escape down the River Thames, on 9 August; it was with the help of Stucley, who intended to betray him. The plot to ensnare Raleigh involved William Herbert, who had accompanied the Raleigh expedition, and others, as well as Stucley. Raleigh with a party including Stucley took a wherry at night from Towers Stairs; they got past Woolwich, but around Gallions Reach were overhauled by a larger wherry carrying Herbert. They returned to Greenwich and Stucley arrested Raleigh once more in the name of the king.

=== Tower of London ===
After the attempt, Raleigh was placed in the Tower of London. He was executed on 29 October, on the charge of high treason relating to the 1603 Main Plot; more recent testimony was not legally employed. On the scaffold Raleigh made his last speech, making a point of naming Stucley (to say he was forgiven).

== Demise ==
Stucley had given hostile, but not necessarily false, evidence against Raleigh. A public furore arose. It appeared that Stucley, wrongly said to be Raleigh's cousin, was appointed his warden not only as the vice-admiral of Devonshire, but as having an old grudge against Raleigh dating from 1584, when Raleigh deceived his father, John, then a volunteer in Sir Richard Grenville's Virginia voyage. It was alleged, and officially denied, that Stucley wished to let Raleigh escape in order to gain credit for rearresting him.

The Earl of Nottingham threatened to cudgel Stucley. The king said "On my soul, if I should hang all that speak ill of thee, all the trees in the country would not suffice".

=== Campaign ===
Raleigh had an effective posthumous advocate in Robert Tounson, who had attended his last days. While saying on the scaffold that he forgave everyone, having taken the sacrament for the last time, Raleigh still called Stucley perfidious. Stucley put together a defence of his own actions, for which Leonell Sharpe may have been the writer.

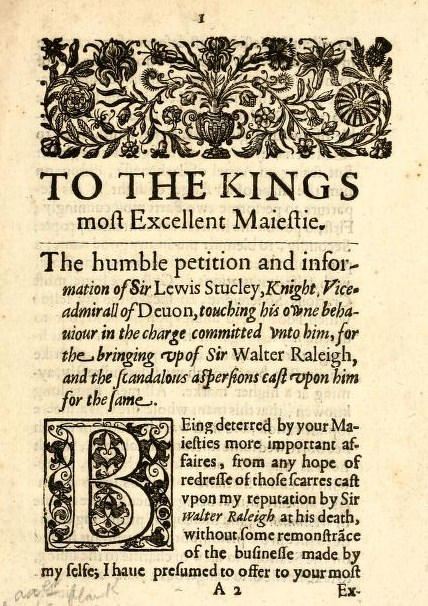
First page of Lewis Stucley's Petition (1618).

There were in fact two published documents in which Stucley put his side of the argument, an Apology, and the Petition of 26 November. There was also an official defence of the king's proceedings, the Declaration, written by Francis Bacon, possibly with Henry Yelverton and Robert Naunton. The Apology having failed, Stucley issued the Petition in effect asking for official backing; which was published in the Declaration of 27 November, the printers having been up all night.

John Chamberlain wrote to Sir Dudley Carleton at the end of 1618, reporting Stucley's reputation as a betrayer, and reporting the "Judas" epithet. In January 1619 Stucley and his son were charged with clipping coin, on slender evidence from a servant who had formerly been employed as a spy on Raleigh. The coins were £500 in gold, a payment for his expenses in dealing with Raleigh, and regarded as blood money as reported by Thomas Lorkyn writing to Sir Thomas Puckering in early 1619 (N.S.). It has been suggested by Baldwin Maxwell that the character of Septimius in The False One was a contemporary reference to Stucley; though this hypothesis has been regarded as unprovable.

Although James I pardoned him, popular hatred pursued him to Affeton so Stuckley fled to Lundy, an island in the Bristol Channel. It is said this is where he died in 1620, raving mad it was rumoured.

== Personal life ==
In 1596 he married Frances Monck (born 1571), eldest daughter of Anthony Monck who lived at Potheridge in Devon and aunt of George Monck, 1st Duke of Albemarle, having six sons and one daughter. From the point of view of Stucley's reputation at the time, it mattered whether Raleigh was part of his extended family, which was widely believed, but they were not related.
