= Richard Buck (chaplain) =

US colonial Virginia minister 1610–1624

The Reverend Richard Buck
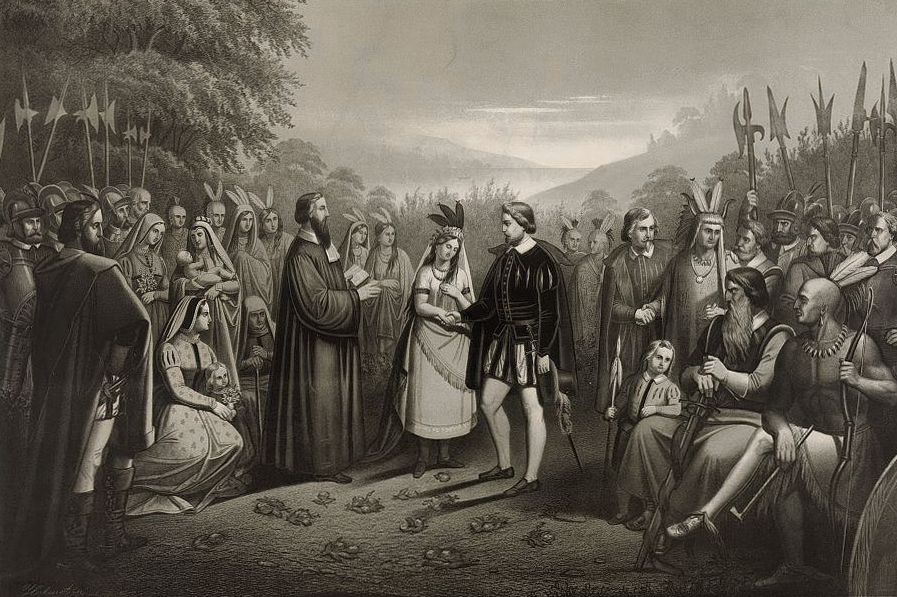
- Painting of the marriage of Pocahontas
- Born: 1582; Wymondham, Leicestershire, England
- Died: 1623 (age 41 or 42); Jamestown, Virginia, British America
- Other name: Richard Bucke
- Occupation: Minister
- Known for: Chaplain at first session of Virginia General Assembly
- Spouse(s): Maria Thorowgood; Elizabeth Browne

Reverend Richard Buck was a minister to the Colony of Virginia at Jamestown, Virginia from 1610 to 1624. He was chaplain of the first session of the Virginia General Assembly, which was composed of the House of Burgesses and the Virginia Governor's Council. This assembly met in the church at Jamestown on July 30, 1619, as the first elected assembly and law making body in colonial America.

== Early life ==
Richard Buck was born in 1582 in Wymondham, Leicestershire, England. Buck was a graduate of Oxford University.

== Recruitment and journey ==
Buck was recruited to serve as minister to the Colony of Virginia at Jamestown after the colony's first minister, Reverend Robert Hunt, died in 1608. Dr. Thomas Ravis, the Bishop of London, had recommended Buck for the appointment.

Buck, his wife and their two daughters sailed for Jamestown in 1609 with the colony's new governor, Sir Thomas Gates aboard the Sea Venture. The Sea Venture was wrecked in a storm off the coast of Bermuda and the passengers and crew did not arrive at Jamestown until May 23, 1610, nine months after the other ships of the Third Supply. While in Bermuda, Buck baptized the newborn daughter of John Rolfe and his first wife, Sarah Hacker. The child, named Bermuda, died afterwards. Sarah died before Rolfe arrived in Virginia.

== Arrival and resupply ==
When Gates and the other colonists from the Sea Venture arrived at Jamestown, they found only 60 of the previous 500 colonists still alive after the harsh winter of 1609–1610 which became known as the "Starving Time". Buck led the colonists in a "zealous and sorrowful prayer", which commemorated those who were deceased. Reverend Buck immediately gained the respect and affection of the colonists as his prayer reminded them of their esteemed first preacher, Robert Hunt. John Rolfe praised Buck as a "veerie good preacher".

In the following month, Thomas West, 3rd Baron De La Warr arrived at Jamestown with supplies and new colonists and assumed the office of governor on June 10, 1610. He was just in time to persuade the original settlers, who were nearly out of food and supplies and had boarded their ships to leave, not to return to England. West's first act was to kneel and say a silent prayer upon his arrival. Then he went to the chapel to hear a sermon from Reverend Buck.

== Life at Jamestown ==
Buck's duties included leading prayers twice a day and preaching on Thursday and Sunday. He officiated at religious and public events. Some sources state that Buck presided over the wedding of John Rolfe and Pocahontas on April 5, 1614. Others say that Alexander Whitaker, a vicar who settled at Henricus, presided at the wedding of Rolfe and Pocahontas.

The Virginia Company set aside 100 acres of land for glebe lands but the Buck family lived near the church in the Jamestown fort. In 1619, Buck acquired 750 acres of land in the "Neck-of-Land", which was separated from the north side of Jamestown Island by water. The location adjacent to Jamestown was an obvious area for expansion of the colony since it was close to the fort. Buck had indentured servants develop the land. These servants included caretaker Richard Kingsmill (sometimes spelled Kingsmell), who later became a large property owner. In 1620, William Fairfax sold 12 acres in Jamestown, including a home and an outbuilding, to Buck.

== First Virginia General Assembly ==
Reverend Buck opened the first session of the Virginia General Assembly, which convened in the church at Jamestown on July 30, 1619. He prayed "that it would please God to guide and sanctifie all our proceedings to his owne glory and the good of this Plantation."

== Death and family ==
He married Elizabeth Browne on 7 July 1607 in Norfolk, England. Elizabeth was the daughter of Sir George Browne and a granddaughter of Anthony Browne, 1st Viscount Montagu and Magdalen Dacre.

Buck died at Jamestown in 1624. According to historians Frank E. Gizzard and Dennis Boyd Smith, Buck's wife died within a few months of her husband.

He and Elizabeth had six children who survived to adulthood. They were Mara, Benoni, Gercian, Peleg, Elizabeth, who became the wife of Sergeant Thomas Crump (or Crampe), later a member of the House of Burgesses, and Bridget, who married John Burras, a brother of Anne Burras.
