= Donald W. Linebaugh =

American archaeologist and author

Donald W. Linebaugh is an American archaeologist and author.

Linebaugh, was director of the University of Kentucky Program for Archaeological Research in the College of Arts and Sciences and was assistant professor of anthropology. He began excavating the site of Colonel Robert Bolling's Kippax Plantation in 1981.

During his tenure at the College of William and Mary from 1988 to 1997, students and volunteers from the community assisted in the excavations at Kippax in present Hopewell, Virginia.

In 1997 Linebaugh joined the University of Kentucky's faculty.

Linebaugh located Robert Bolling's house in 2002 and excavated it with students from March 11 to March 16, 2002.

In 2004, Linebaugh was Director of the University of Maryland's Historic Preservation Program and Associate Professor in the School of Architecture, Planning, and Preservation.

He wrote The Man Who Found Thoreau: Roland W. Robbins and the Rise of Historical Archaeology in America, which documents the work of the controversial archaeologist Roland W. Robbins.
