= John Bolling =

American planter, politician and military officer (1676–1729)

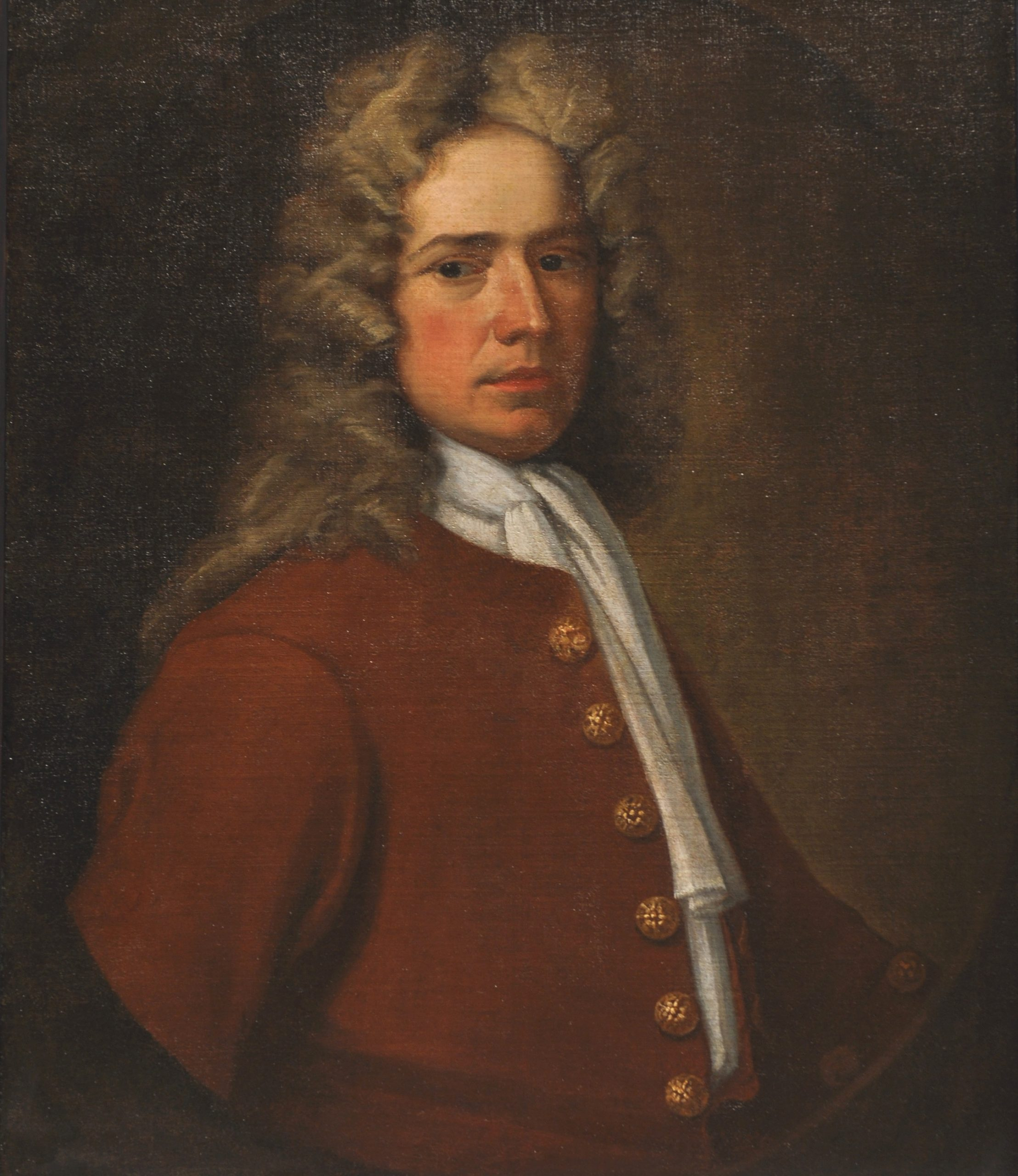

Burgess representing Henrico County
- In office 1723–1726
- Preceded by: Thomas Randolph
- Succeeded by: John Bolling Jr.
- In office 1718–1719 Serving with William Randolph
- Preceded by: Richard Cocke
- Succeeded by: Thomas Randolph
- In office 1710–1714 Serving with William Randolph, Francis Epes, Francis Epes Jr.
- Preceded by: Francis Epes
- Succeeded by: Richard Cocke

Personal details
- Born: January 27, 1676 Kippax plantation, Prince George County, Colony of Virginia
- Died: April 20, 1729 (aged 53) Cobbs Plantation, Henrico County, Colony of Virginia
- Resting place: Chesterfield County, Virginia
- Spouse: Mary Kennon (m. 1697; died 1727)
- Children: John Bolling Jr. Jane Bolling; Elizabeth Bolling; Mary Bolling; Martha Bolling; Anne Bolling
- Parents: Robert Bolling (father); Jane Rolfe (mother)
- Relatives: Thomas Rolfe (maternal grandfather); Pocahontas (maternal great-grandmother)

John Bolling (January 27, 1676 – April 20, 1729) was an American merchant, planter, politician and military officer in the colony of Virginia, who served several terms in the House of Burgesses, all representing Henrico County. The earliest of four related men of the same name to serve in the Virginia General Assembly, he was the great-grandson of Pocahontas and her husband, John Rolfe. He is often confused with his firstborn son of the same name (who also held the same militia rank of major), John Bolling (1700-1757) who at various times because of the creation of new counties and his own establishment of "Bolling Hall" plantation in Goochland County, represented Goochland, Henrico and Chesterfield counties.

== Early life ==
Bolling's coat of arms

John Bolling was born at Kippax Plantation, which his father had established in Charles City County, in the east central part of Virginia, a site which is now within the corporate limits of the City of Hopewell. John Bolling was the son of Jane Rolfe (who died shortly after birth) and her husband, English-born merchant and later burgess Colonel Robert Bolling (1646-1709). Thus, he was the only great-grandchild of Pocahontas and her husband, John Rolfe. After this boy's mother died in 1709, his father remarried, to Ann Stith, who bore several additional children, including his half brother who also served in the House of Burgesses.

== Merchant and planter ==
Like his father, John Bolling was a merchant, later writing that he "devoted himself to commerce" and "received all the profits of an immense trade with his countrymen, and of one still greater with the Indians." In November 1704, this man bought "Cobbs" plantation just west of Point of Rocks on the north shore of the Appomattox River downstream from present-day Petersburg, Virginia. (Cobbs was located in Henrico County until the area south of the James River was subdivided to form Chesterfield County in 1749.) In 1722, Bolling opened a tobacco warehouse in what is now the 'Pocahontas' neighborhood of Petersburg.

Bolling had many conferences with William Byrd II, a powerful merchant, politician and planter associated with Westover Plantation. Byrd made Bolling his supply agent for an expedition to survey the colony's southern boundary, which expedition occurred the year before Bolling's death.

Bolling inherited about 5,000 acres from his father, and acquired much more land in what became several different counties in his lifetime and more later. He operated those plantations at least in part using enslaved labor, and owned many slaves when he died. His last will and testament bequeathed Cobbs plantation and 600 acres to his widow, as well as 1,200 acres to each of their two daughters, with his son and primary heir receiving 15,000 acres.

== Public life ==
Bolling probably was a vestryman of Dale Parish, and served as an officer in the county militia, receiving promotions from captain to major.

Henrico voters elected John Bolling as one of their representatives in the Virginia House of Burgesses for most (but not all) of the sessions between 1710 until succeeded by his son in 1726.

== Personal life ==
John Bolling married Mary Kennon (–1727), daughter of Richard Kennon and Elizabeth Worsham, on December 29, 1697. They had six children, whose names appear in John Bolling's will:

- John Bolling Jr. (1700–1757) married Elizabeth Lewis in 1720. Later he married Elizabeth Blair (daughter of Archibald Blair and the niece of James Blair, the first president of the College of William & Mary; her second husband was Richard Bland) on August 1, 1728. He had at least nine children, including John Bolling III, who married Mary Jefferson (the sister of United States President Thomas Jefferson). His great-great-granddaughter was Edith Bolling, the future First Lady for her husband, Woodrow Wilson.
- Jane Bolling (1703–1766) married Colonel Richard Randolph in 1724 and had seven children.
- Elizabeth Bolling (b. 1709), married William Gay of Scotland and had three children.
- Mary Bolling (1711–1744), married John Fleming and had eight children.
- Martha Bolling (1713–1737), married Thomas Eldridge in 1729 and had four children.
- Anne Bolling (1718–1800), married James Murray and had six children.

== Death and legacy ==
Bolling died at Cobbs plantation on April 20, 1729, according to various historians either still a burgess, or three years after his firstborn son began serving in the House of Burgesses. In either event, he was buried at Cobbs plantation. In addition to the land bequests described above, Bolling also left cash gifts totaling more than 700 pounds.
