= Robert Bolling =

English-born merchant and planter (1646–1709)

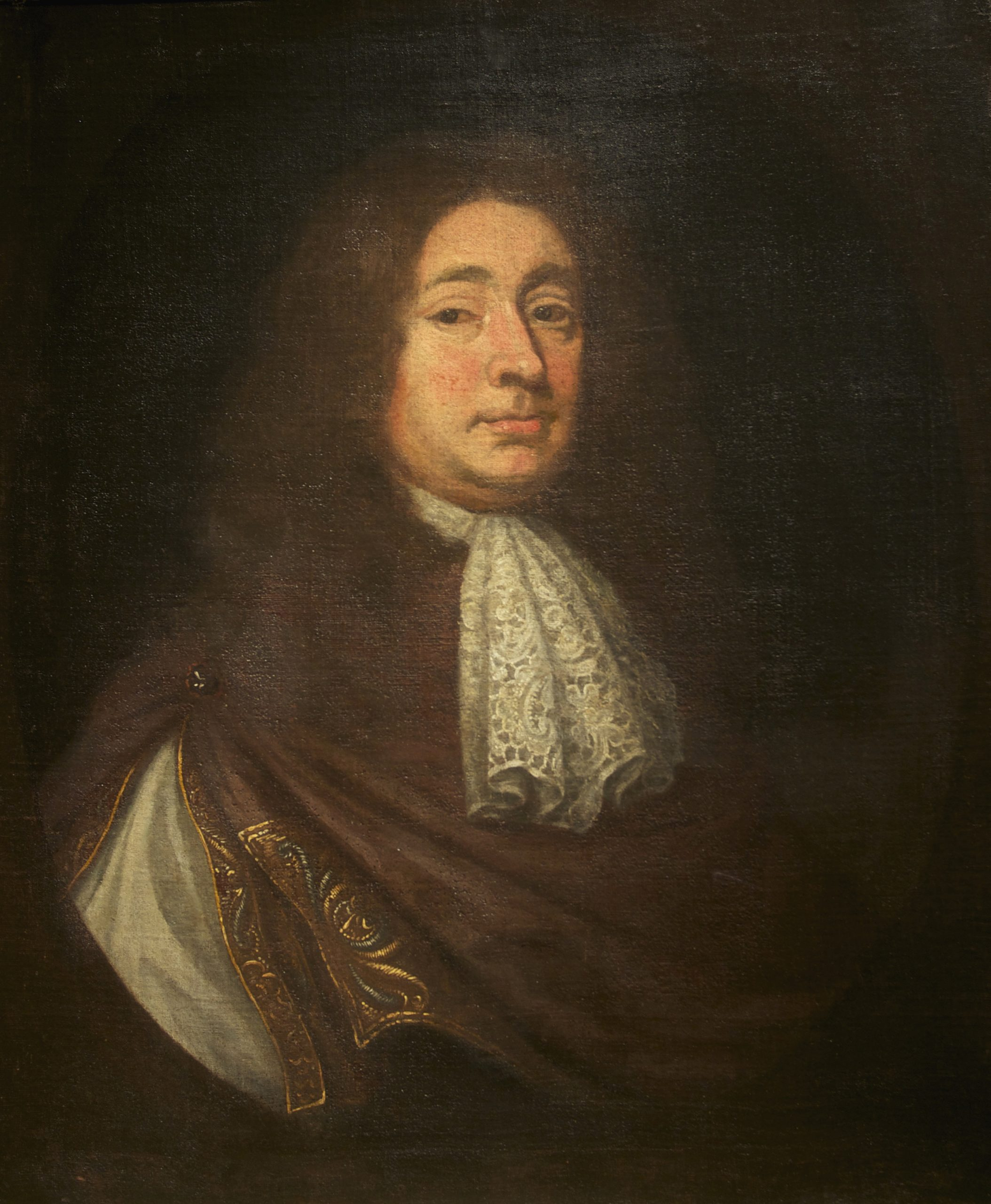
- Portrait, c. 1685–1700

Burgess representing Prince George County
- In office 1703–1706
- Preceded by: position created
- Succeeded by: Robert Bolling Jr.

Burgess representing Charles City County
- In office 1699–1699 Serving with John Taylor
- Preceded by: Charles Goodrich
- Succeeded by: Richard Bland
- In office 1688–1692 Serving with Peter Perry, Henry Batt
- Preceded by: Edward Hill Jr.
- Succeeded by: John Stith

Personal details
- Born: December 26, 1646 London, England
- Died: July 17, 1709 (aged 62) Kippax Plantation, Prince George County, Virginia
- Resting place: Blandford Cemetery
- Spouse(s): Jane Rolfe (1674–1676); Anne Stith (1681–1709)
- Children: 8, including John Bolling
- Relatives: Robert Bolling (grandson)

Robert Bolling (December 26, 1646 – July 17, 1709) was an English-born merchant, planter and politician. He was the founder of the Bolling family of Virginia, one of the First Families of Virginia, with at least fifteen descendants (including two of his sons) serving in the Virginia General Assembly as well as holding local offices, as did he.

== Early life ==
Bolling's coat of arms

Robert Bolling was born at Tower Street, All Hallows, Barking Parish, in London on December 26, 1646, the son of John Bolling (b. 1615) and Mary Carie (née Clarke) Bolling. He was named after his grandfather Robert Bolling; his grandmother was Anne Clarke. His father John, was one of the Bollings of Bolling Hall, near Bradford, England. Robert's ancestry could be traced to Robert Bolling, Esquire, who died in 1485 and was buried in the family vault in the church of Bradford.

== Career ==
On October 2, 1660, at the age of fourteen, Bolling arrived in the colony of Virginia.

As a successful merchant, possibly originally sponsored by Thomas Batte, Bolling was a part owner of a ship by the 1670s. Bolling used headrights from importing indentured servants or enslaved people to acquire land. His first surviving land patent dates from January 1675, and Bolling eventually owned more than 5000 acres on the south side of the Appomattox River. Bolling was identified as a "gentleman" when he and William Randolph patented 623 acres of Warwick Swamp in 1682 for transporting 13 named people, but lacked that honorific in 1686 when he and Daniell Monaley acquired 347 acres for transporting 7 unnamed persons. In 1690 the General Court allowed Bolling to re-patent land previously granted to other men who failed to develop it as required, and named eight people that Bolling had transported, all identified by two names except for "Tony a negro". Bolling was again named as a "Gent." in 1697 when allowed to re-patent a deserted patent of 300 or 460 acres for transporting six people named only by their first names. In 1701 the General Court allowed Bolling to re-patent 300 acres for transporting six people, each identified with two names.

Bolling built his house near the Appomattox River on Kippax Plantation, which was in the part of Charles City County that became Prince George County in 1702. Bolling served as Charles County's sheriff from 1692-1694 and again from 1699 until 1700. He rose to the rank of lieutenant colonel in the Virginia militia by 1704.

A decade after Bacon's Rebellion, Bolling began his public life by becoming a justice of the peace for Charles City County in June, and by year's end successfully contested the election of Edward Hill Jr. as one of the burgesses representing Prince George County. He won re-election once, but then was not returned to office until 1699 (after different men were elected on five occasions, possibly because those responsibilities conflicted with those of Bolling's sheriff office or because of his travels) and was not re-elected. After creation of Prince George County in 1702, Bolling became one of the first two burgesses representing the new county and won re-election, until succeeded by his son of the same name.

== Personal life ==
Bolling married twice. In 1674, Bolling married Jane Rolfe, daughter of Thomas Rolfe, the son of Pocahontas. They had one son, John Bolling (January 27, 1676/7 – April 20, 1729). Jane Rolfe Bolling is believed to have died in childbirth, but this was also the year of Bacon's Rebellion. The firstborn son John Bolling survived and became a wealthy planter and legislator (as did his half-brother mentioned below), as well as married Mary Kennon, daughter of Richard Kennon and Elizabeth Worsham, who bore six children.

In 1681, after his first wife died, Col. Bolling married his second wife Anne Stith, daughter of John Drury and Jane (Gregory) Stith. They had five sons and two daughters together:

- Robert Bolling Jr. (January 25, 1682–1749), succeeded his father as burgess, and also served as the Clerk of the Prince George County Court by 1710. On January 27, 1706 he married Anne Mary Cocke, daughter of Richard Cocke and wife Elizabeth and paternal granddaughter of Richard Cocke and wife Mary Aston. His grandson Beverley Randolph, became eighth governor of Virginia. Robert and Anne were also the great-grandparents of Anne Custis – wife of CSA General Robert Edward Lee.
- Stith Bolling (1686–1727), married Elizabeth Hartwell and had sons named Robert, John, Stith and Alexander (who like his uncle but unlike his father, continued the family tradition of legislative service).
- Captain Edward Bolling (1687–1710), married Ms. Slaughter and died of smallpox at sea.
- Anne Bolling (1690–1750), married Robert Elam, Senior.
- Drury Bolling (1695–1726), married Elizabeth Meriwether. (Elizabeth's brother Nicholas Meriwether was a great-great-grandfather of Captain Meriwether Lewis the explorer.)
- Thomas Bolling (1697–1734).
- Agnes Bolling (1700–1762), married Richard Kennon.

The descendants of Robert Bolling's first marriage are sometimes referred to in family history forums as "Red Bollings" due to the Native American lineage of Jane Rolfe's grandmother Pocahontas. These "Red Bollings" include prominent descendants such as Edith Bolling Wilson, wife of U.S. President Woodrow Wilson. Bolling's great-grandson, Robert Bolling, was one of the most prolific poets in colonial Virginia, as well as served in the House of Burgesses. Yet another Robert Bolling published a genealogical history of his family in 1868. The descendants of this man's second marriage are sometimes referred to as "White Bollings".

== Death and legacy ==
Robert Bolling suffered dropsy during his final months and died on July 17, 1709. He was buried on his Kippax Plantation, in Prince George County, where his tomb still stands. Both his sons John Bolling (who lived at Cobbs plantation on the Appomattox River in what eventually became Chesterfield County) and Robert Bolling Jr. continued the family traditions, becoming planters and serving as burgesses for their respective counties (as well as becoming the executors of this man's estate). In 1858, this man's remains were removed from Kippax to the Bolling mausoleum at Blandford Cemetery in Petersburg, Virginia erected by his great-grandson. However, the county's first will book, which would contain this man's last will and testament, remained lost as of 1992. The second will book (which began in 1710 under the clerkship of his son Robert Bolling Jr. and had been removed during the Civil War), was returned in the mid-20th century by a lady in Cincinnati, Ohio in consultation with a lawyer.

Archaeologist Donald W. Linebaugh, of the University of Kentucky, located the remains of Col. Bolling's house in Hopewell, Virginia in 2002.

== Sources ==
- American Presidential Families, Hugh Brogan and Charles Mosley, Macmillan Publishing Company, New York, 1993.
- Pocahontas, alias Matoaka, and her descendants : at Jamestown, Virginia, in April, 1614, with John Rolfe, gentleman : including the names of Alfriend, Archer, Bentley, Bernard, Bland, Bolling, Branch, Cabell, Catlett, Cary, Dandridge, Dixon, Douglas, Duval, Eldridge, Ellett, Ferguson, Field, Fleming, Gay, Gordon, Griffin, Grayson, Harrison, Hubard, Lewis, Logan, Markham, Meade, McRae, Murray, Page, Poythress, Randolph, Robertson, Skipwith, Stanard, Tazewell, Walke, West, Whittle, and others : with biographical sketches, Wyndham Robertson, J. W. Randolph & English, 1887.
