= Robert Bolling (poet) =

American planter, poet and politician (1738–1775)

Burgess representing Buckingham County, Colony of Virginia
- In office 1761–1765 Serving with Joseph Cabell
- Preceded by: position created
- Succeeded by: Samuel Jordan

Personal details
- Born: August 17, 1738 Varina plantation, Henrico County, Colony of Virginia
- Died: July 21, 1775 (aged 36) Richmond, Virginia
- Spouse(s): Mary Burton; Susanna Watson
- Children: 2 sons, 2 daughters

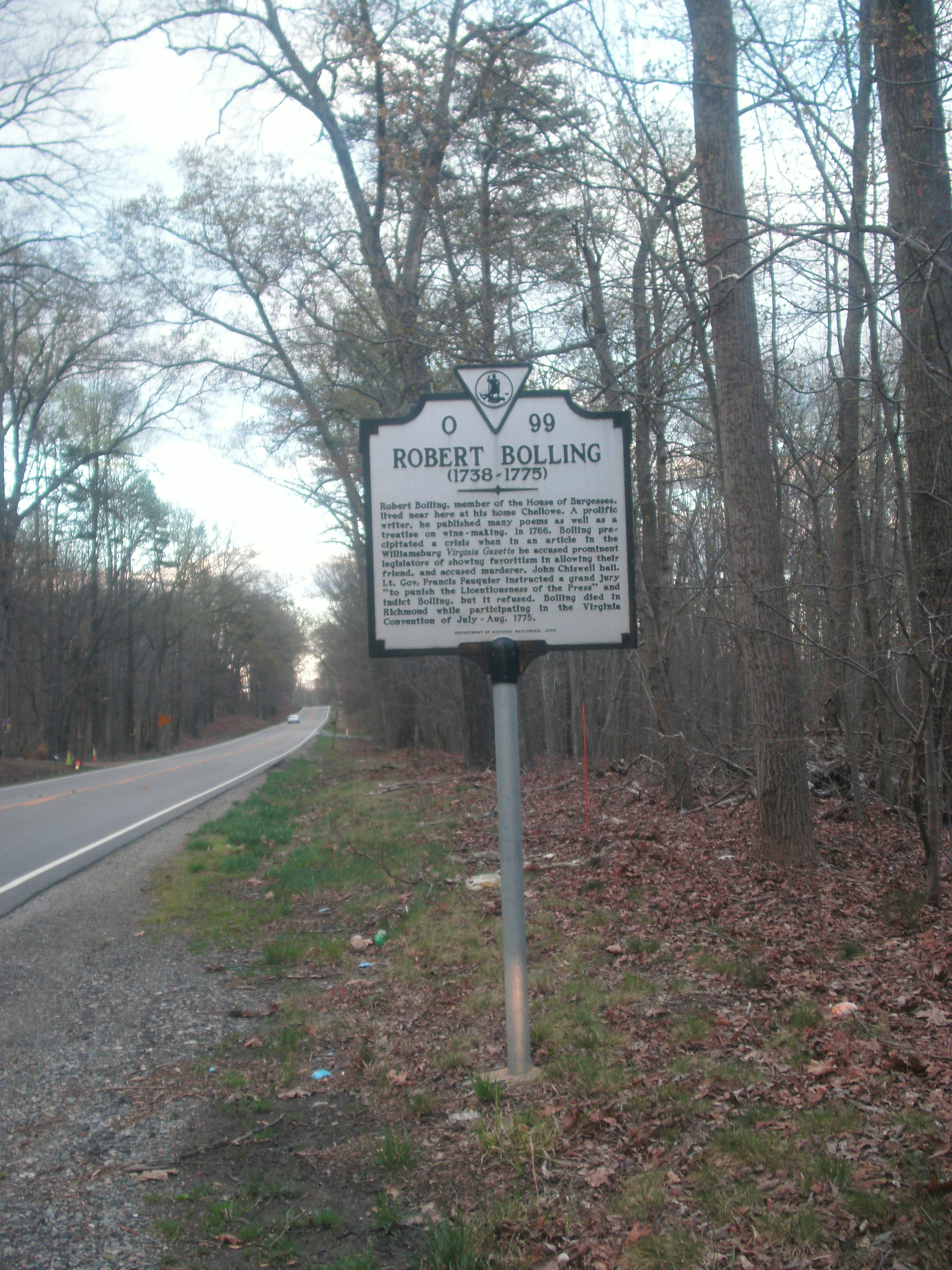
A marker dedicated to Bolling

Robert Bolling (August 17, 1738 – July 21, 1775) was an American planter, poet and politician.

== Early life and education ==
Born to the former Elizabeth Blair (daughter of Archibald Blair) and her husband John Bolling (1700-1757) at Varina plantation in Henrico County, Virginia. His father at various times served as burgess for Goochland County, Hnerico County and Chesterfield County. His elder half brother John represented Goochland county and later Chesterfield County. In 1751, his father sent the 13-year old across the Atlantic Ocean for his education at the Free Grammar School of Queen Elizabeth in Wakefield, England. Beginning in 1755 young Bolling studied law at the Middle Temple. However, he returned to Virginia to complete his legal studies under Benjamin Waller at the colony's capital in Williamsburg. He had at least two brothers, Edward Bolling (who died in 1770) and Archibald Bolling (who later sued him over Edward's estate). Complicating matters, he had several contemporary relatives of the same name, including one who represented Dinwiddie County in the House of Burgesses beginning in 1756 and again beginning in 1765, and another who married the widow of John Bland in 1779.

== Personal life ==
For most of 1760, Bolling courted Anne Miller, a distant cousin, but she sailed to Scotland with her father and later married Sir Peyton Skipwith. In 1763, Bolling married Mary Burton of Northampton County (1749-1764), but she died two days after giving birth to their daughter. He then in 1765 married Susanna Watson of Amherst County, who bore two sons and two daughters.

== Career ==
Upon his father's death in 1757, Bolling inherited his father's Cobbs plantation in Chesterfield County and lived there while building a house he called Chellowe, further west in the part of Albemarle County that became Buckingham County, Virginia in 1761. Both were tobacco plantation operated with slave labor.

Bolling was known for his language skills, and also received an award of 50 pounds sterling a year from the House of Burgesses in 1773, perhaps based on an essay about wine making which was published in Purdie and Dixon's Williamsburg Virginia Gazette on February 25, 1773. Though Bolling published at least 35 poems in British periodicals during his lifetime, more poetry than any other American colonist at the time, most of his works remained in manuscript, and remain unpublished to this day. Williamsburg newspapers published much of his poetry, including one acknowledging the arrival of Lord Botetourt to become the colony's governor in 1768, and another on the deaths of Virginia militiamen at the Battle of Point Pleasant in 1775. Bolling wrote poetry in Italian, French and Latin as well as English. A later Robert Bolling (descendant of his brother) also translated and published in a family history entitled A Memoir of a Portion of the Bolling Family in England and Virginia; it was originally written in French.

Bolling was one of newly created Buckingham County's first two representatives in the House of Burgesses, and by 1774 was the second most senior member of the Buckingham County Court (having served since its creation in 1761). Over his objections, Buckingham voters elected him as the county sheriff in 1765. That may have precluded him from further legislative service, or he may have been defeated for re-election. Bolling had physically left the House of Burgesses before the last 1765 session (famous for Patrick Henry's presentation of the Virginia Resolves against the Stamp Act) in order to travel to Amherst County to marry. Bolling also was involved in controversies, such as satirizing the preaching of Rev. George Whitefield in April 1765 and questioning the General Court's favoritism toward John Chiswell (who was on trial for murder), which led to a libel lawsuit against him by William Byrd (1728-1777) after a grand jury refused to indict Bolling, and both men were jailed after they had agreed to a dual (which was illegal).

Bolling led the county's militia with the rank of colonel by 1773.

== Death and legacy ==
When Virginia's governor Lord Dunmore suspended the legislature, Bolling became one of the county's delegates to the Third Virginia Convention held in July–August 1775. Although he was present when the convention convened, he died suddenly four days later, possibly of a heart attack, in Richmond, Virginia. In 1787, his estate was still in existence, with William Newton as overseer, although not tithable, and owned eight enslaved adults and eleven enslaved children, as well as five horses and 25 cattle. His papers are now owned by the University of Virginia and the Huntington Library.

The cantata Virginiana was published by composer Gregory Spears in 2015, based on texts written by Bolling during his failed courtship of his cousin, Anne Miller, in 1760.
