= Thomas Rolfe =

Son of Pocahontas and John Rolfe (1615–1680)

Lieutenant Thomas Rolfe
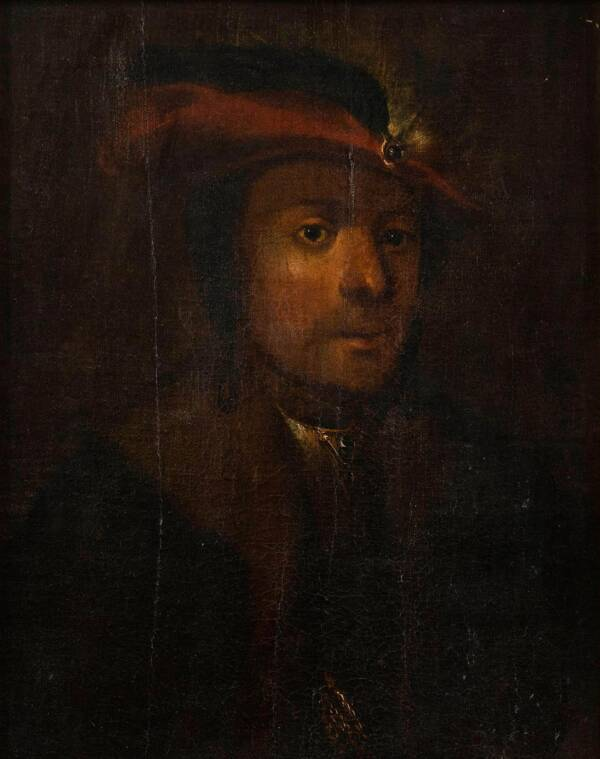
- Portrait of a young man, possibly Thomas Rolfe
- Born: January 30, 1615; James Cittie, Colony of Virginia, English America
- Died: c. 1680 (aged 64–65)
- Other names: "Thomas Wrolfe", Lt. Rolfe
- Spouse: Jane Poythress
- Children: Jane Rolfe
- Parent(s): John Rolfe; Pocahontas
- Relatives: Wahunsenacawh (grandfather)

Thomas Rolfe (January 30, 1615 – c. 1680) was the only child of Pocahontas and her English husband, John Rolfe. His maternal grandfather was Chief Powhatan, the leader of the Powhatan Confederacy in Virginia.

== Early life ==
Thomas Rolfe was born in the English colony of Virginia to John Rolfe and his wife, Pocahontas (Matoaka), in January 1615. It is believed he was born at the Rolfe family plantation, Varina, in what was then the corporation of James Cittie. Rolfe's birth was recorded as the first time a child was born to a Native American woman and a European man in the history of Virginia. In 1616 John Rolfe and Pocahontas accompanied Governor Sir Thomas Dale on a trip to England to promote the Colony of Virginia, they sailed aboard the Treasurer captained by Samuel Argall, arriving at Plymouth, England on 12 June 1616. Less than two years of age, Thomas Rolfe accompanied his parents on this voyage.

In March 1617, the Rolfe family had boarded ship, preparing to set sail back to Virginia, when Pocahontas was taken seriously ill and died. They disembarked at Gravesend in Kent, where Pocahontas was buried. Thomas was sick as well, and fearing he would not survive the sea journey home, John Rolfe appointed Sir Lewis Stukley as his guardian on 21 March 1617. Grieving for his wife and worried for the life of his son, John Rolfe was persuaded by Admiral Argall and other members of the party to continue the voyage. Father and son would never see each other again. John Rolfe, Tomocomo, the governor and other surviving Native Americans returned to Virginia. Stuckley later transferred custody and care of Thomas Rolfe to his uncle, Henry Rolfe.

After returning to Virginia, John Rolfe married a third time, to Jane Pierce, and gave Thomas a younger half-sister, Elizabeth.

John Rolfe wrote his will on March 10, 1622 and died not long after that. In his will John appointed his father in law, William Peirce, as executor of his estate and guardian of his 2 children, Thomas and Elizabeth.

In October 1622, Henry Rolfe petitioned the Council of Virginia, claiming entitlement to a portion of John Rolfe's land for maintenance of Thomas Rolfe. Thomas remained in his uncle's care until he reached roughly 21 years of age. Sometime before June 1635 Thomas returned to Virginia, his transportation paid for by his Virginia guardian and stepgrandfather, William Pierce. This is known with certainty because Pierce patented land on June 22, 1635, claiming headright for the transportation of 40 individuals, including Thomas Rolfe. There is no further mention of his whereabouts or doings until 1641.

Once established in Virginia again, Thomas Rolfe fostered both his reputation as a plantation owner and member of his mother's lineage.

== Family ==
As Rolfe was a child of a white settler and a Native American woman, some aspects of his life were particularly controversial. He expressed interest in rekindling relations with his Native American relatives, despite societal ridicule and colonial laws that forbade such contact. In 1641, Rolfe petitioned the governor for permission to visit his "aunt and his kinsman Opechancanough".

Rolfe married Jane Poythress, the daughter of Captain Francis Poythress, a prosperous landowner in Virginia. Their daughter, Jane Rolfe, was born at Varina Plantation, Charles City County, Virginia, on October 10, 1650. There is no record of any other children, and no record of any other marriages for Thomas Rolfe.

== Land ==
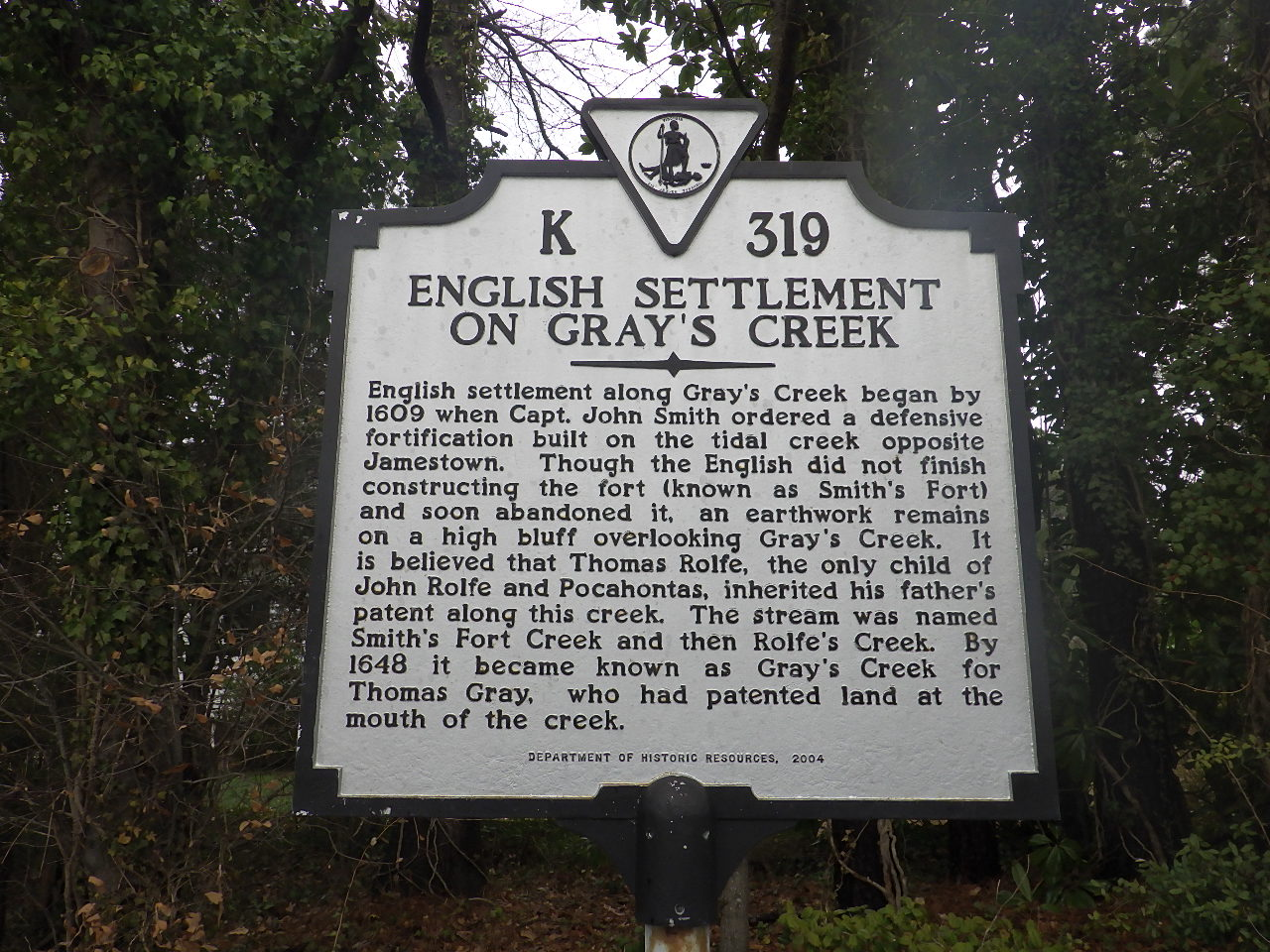
English Settlement on Gray's Creek historical marker

According to his father's will, both Thomas and Elizabeth, his half-sister, received named land. There is no extant proof that some land came from the Native Americans. However Native Americans did not have the same concept of land ownership as the white settlers. There is no mention of former Native American land in John Rolfe's will; however, John Rolfe names Thomas as the rightful heir of all his land, profits and any royalties pertaining to such land. There were rumors in 1618 that when Thomas came of age, he would inherit a sizable portion of Powhatan territory; this information was transmitted through Argall to London, stating, "'Opechanano and the Natives have given their Country to Rolfe's Child and that they will reserve it from all others till he comes of yeares...." (Mossiker). There is no extant documentation that when Thomas arrived in Virginia in 1640, the land was recorded as "Varina," his patrimonial property sixteen miles below Richmond.

Thomas's step-grandfather, named Captain William Peirce, received a grant of 2000 acres of land on June 22, 1635, for the "transportation of 40 persons among whom was Thomas Rolfe". He then listed Thomas as heir to his father's land. Prior to March 1640, Thomas took possession of this land which was located on the lower side of the James River.

Thomas also inherited a tract of some 150 acres on June 10, 1654, in Surry County, across from Jamestown; the land was described in a later deed as "Smith's Fort old field and the Devil's Woodyard swamp being due unto the said Rolfe by Gift from the Indian King".

The year after the 1644 Native American attack on the colony, four forts were established to defend the frontier: Fort Henry, Fort Royal, Fort James, and Fort Charles. Fort James was to be under the command of Thomas Rolfe as lieutenant as of October 5, 1646. He was given six men, and was instructed to fight against the Native Americans—his own people;

And it is further enacted and granted, That left.[Lieutenant] Thomas Rolfe shall have and enjoy for himselfe and his heires for ever fort James alias Chickahominy fort with fowre hundred acres of land adjoyning to the same, with all houses and edifices belonging to the said forte and all boats and ammunition at present belonging to the said fort; Provided that he the said Leift. Rolfe doe keepe and maintaine sixe men vpon the place duringe the terme and time of three yeares, for which tyme he the said Leift. Rolfe for himselfe and the said sixe men are exempted from publique taxes.

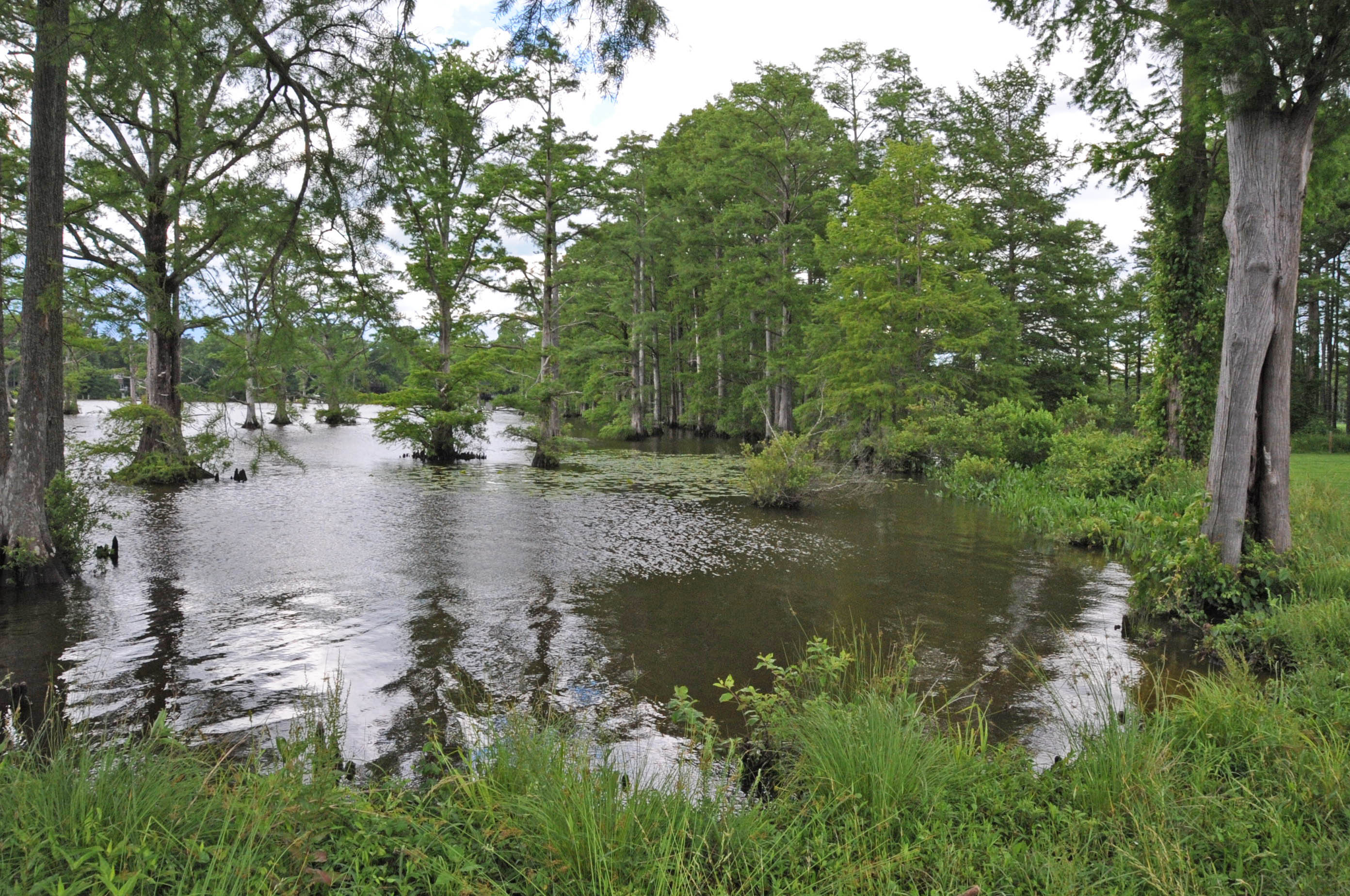
Site of the fort on Diascund Creek

Then, on October 6, 1646, Thomas was put in charge of building a fort at Moysonec, for which he received 400 acres (160 ha) of land. This fort was located on the west side of Diascund Creek.

Several years later, Rolfe patented 525 acres on August 8, 1653, "...lying upon the North side of Chickahominy river commonly called and known by the name of James fort...", apparently including the 400 acres he had received in 1646. This James Fort land was re patented by William Browne on April 23, 1681. The tract was described in the patent as "formerly belonging to Mr Thomas Rolfe, dec'd", thus establishing that Rolfe had died before that date.

== Death ==
The last recorded mention of Thomas Rolfe exists in a land patent from September 16, 1658. While some sources claim that Thomas died in 1680, others claim that the exact year is unknown. Some evidence purports that Thomas Rolfe died in James City County, Virginia; however the records of the county were destroyed in 1685 during a fire.

== Legacy ==
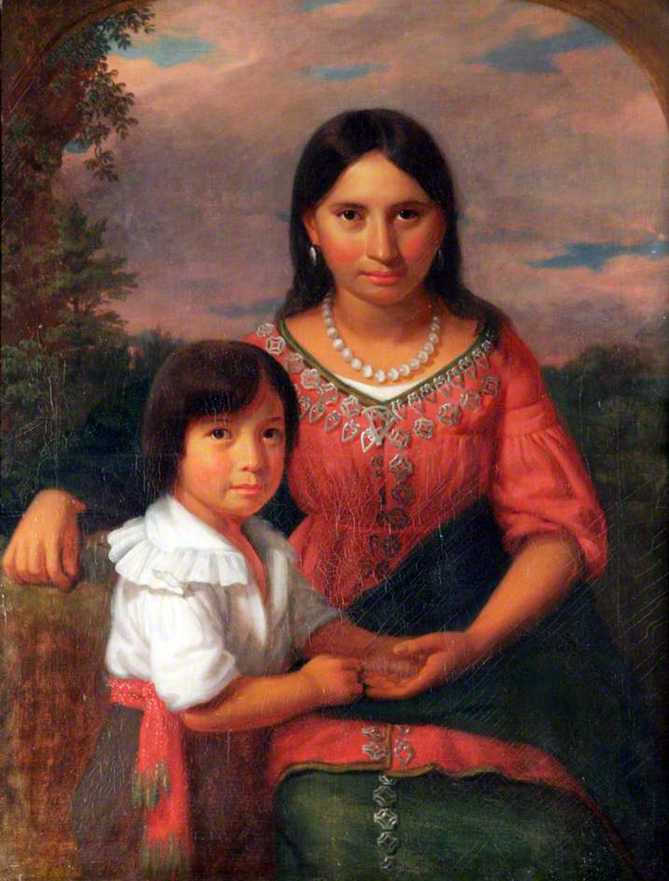
The Sedgeford Hall Portrait, once believed to represent Pocahontas (also known as Matoaka) and her son, has been re-identified as being Pe-o-ka (wife of Osceola) and their son.

Rolfe's daughter, Jane Rolfe, married Robert Bolling of Prince George County, Virginia; the couple's son, John Bolling, was born on January 27, 1676. Jane Rolfe is said to have died shortly after giving birth. John Bolling married Mary Kennon, daughter of Richard Kennon and Elizabeth Worsham of Conjurer's Neck. John and Mary Bolling had six surviving children, each of whom married and had surviving children.

The Sedgeford Hall Portrait, now in King's Lynn Town Hall, once believed to represent Pocahontas and her son Thomas Rolfe, has been re-identified as being Pe-o-ka, wife of the Seminole leader Osceola, and their son.

The birth of Thomas Rolfe, as he was both of European and Native American descent, reinstated peace between the Powhatans and the European settlements. Early in his career as deputy governor, Argall reported in a letter published within the Virginia Company Records that Powhatan "goes from place to place visiting his country taking his pleasure in good friendship with us laments his daughter's death but glad her child is living so doth Opachank".

More than an estimated 100,000 people today might descend from Thomas Rolfe. Notable descendants include Edith Bolling Galt Wilson, wife of Woodrow Wilson, and actor Edward Norton.
