= Albemarle Settlements =

Former English settlements in North America

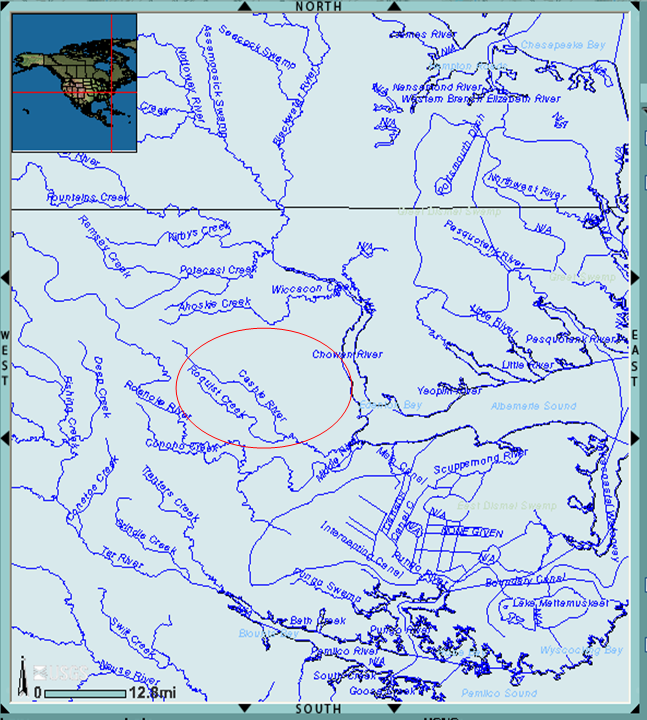
Albemarle Settlement Region

The Albemarle Settlements were the first permanent English settlements in what is now North Carolina, founded in the Albemarle Sound and Roanoke River regions, beginning about the middle of the 17th century. The settlers were mainly Virginians, migrating south.

== History ==
In 1653, the Virginia Assembly granted one Roger Green and 100 residents of Nansemond County 10,000 acres on the Roanoke River west of the Chowan River. In 1662, George Durant purchased lands from the Native Americans in this region and there is evidence to indicate that others had done the same.

When it was learned that the Albemarle settlements were not included in the Carolina proprietary grant of 1663, a new charter was granted in 1665 which included them. A government was instituted in the region of Albemarle Sound in 1664; and within a decade, settlements extended from the Chowan River to Currituck Sound, known as Albemarle County.

During Bacon's Rebellion in 1676, Albemarle Settlements offered assistance and refuge to the rebels. The rebellion's strongholds were mostly south of the James River, a region linked to the Albemarle Settlements by roads and rivers. A road linked "southside Virginia" to Edenton, Carolina, skirting the edge of the Great Dismal Swamp. The Blackwater River of southside Virginia flowed south to the Chowan River, providing another link.

The boundary between Virginia and North Carolina was uncertain until a 1728 survey was done under William Byrd II, described in his book The History of the Dividing Line. Until then, many settlers did not know whether their lands were in Virginia or North Carolina.

The Albemarle Settlements came to be known in Virginia as "Rogues' Harbor".
