= Charles Willing Byrd =

American judge (1770–1828)

Judge of the United States District Court for the District of Ohio
- In office March 3, 1803 – August 25, 1828
- Appointed by: Thomas Jefferson
- Preceded by: Seat established by 2 Stat. 201
- Succeeded by: William Creighton Jr.

Acting Governor of the Northwest Territory
- In office November 22, 1802 – March 1, 1803
- Preceded by: Arthur St. Clair
- Succeeded by: Office abolished

Secretary of the Northwest Territory
- In office January 1, 1800 – March 1, 1803
- Appointed by: John Adams
- Preceded by: William Henry Harrison
- Succeeded by: Office abolished

Personal details
- Born: Charles Willing Byrd; July 26, 1770 Westover Plantation, Colony of Virginia, British America
- Died: August 25, 1828 (aged 58) Sinking Spring, Ohio, U.S.
- Resting place: Sinking Spring, Ohio, U.S.
- Spouse: Hannah Miles Byrd
- Children: Jane Byrd Long, Samuel Otway Byrd
- Parent(s): William Byrd III; Mary Willing Byrd
- Relatives: William Byrd II (grandfather)
- Education: Read law
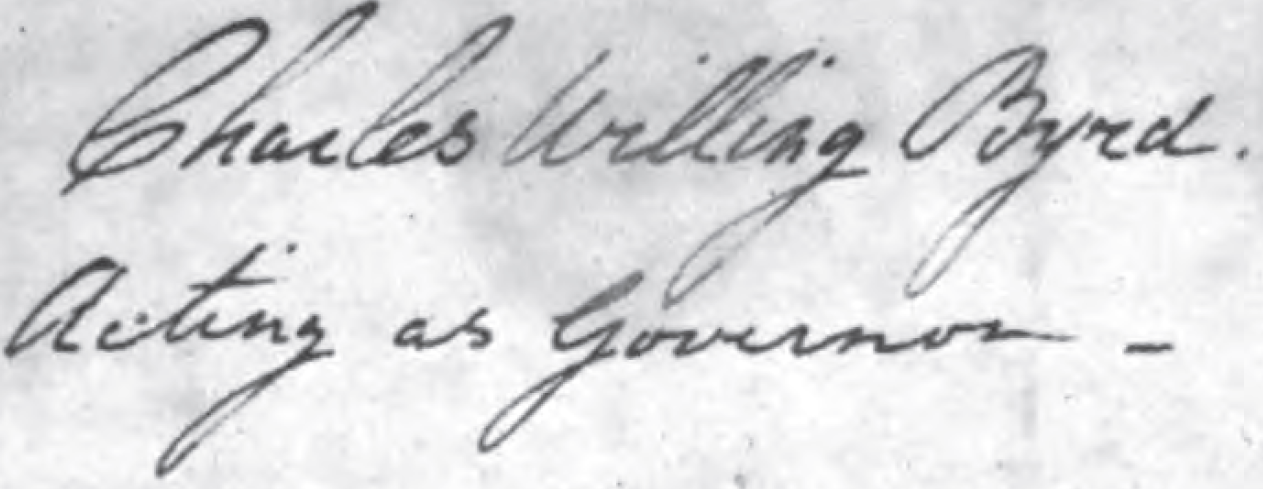
- Signature

Charles Willing Byrd (July 26, 1770 – August 25, 1828) was an American politician who was the Secretary of the Northwest Territory, acting Governor of the Northwest Territory and a United States district judge of the United States District Court for the District of Ohio.

== Education and career ==
Born on July 26, 1770, on Westover Plantation in Charles City County, Colony of Virginia, British America, Byrd read law in 1794, with Gouverneur Morris in Philadelphia, Pennsylvania and was admitted to the bar. He was a land agent for Philadelphia financier Robert Morris in Lexington, Kentucky from 1794 to 1797. He was in private practice in Philadelphia from 1797 to 1799. He was appointed Secretary of the Northwest Territory by President John Adams on October 3, 1799, serving from 1799 to 1802. Byrd took his oath of office before Governor Arthur St. Clair on February 26, 1800. While serving as Secretary of the Northwest Territory, Byrd also served as a Hamilton county delegate to the 1802 Ohio Constitutional Convention. He was acting Governor of the Northwest Territory from 1802 to 1803. Byrd served as Secretary of the Northwest Territory until Ohio became a state on March 1, 1803. Byrd served as Territorial Governor until Edward Tiffin was duly elected governor of the state of Ohio on March 3, 1803.

== Federal judicial service ==
Following the admission of the Northwest Territory to the Union as the State of Ohio on March 1, 1803, Byrd was nominated by President Thomas Jefferson on March 1, 1803, to the United States District Court for the District of Ohio, to a new seat authorized by 2 Stat. 201. He was confirmed by the United States Senate on March 3, 1803, and received his commission the same day. His service terminated on August 25, 1828, due to his death in Sinking Spring, Ohio. He was interred at the old rural cemetery in Sinking Spring.

=== Notable cases ===
In its first session, the court participated in the trial of Aaron Burr. The indictment charged Burr and Harman Blennerhassett, with commencing an expedition to wage war against Spain via Mexico, but the charges were eventually dropped in 1819. Another notable case for the court was Osborn v. Bank of the United States, which arose out of the attempt of the Ohio Legislature to tax out of existence the bank's branches in Cincinnati and Chillicothe by imposing an annual $50,000 tax on each branch. The case reached the United States Supreme Court and the tax was held invalid following the case of McCulloch v. Maryland.

== Family ==
Coat of Arms of Charles Willing Byrd

Byrd was the son of Colonel William Byrd III and Mary Willing Byrd. He was also the grandson of William Byrd II, who is considered the founder of Richmond, Virginia. While in the service of Robert Morris in Kentucky, Byrd married Sarah Waters Meade, the daughter of his father's friend, Colonel David Meade, on April 6, 1797. On June 8, 1807, Byrd and his wife purchased a tract of 600 acres (2.4 km^{2}) in Monroe Township, Adams County, Ohio, known as Buckeye Station and Hurricane Hill, from their brother-in-law, General Nathaniel Massie. The Byrds' home sat on a ridge overlooking Kentucky and the Ohio River. After his wife's death on February 21, 1815, Byrd moved to Chillicothe, Ohio where he lived and worked for a year before moving to West Union, Ohio. While residing in West Union, Byrd met and married Hannah Miles (died August 14, 1839) on March 8, 1818.

== Food and nutrition habits ==
From his diary, Byrd showed an extreme consciousness on matters of physical health and religion. Byrd purchased an area called "Sinking Spring" in Highland County because he believed the waters there possessed medicinal properties conducive to health and longevity. He guarded the diets of his family and himself. By his place at the dining table, Byrd kept a small silver scale, upon which he weighed every article of food allowing a certain quantity of fat, sugar and phosphates with each portion given to himself and his family. Byrd, along with at least one of his sons, had a deep interest in the Shakers movement and made significant donations to the movement.

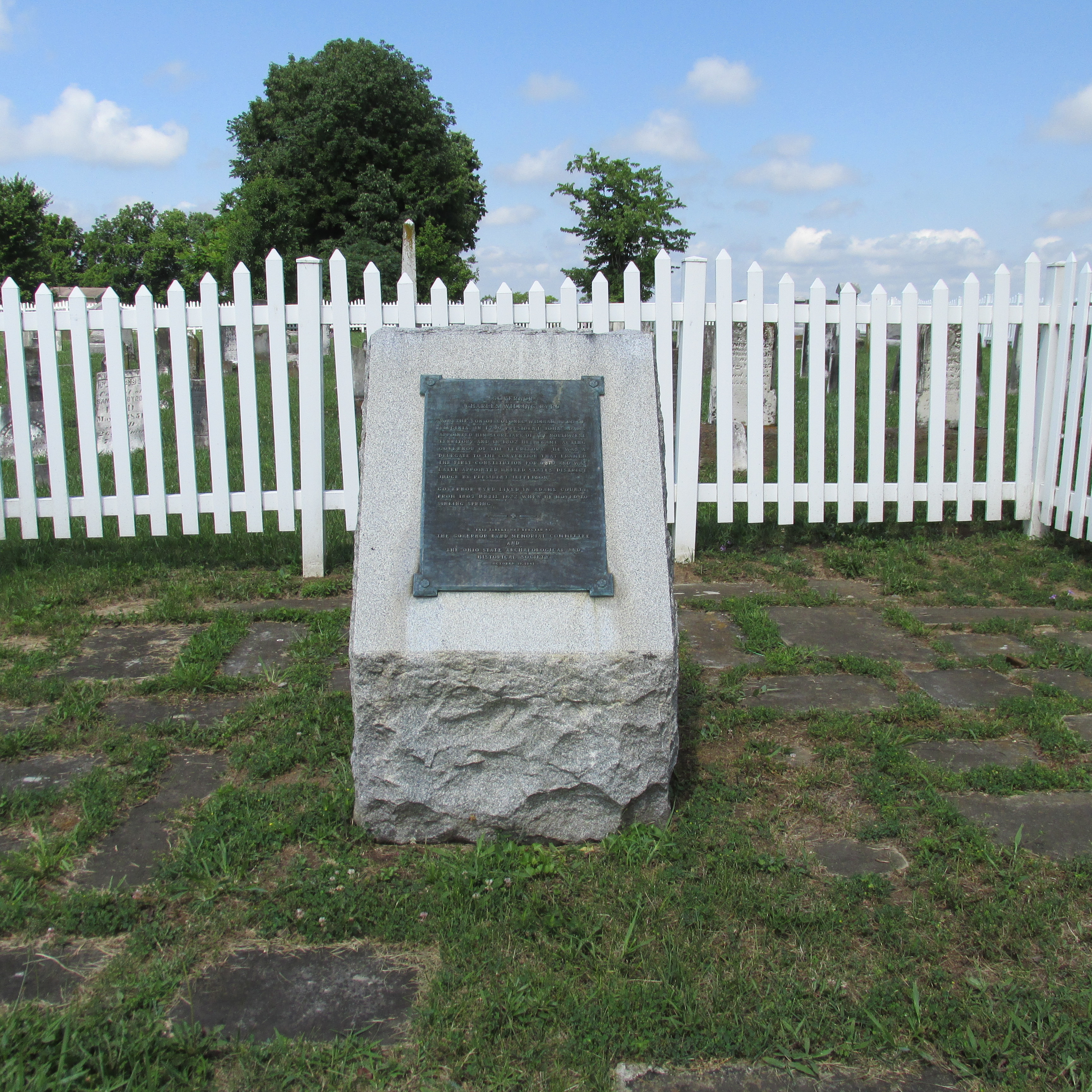
Charles Byrd Memorial Marker. Dedicated October 19, 1941

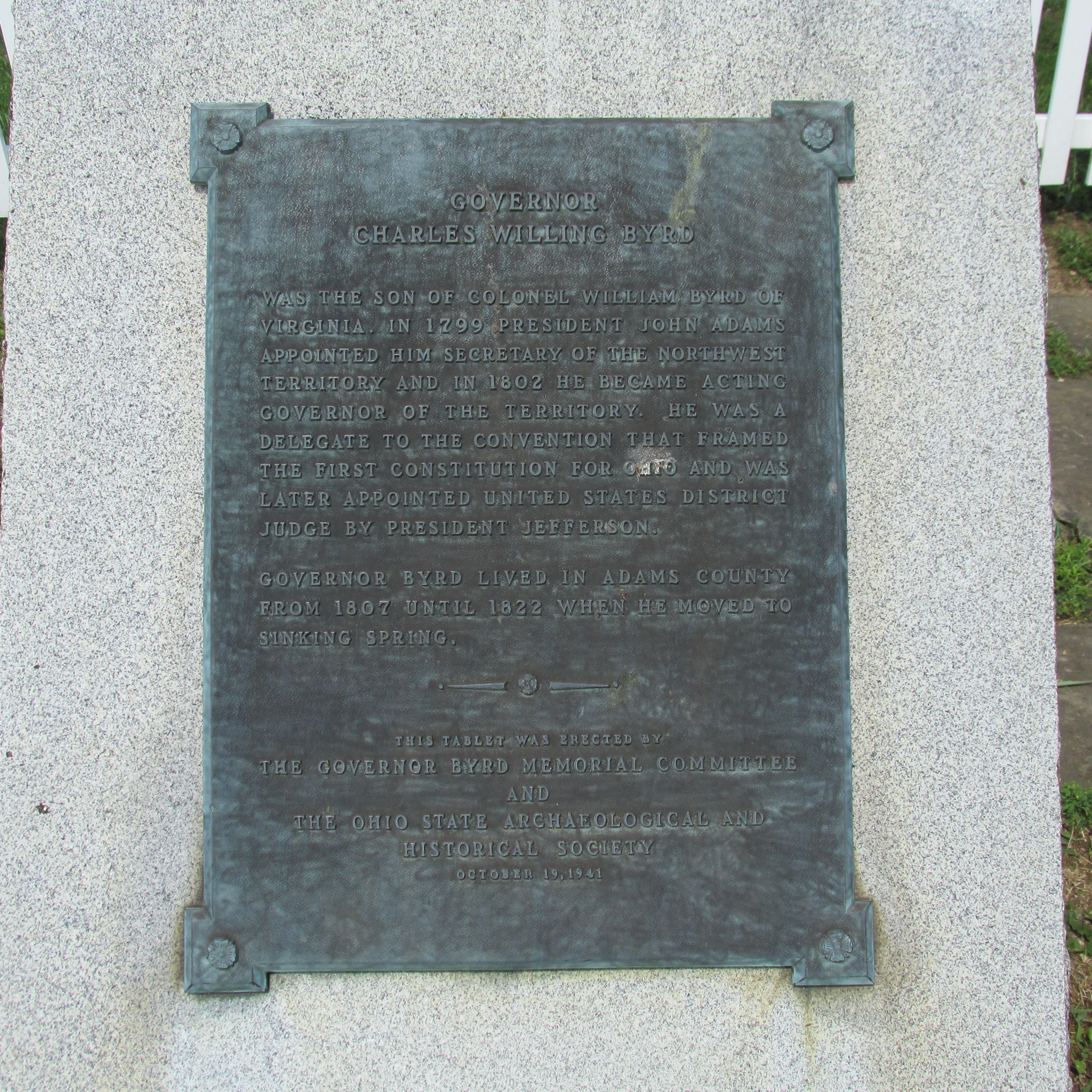
Charles Byrd Memorial Plaque. Dedicated October 19, 1941

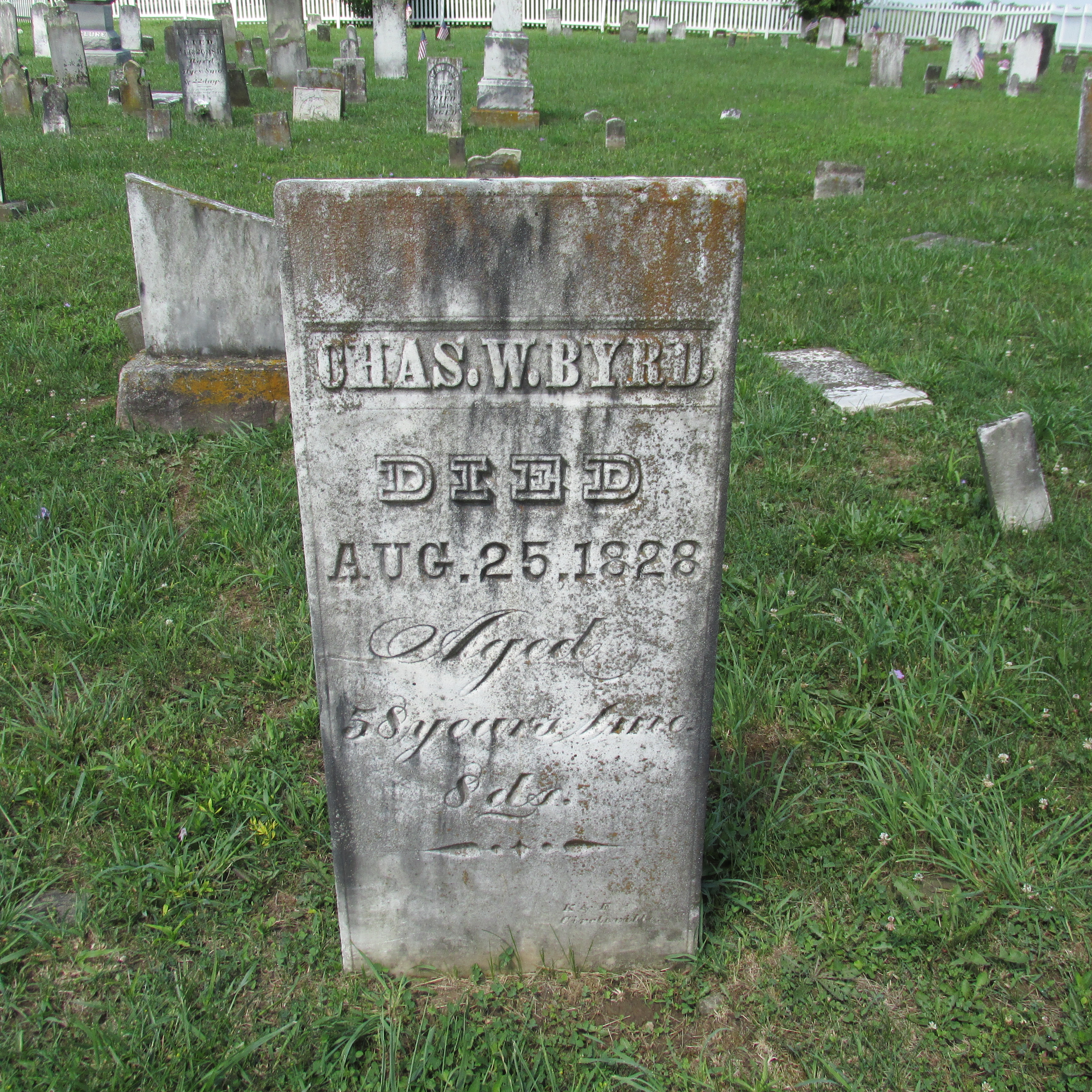
Charles Byrd Tombstone

Political offices
Preceded by William Henry Harrison	Secretary of Northwest Territory; 1800–1803	Succeeded by Office abolished
Preceded by Arthur St. Clair	Governor of Northwest Territory; 1802–1803	Succeeded by Office abolished
Legal offices
Preceded by Seat established by 2 Stat. 201	Judge of the United States District Court for the District of Ohio; 1803–1828	Succeeded by William Creighton Jr.
