= Maria Taylor Byrd =

American plantation manager (1698–1771)

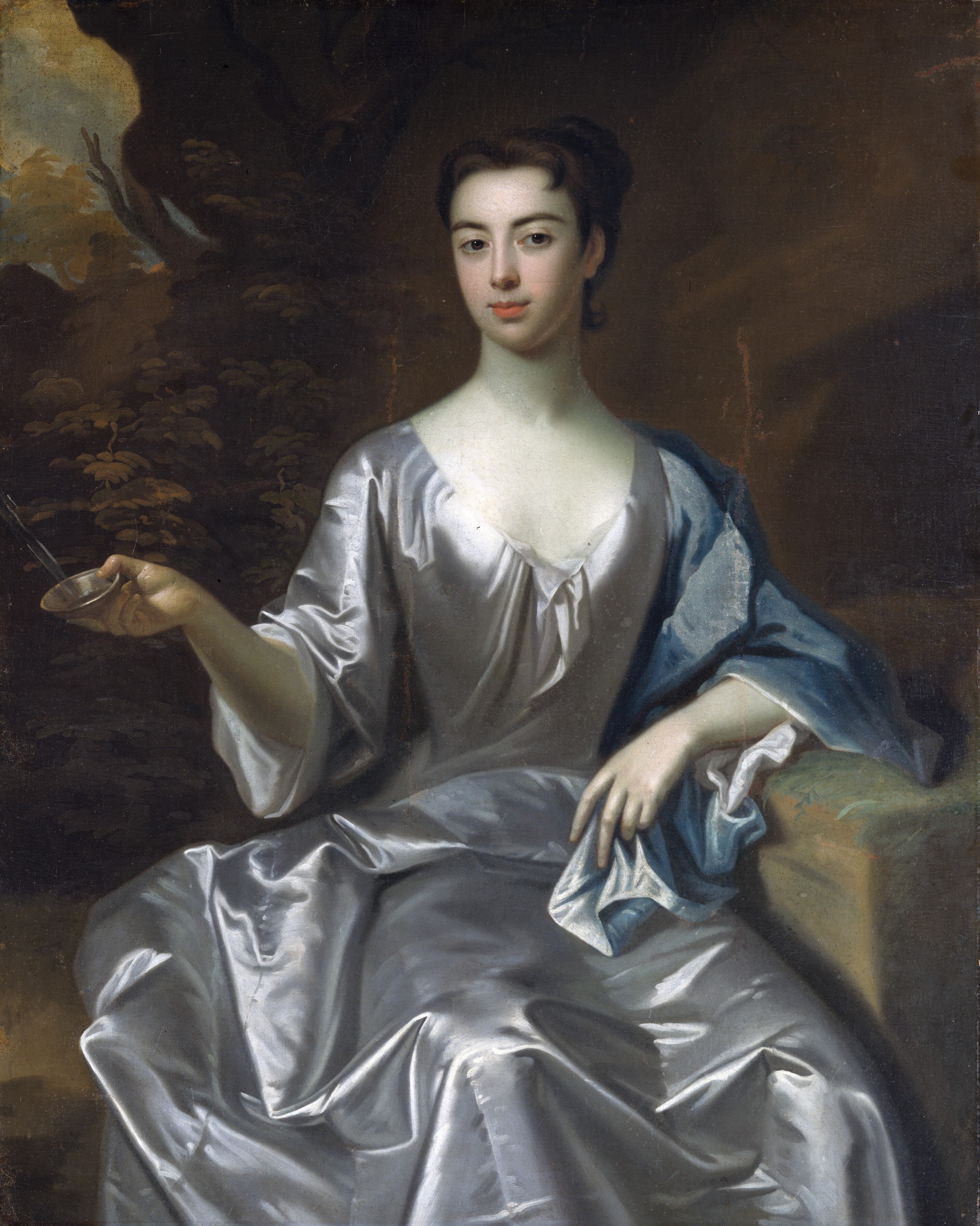
- Born: November 10, 1698; England
- Died: August 28, 1771 (aged 72); Virginia

Maria Taylor Byrd (November 10, 1698 – August 28, 1771) was an English-born woman who managed her and her husband William Byrd II's Westover Plantation during his periods of absence. During their lifetimes, William Byrd III and Maria Taylor Byrd's holdings increased to 179,423 acres of land and hundreds of slaves. After he died, she was to manage the estate only until her son William Byrd III came of age, but he had married and decided to live with his wife at the family's Belvidere plantation instead. Byrd then continued to manage Westover through her son's first marriage and until her death. She oversaw the plantation's activities, its slaves, household duties, and the care and upkeep of the property on the plantation.

== Early life ==
Maria Taylor Byrd was born on November 10, 1698. She was the eldest daughter and a co-heiress of a gentleman from Kensington, England, Thomas Taylor. Her sister Anne married Captain Francis Otway.

She had a good education and was well-read. Upon learning of her skill with languages, William Byrd II wrote her a letter written in Greek: "When indeed I learned that you also spoke Greek, the tongue of the Muses, I went completely crazy about you".

She was a writer of Belles-lettres. She had a copy of The Works of Mr Abraham Cowley Consisting of Those which were formerly printed: and Those which he Design'd for the Press of Abraham Cowley. It was rare for a woman of the Thirteen Colonies to own such a book.

== Marriage ==
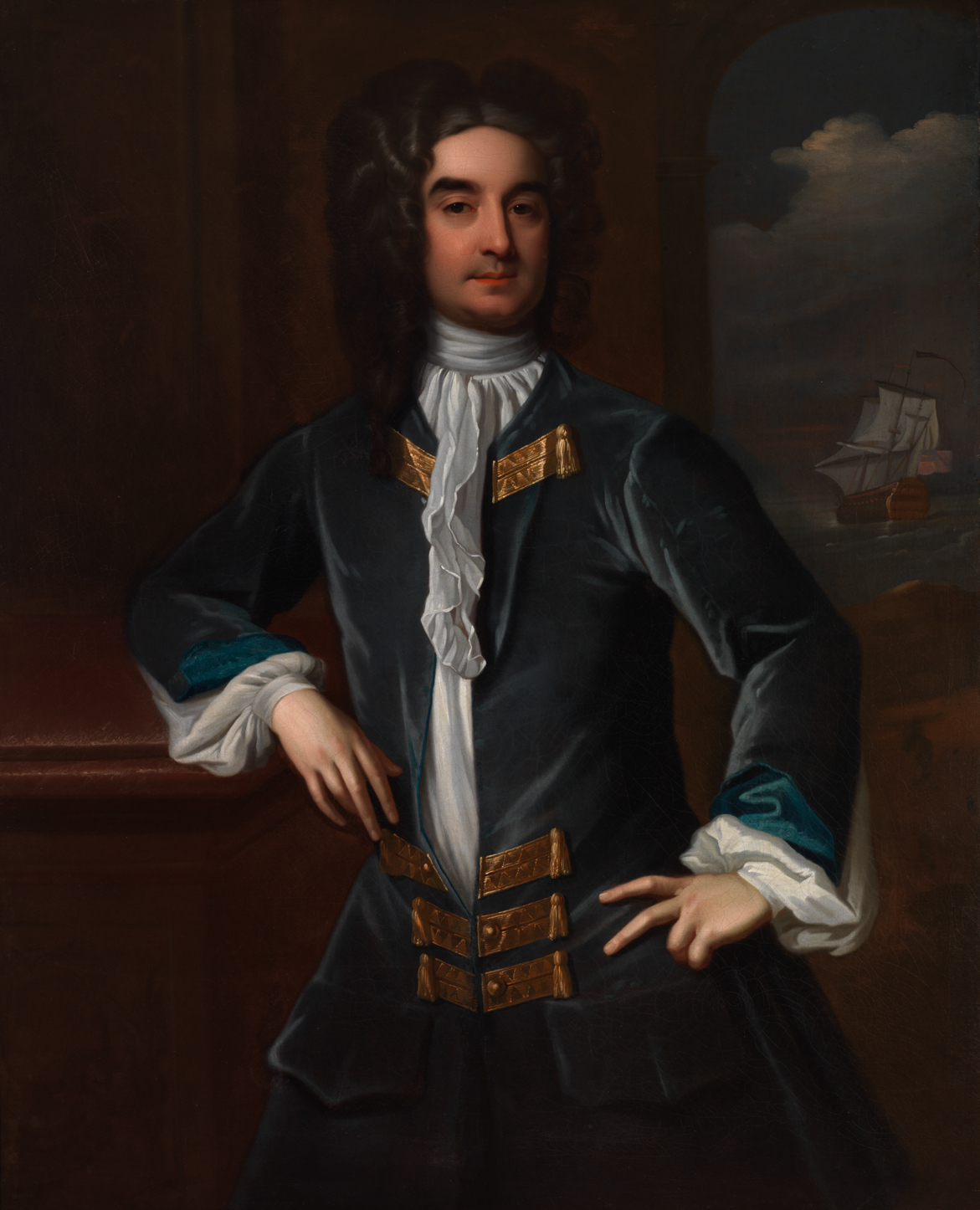
c. 1724 portrait of William Byrd II by Hans Hysing

On May 9, 1724, she married William Byrd II, the only son of William Byrd I in London. It was his second marriage. William Byrd II was educated in London, England and was there from 1697 to 1705 and then 1715 to 1726. A member of the wealthy planter class, he was one of the richest men in the Colony of Virginia.

In 1726, they sailed to Virginia and settled at the Westover Plantation. In the 1720s and 1730s, Virginia's elite class began to "cultivate a sense of civilized living and grace," according to scholar Peter Martin. The Byrds relied on Westover to produce wealth and afford them a lifestyle befitting their class. According to biographer Kathleen M. Brown, it provided them a "personal arena for mastery" that did not require them to perform manual labor themselves. Meat, vegetables and fruit were produced at Westover. They had domestic slaves. A white woman called "Nurse" and Anaka, an enslaved women, cared for the children. Two other bondswomen, Moll was a cook and Jenny took care of household duties.

They had children: Anne Carter, Ann Gathright, Maria Taylor Carter, Colonel William Byrd III, and Jane Page.

== Manage estate ==
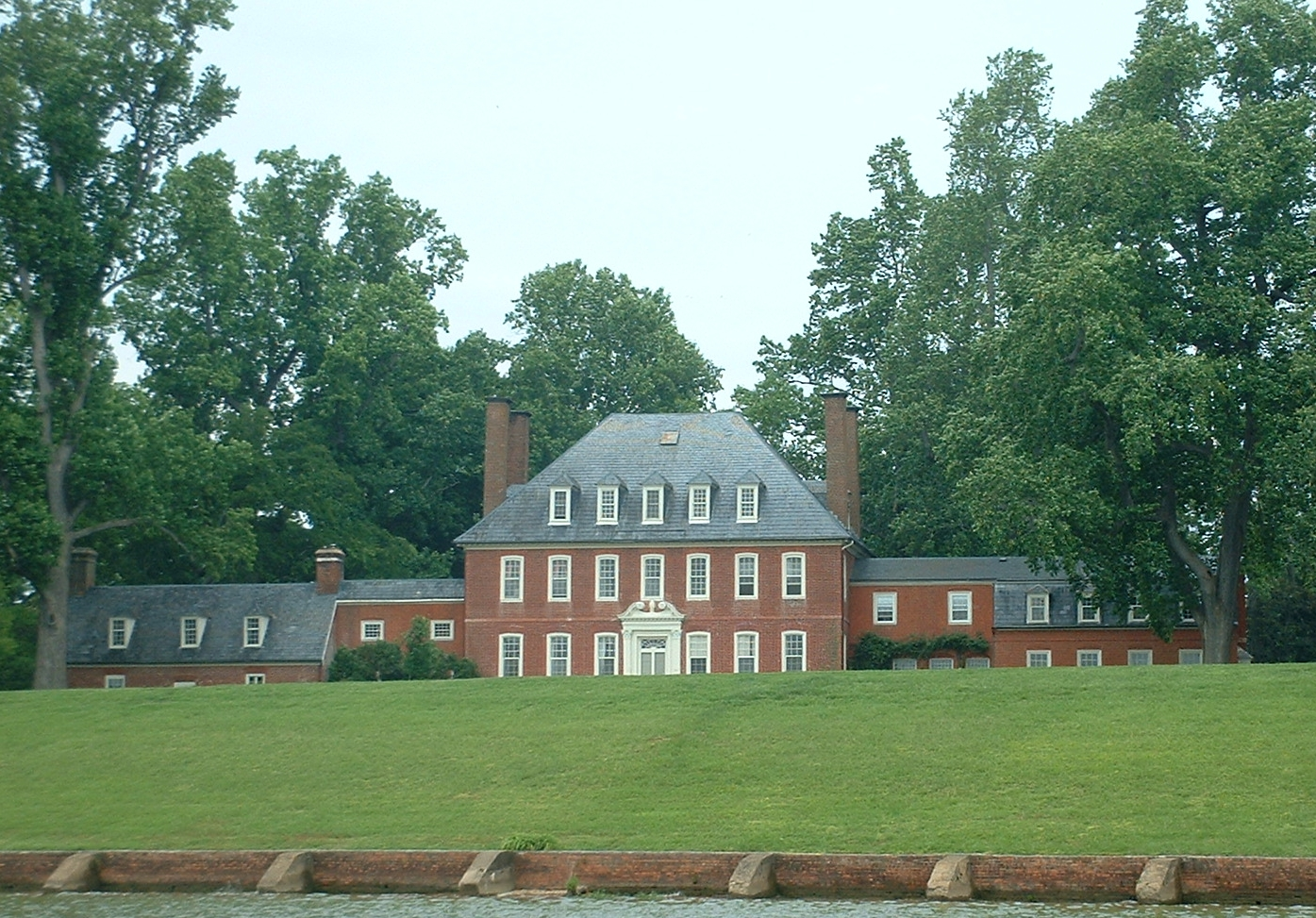
Westover Plantation, Charles City County, Virginia

Byrd managed the estate while her husband was away. She oversaw the work of employees and enslaved people, settled household matters, and oversaw growing and harvesting the farm's produce, including wheat. The Byrd's property included 179,423 acres of land and hundreds of enslaved people.

Her husband described running the plantation:

Like one of the patriarchs, I have my flocks, my bond-men, and bond-women, and every sort of trade amongst my own servants, so that I live in a kind of independence on every one, but Providence. How ever tho' this sort of life is without expense yet it is attended with a great deal of trouble. I must take care to keep all my people to their duty, to set all the springs in motion, and to make every one draw his equal share to carry the machine forward.

— William Byrd II

After her husband died in 1744, she became the owner of Westover and its enslaved workers, and became a prominent property owner in the colony, until her only son William Byrd III came of age at 21, according to the terms of the willf. He was 15 when his father died.

William Byrd III did not take over Westover when he came of age. He and Elizabeth Hill Carter were married in 1748 and lived at Belvidere, another Byrd estate, in Richmond, Virginia. Byrd had some disputes with her daughter-in-law. Byrd continued to manage Westover. In her letters to her son, Byrfd told him of decisions she made and sometimes sought his advice, such as questions she asked him about the windmill, purchasing and maintaining horses, and agriculture.

The mansion was destroyed by a fire in 1748 or 1749, which required rebuilding of the house. Since this was during the period that William Byrd III lived at Belvidere, it is assumed that Byrd oversaw the reconstruction of the Westover mansion. She coordinated work that continued into 1761 when brick walls of two gardens were replaced.

In 1756, William left his wife and children at Belvidere and fought in the French and Indian War under Lord Loudoun. At that time, he was said to have repudiated his wife and had decided not to return to her. He put the running of Belvidere in the hands of his friends. During his five-year absence from his family, his wife died in 1760. In 1761, William married Mary Willing and they began living at Westover in 1762.

After William Byrd III took ownership of Westover, William Byrd II's will allowed her to live at Westover for the remainder of her life and to receive 200 pounds sterling each year as long as she was unmarried. However, she was involved in the oversight of Westover until her death. Her son took over management of Westover and he managed the estate poorly and became deeply in debt by the time of his death in 1777. His wife Mary Willing Byrd inherited the estate and ran it successfully.

== Death ==
Maria Taylor Byrd died on August 28, 1771, at Westover Plantation. She is buried at Westover Plantation.
