= Sinking Spring, Ohio =

- Village
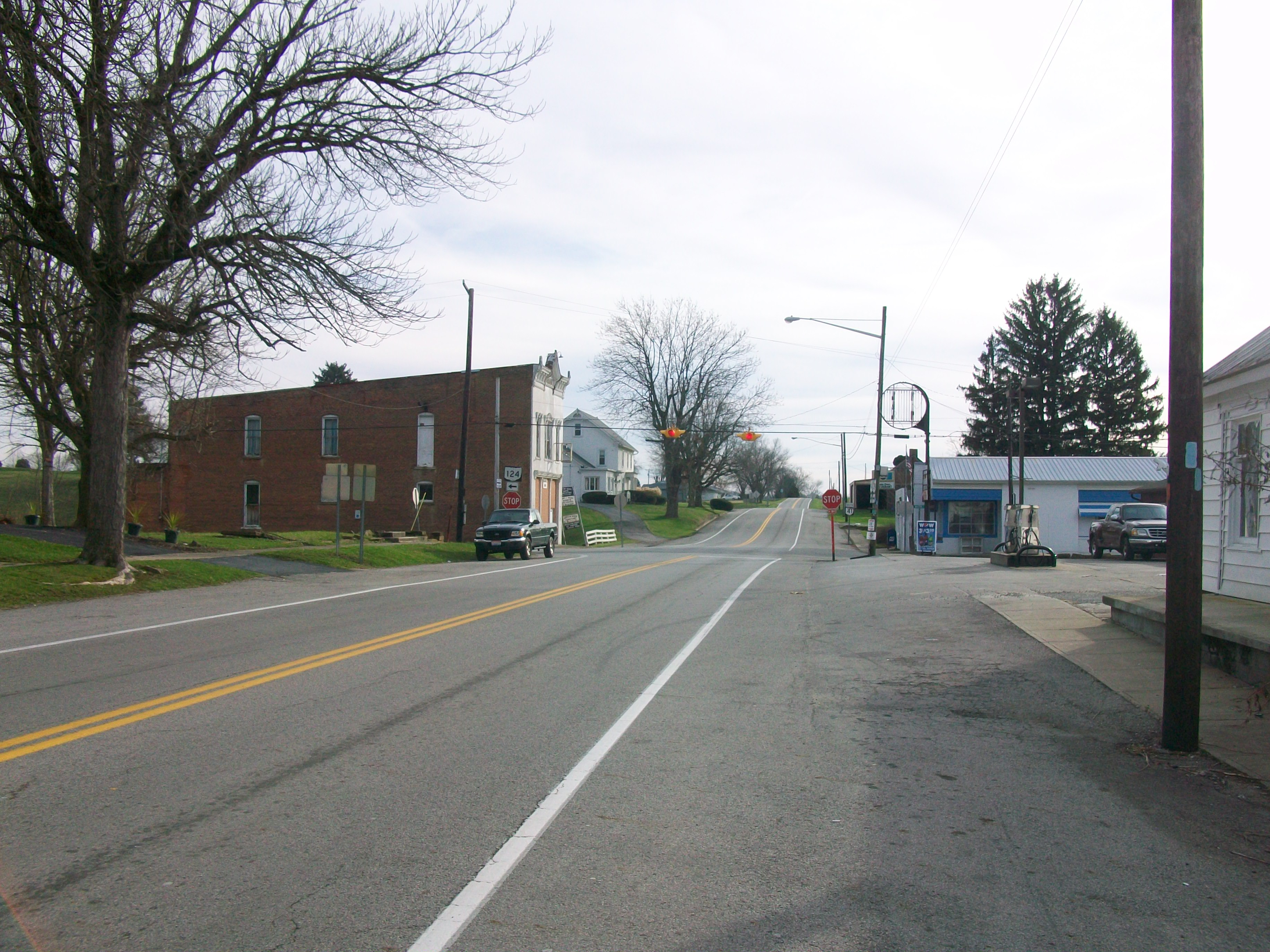
- Looking south on Main Street (Ohio State Route 41) in Sinking Spring

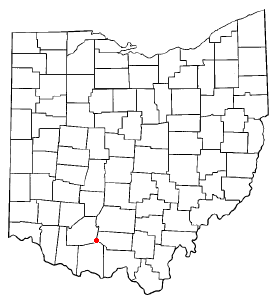
- Location of Sinking Spring, Ohio

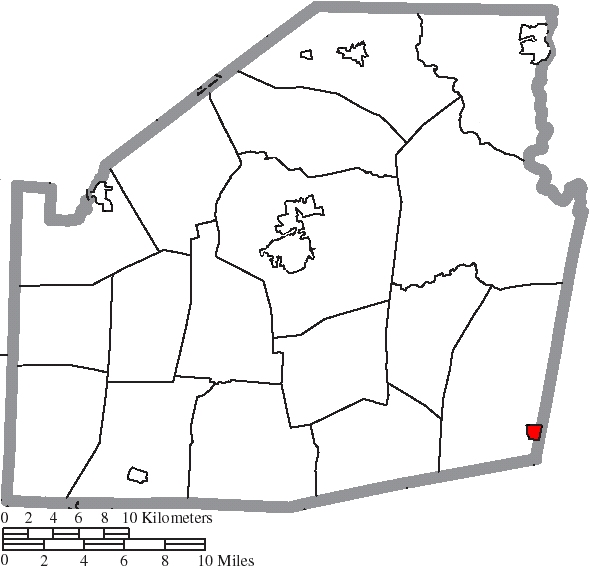
- Location of Sinking Spring in Highland County
- Coordinates: 39°04′29″N 83°23′13″W
- Country: United States
- State: Ohio
- County: Highland

Area
  - Total: 0.47 sq mi (1.21 km^{2})
  - Land: 0.47 sq mi (1.21 km^{2})
  - Water: 0 sq mi (0.00 km^{2})
- Elevation: 879 ft (268 m)

Population (2020)
  - Total: 118
  - Density: 252.7/sq mi (97.55/km^{2})
- Time zone: UTC-5 (Eastern (EST))
  - Summer (DST): UTC-4 (EDT)
- ZIP code: 45172
- Area codes: 937, 326
- FIPS code: 39-72578
- GNIS feature ID: 2399826

Sinking Spring is a village in Highland County, Ohio, United States. The population was 118 at the 2020 census.

== History ==
A post office called Sinking Spring has been in operation since 1817. The village was named for a losing stream near the original town site. This city was noted in the 1980s Sesame Street movie Follow That Bird.

== Geography ==
According to the United States Census Bureau, the village has a total area of 0.47 square miles (1.22 km^{2}), all land.

== Demographics ==
Historical population
Census	Pop.	Note	%±
1830	109		—
1840	75		−31.2%
1870	200		—
1880	107		−46.5%
1900	238		—
1910	187		−21.4%
1920	128		−31.6%
1930	177		38.3%
1940	223		26.0%
1950	187		−16.1%
1960	202		8.0%
1970	178		−11.9%
1980	239		34.3%
1990	189		−20.9%
2000	158		−16.4%
2010	133		−15.8%
2020	118		−11.3%
U.S. Decennial Census

=== 2010 census ===
As of the census of 2010, there were 133 people, 53 households, and 37 families living in the village. The population density was 283.0 inhabitants per square mile (109.3/km^{2}). There were 62 housing units at an average density of 131.9 per square mile (50.9/km^{2}). The racial makeup of the village was 100.0% White.

There were 53 households, of which 28.3% had children under the age of 18 living with them, 50.9% were married couples living together, 17.0% had a female householder with no husband present, 1.9% had a male householder with no wife present, and 30.2% were non-families. 24.5% of all households were made up of individuals, and 13.2% had someone living alone who was 65 years of age or older. The average household size was 2.51 and the average family size was 3.03.

The median age in the village was 45.2 years. 23.3% of residents were under the age of 18; 7.5% were between the ages of 18 and 24; 18.9% were from 25 to 44; 27.1% were from 45 to 64; and 23.3% were 65 years of age or older. The gender makeup of the village was 49.6% male and 50.4% female.

=== 2000 census ===
As of the census of 2000, there were 158 people, 57 households, and 44 families living in the village. The population density was 337.6 inhabitants per square mile (130.3/km^{2}). There were 63 housing units at an average density of 134.6 per square mile (52.0/km^{2}). The racial makeup of the village was 97.47% White, 1.90% Native American, and 0.63% from two or more races.

There were 57 households, out of which 45.6% had children under the age of 18 living with them, 61.4% were married couples living together, 12.3% had a female householder with no husband present, and 21.1% were non-families. 17.5% of all households were made up of individuals, and 15.8% had someone living alone who was 65 years of age or older. The average household size was 2.77 and the average family size was 3.04.

In the village, the population was spread out, with 27.8% under the age of 18, 8.9% from 18 to 24, 34.8% from 25 to 44, 15.2% from 45 to 64, and 13.3% who were 65 years of age or older. The median age was 32 years. For every 100 females there were 88.1 males. For every 100 females age 18 and over, there were 83.9 males.

The median income for a household in the village was $38,750, and the median income for a family was $47,500. Males had a median income of $38,333 versus $21,875 for females. The per capita income for the village was $15,089. About 7.7% of families and 7.7% of the population were below the poverty line, including none of those under the age of eighteen and 28.6% of those 65 or over.

== Notable person ==
- Charles Willing Byrd, early Ohio political leader and jurist

== Gallery ==
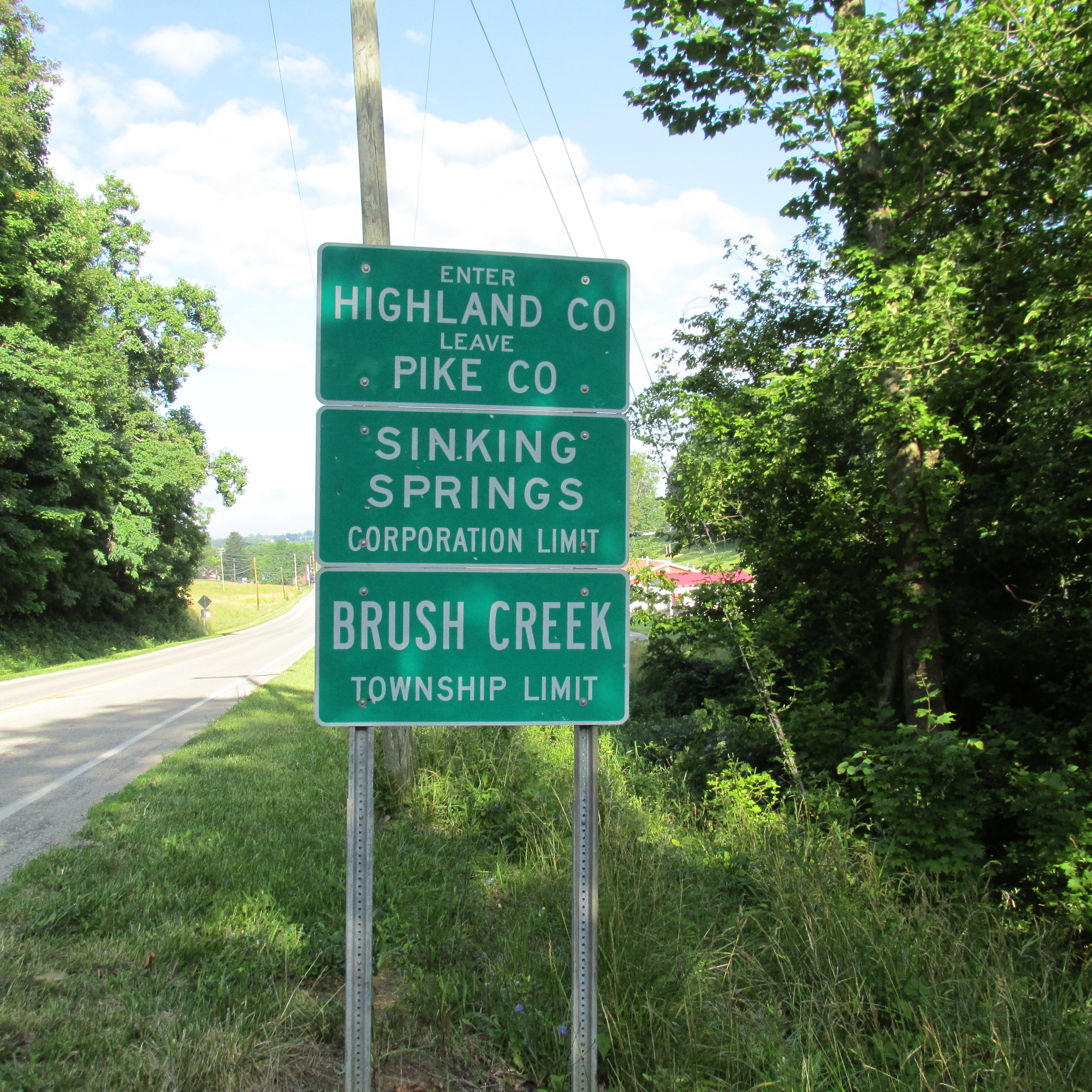
Sinking Spring corporation limit sign

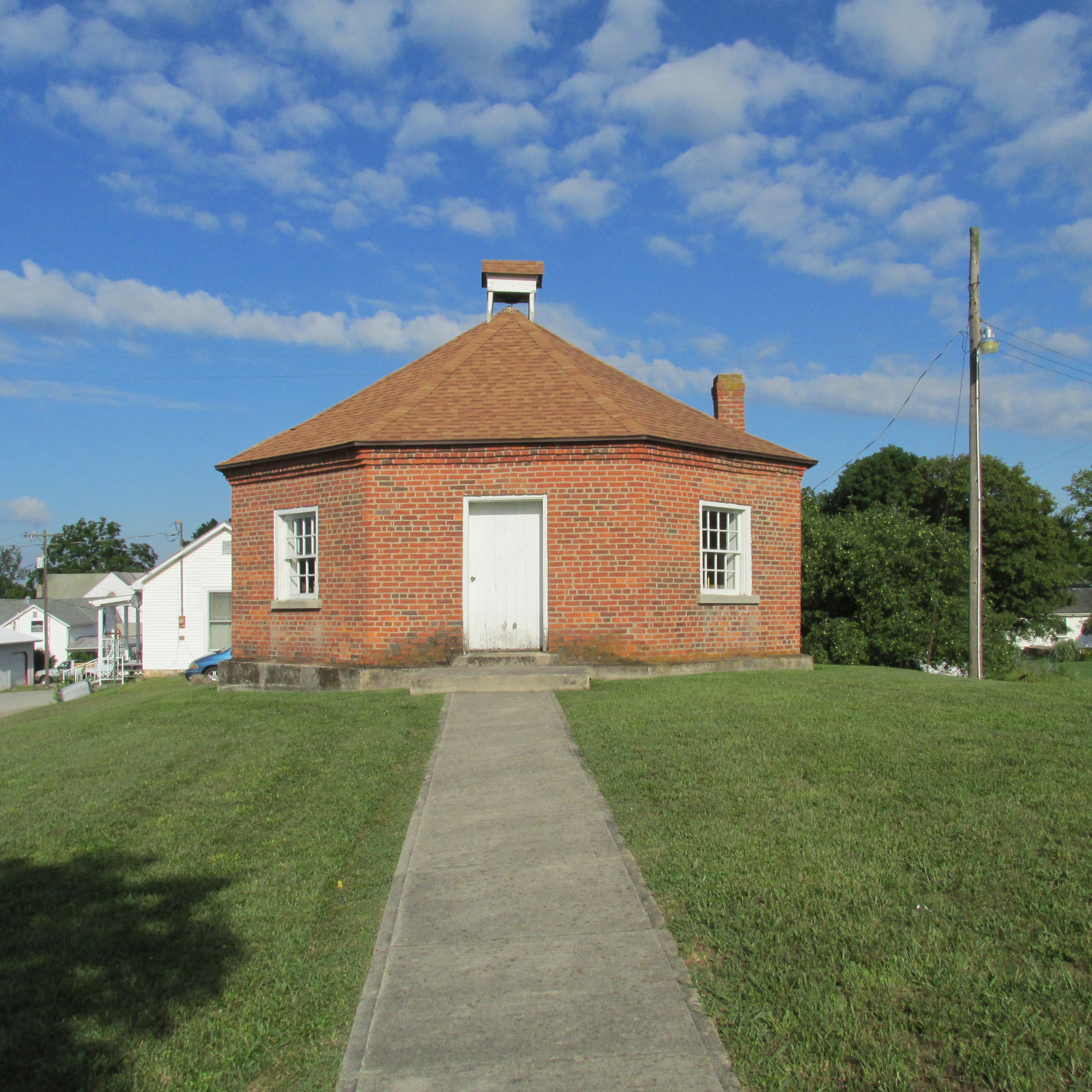
Octagonal Schoolhouse constructed in 1831

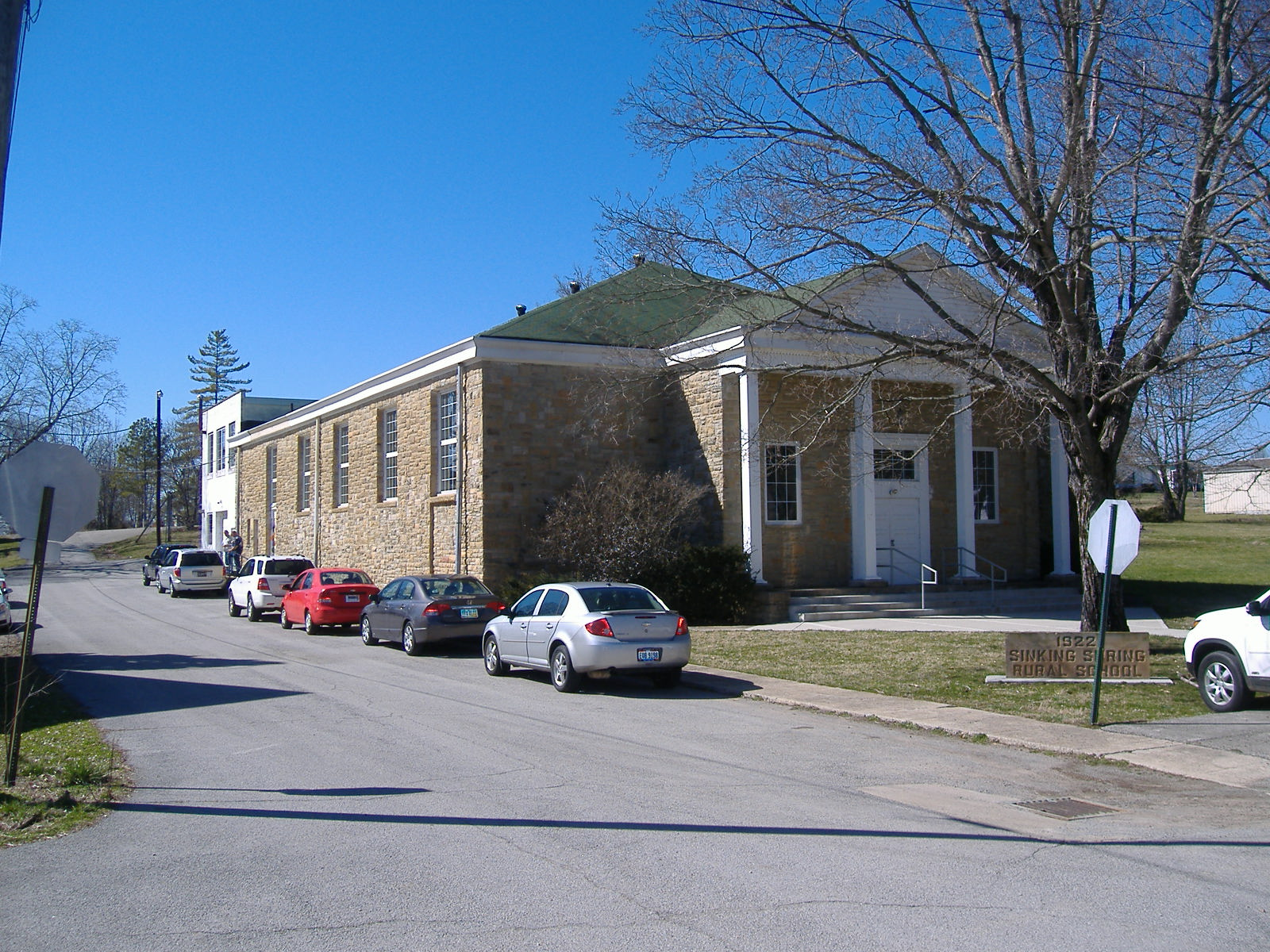
Sinking Spring Community Center, former gymnasium for Sinking Spring High School, Constructed in 1938 with rear addition added in 1951

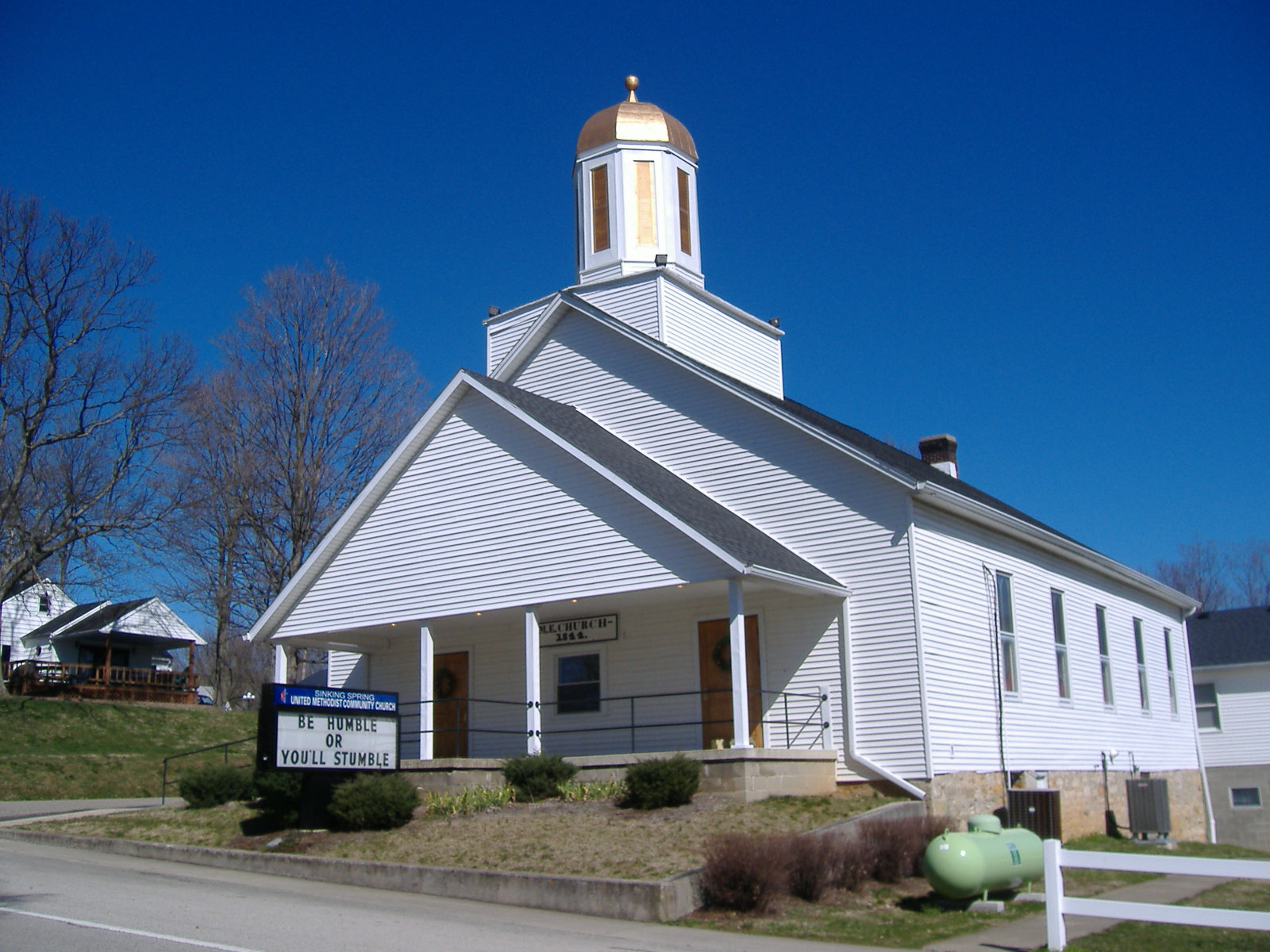
Sinking Spring Methodist Church, constructed in 1844 and is the oldest church in Highland County still being used as a church

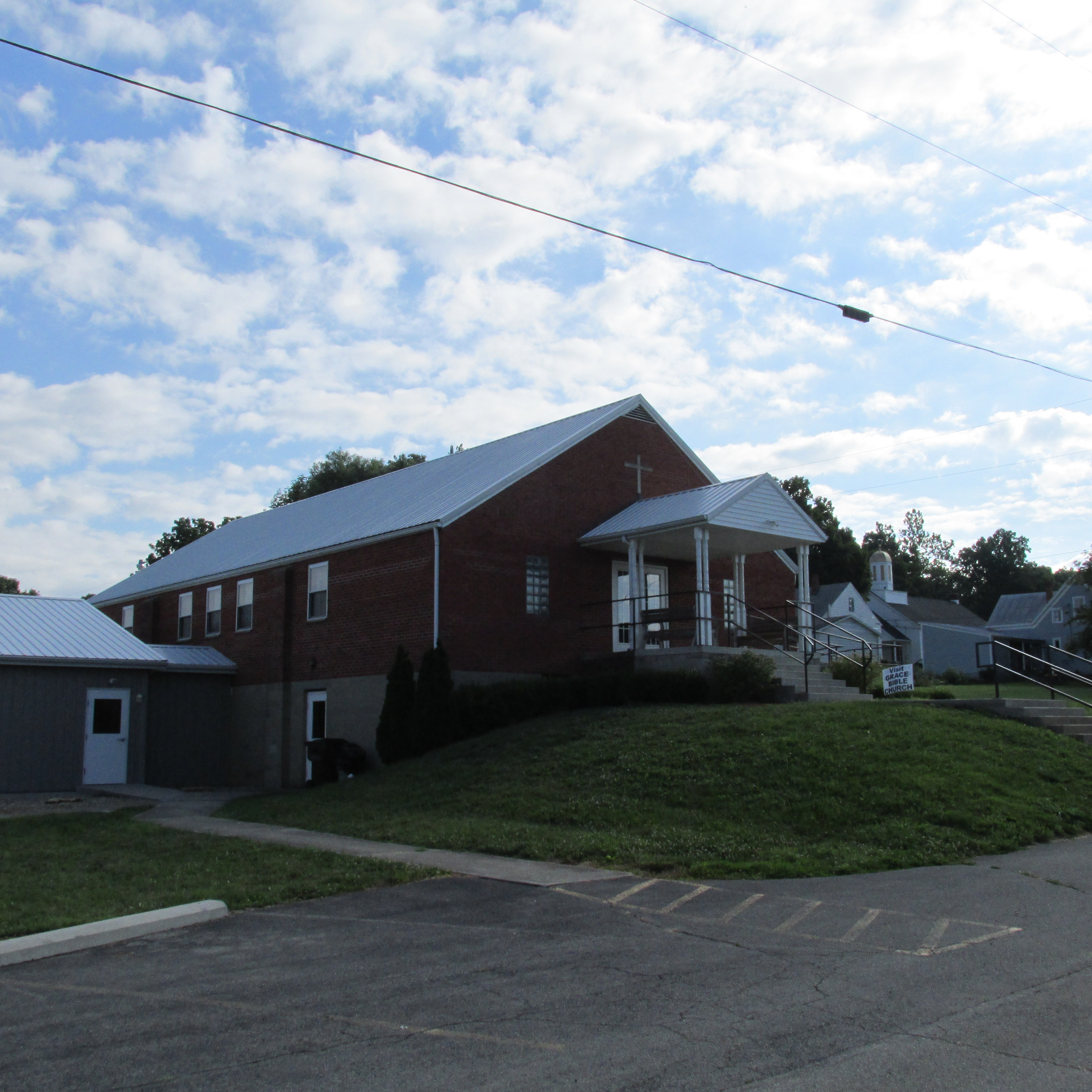
Grace Bible Church

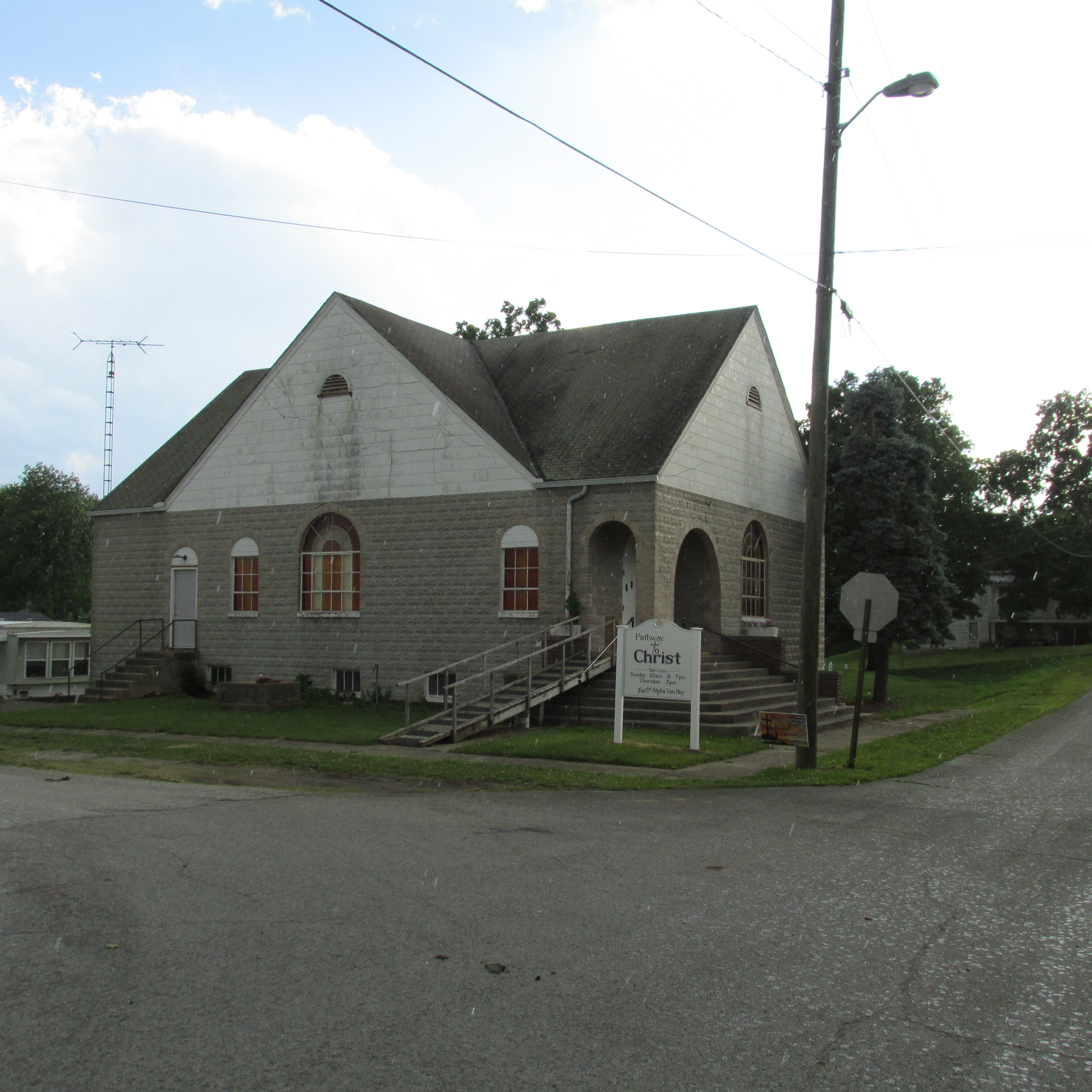
Pathway To Christ Church

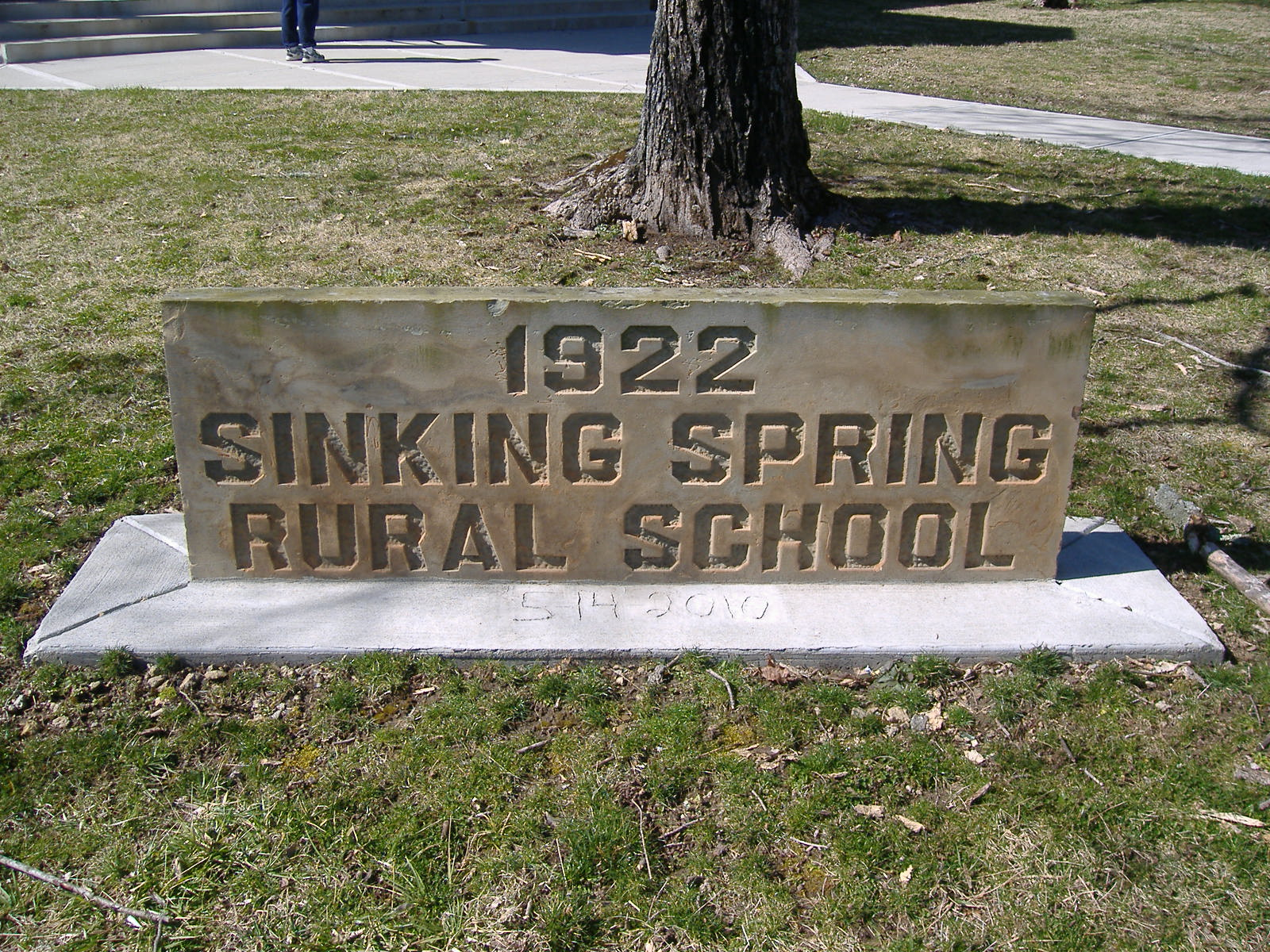
Cornerstone of the former Sinking Spring High School outside of Community Center, set in place May 14, 2010

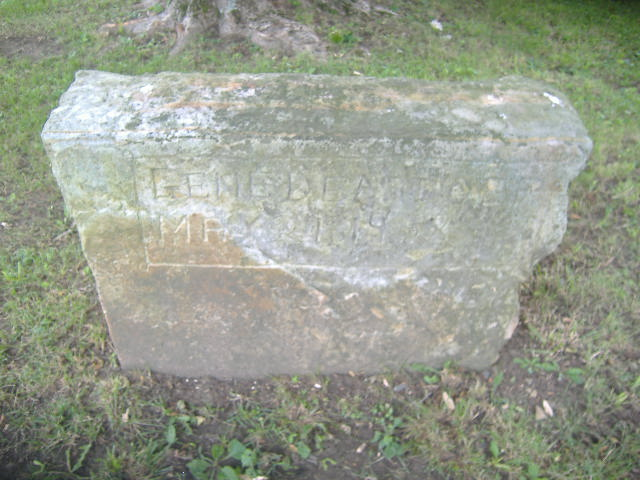
Stone outside Community Center, inscription reads "Gene Deardoff May 21, 1938"

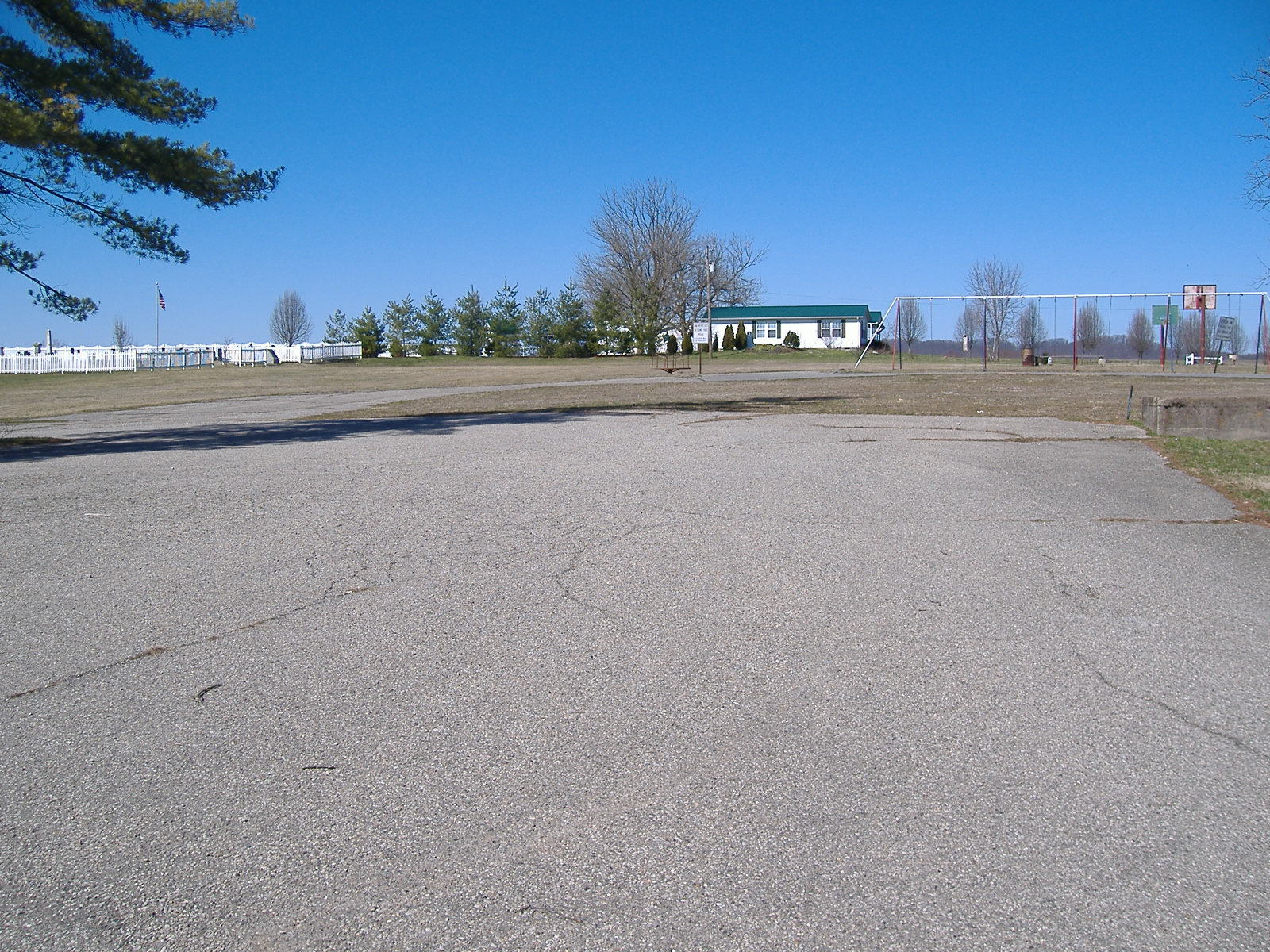
Site of the former Sinking Spring High School, destroyed by fire on March 25, 1998

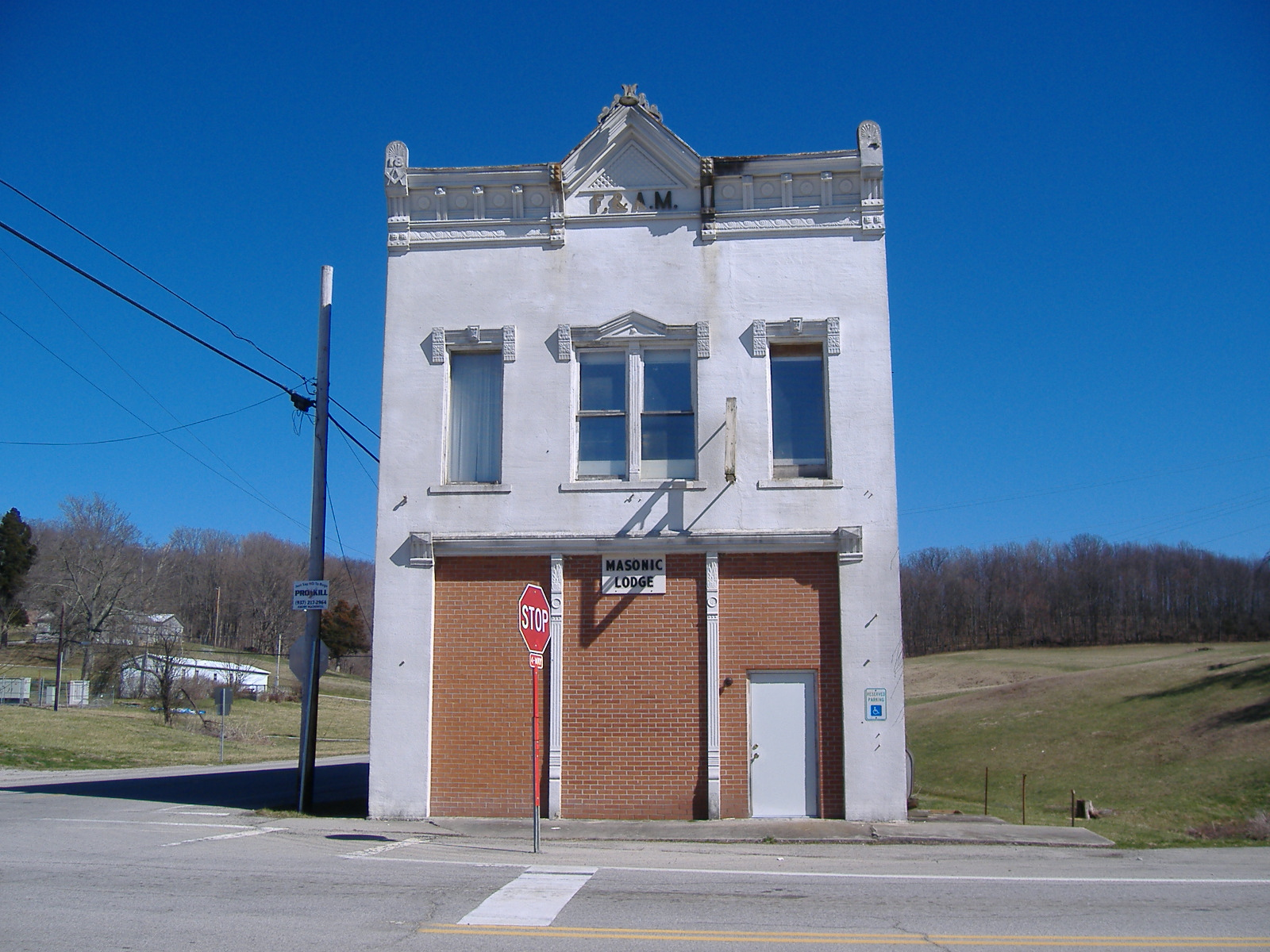
Sinking Spring Masonic Lodge constructed in 1894

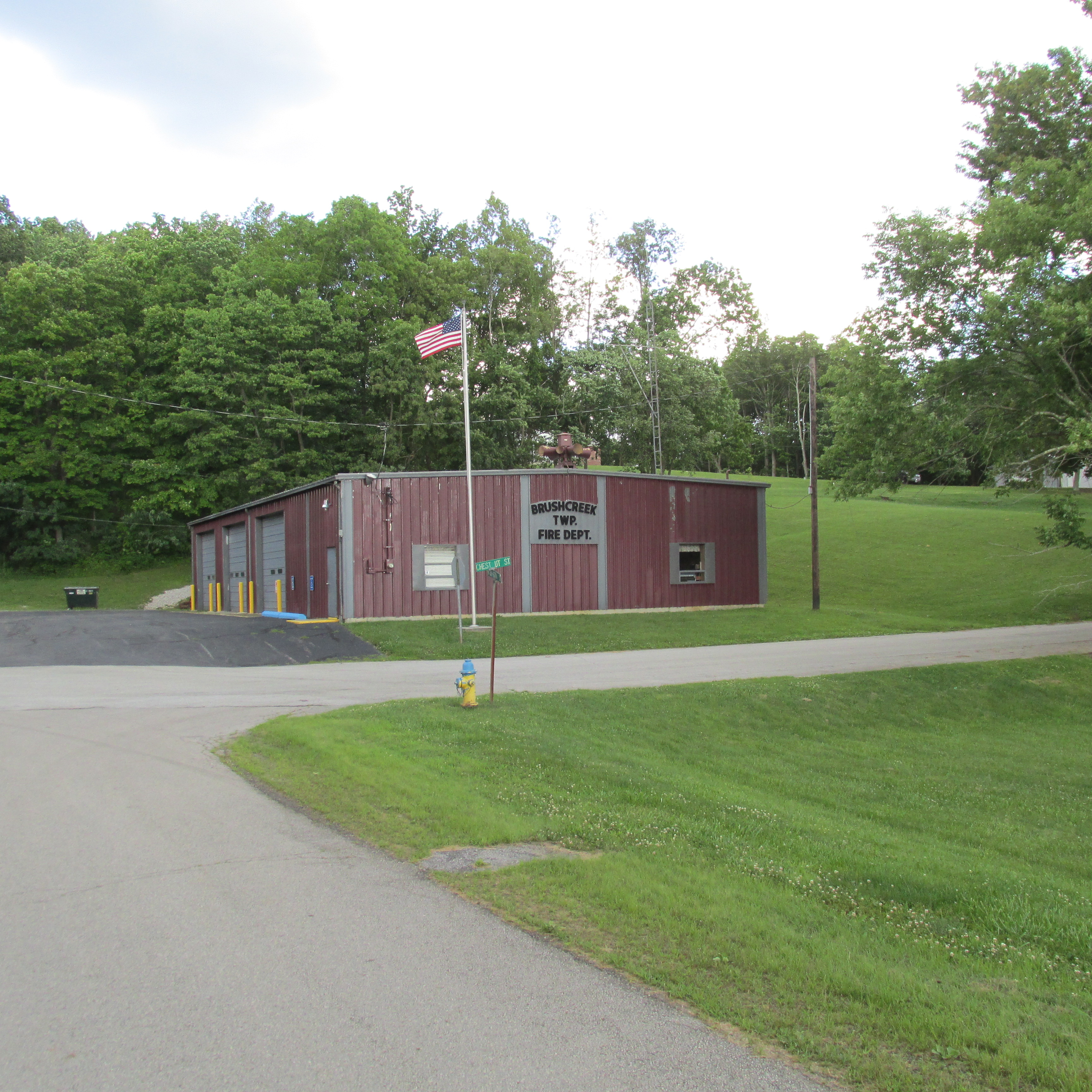
Brushcreek Township Fire Department

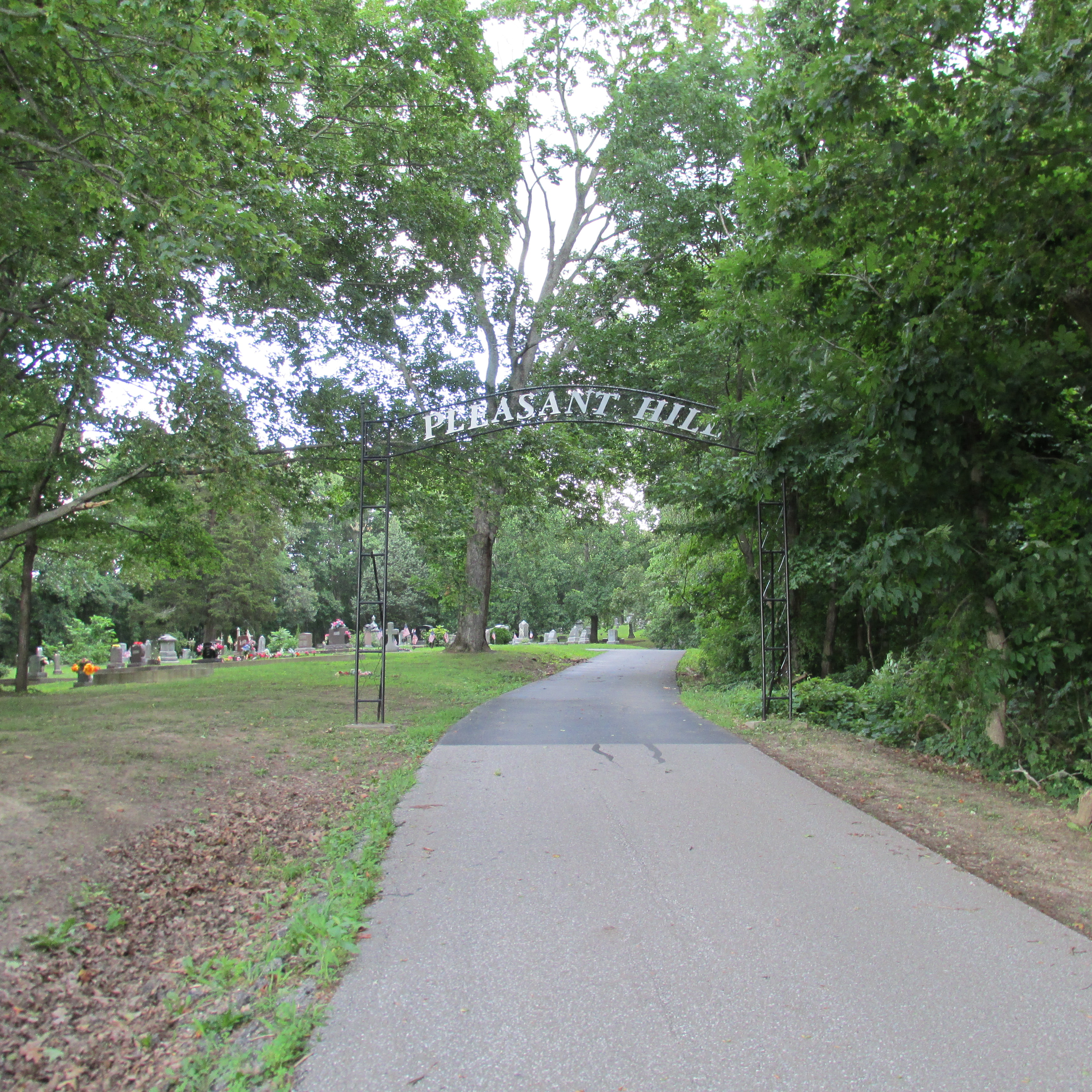
Pleasant Hill Cemetery
