= Mary Willing Byrd =

American plantation owner (1740–1814)

- Portrait by Matthew Pratt, c. 1773
- Born: Mary Willing; September 10, 1740
- Died: March 28, 1814 (aged 73); Westover Plantation, Charles City County, Virginia, U.S.
- Resting place: Westover Church, Charles City County, Virginia
- Spouse: William Byrd III (m. January 29, 1761, d. 1777)
- Children: 10, including Charles Willing Byrd
- Parent(s): Charles Willing; Anne Shippen
- Relatives: Thomas Willing (brother); Elizabeth Willing Powel (sister); Edward Shippen (great-grandfather)

Mary Willing Byrd (September 10, 1740 – March 28, 1814) was an American planter. At twenty years of age, she became the step-mother of five children and managed the family and household at Westover Plantation in Charles City County, Virginia beginning her second year of marriage. Together Byrd and her husband, William Byrd III, had ten more children before he committed suicide in 1777. She determined what property to hold on to and what to sell of what she inherited so that she could pay off debts, preserve Westover Plantation, and retain some land for the Byrd children.

During the American Revolutionary War, British forces seized some of her property and when she tried to regain it, the State of Virginia accused her of dealing with the enemy. After she explained the situation in letters, the case was dropped and did not go to trial.

== Early life ==
Mary Willing, the daughter of Ann (née Shippen) and Charles Willing of Philadelphia, was born on September 10, 1740. Charles Willing was the mayor of Philadelphia from 1748 to 1754, and her great-grandfather, Edward Shippen, was the second mayor of Philadelphia, from 1701 to 1703.

Charles Willing was also a wealthy merchant. One of her godfathers, Benjamin Franklin provided Mary parliamentary speeches and histories from Europe.

== Marriage and children ==
William Byrd III, the wealthy heir of Westover plantation, c. 1747–1750

Mary Willing, the second wife of Colonel William Byrd III, became Mary Willing Byrd upon their marriage on January 29, 1761. William's father, William Byrd II, founded Richmond, Virginia and he built the mansion on Westover. The 179,440-acre plantation was inherited by William III in 1744 when he was 19. During the French and Indian War (1754–1763), William led the Second Virginia Regiment. He remained a Tory after fighting for the King during the Frencha and Indian War.

William was first married on April 14, 1748, to Elizabeth Hill Carter, the daughter of John Carter of Shirley Plantation of Charles City County, Virginia. William and Elizabeth had five children,

- William, born August 2, 1749, died in France in 1771, when fighting or traveling. A lieutenant of the Seventeenth Regiment in the British Army (Note: William is also said to have died young.)
- John Carter, born January 27, 1751, married Mary Page, the widow of William Randolph of Wilton, they had no children.
- Thomas Taylor, born January 17, 1752, married Mary Armstead, daughter of William Armstead of Hesse, Gloucester. (Note: Thomas and Mary Taylor's son Richard married Anne Harrison. She was a cousin and the granddaughter of Mary Willing Bryd and William Byrd.) A captain, he fought for the British.
- Elizabeth Hill, born November 29, 1754, married three times to James Parke Early, Rev. Mr. John Dunbar, and Colonel Henry Skipwith.
- Francis Otway, born May 8, 1756, officer for the British Navy until the Revolutionary War when he fought for America, married Anne Mumford.

Elizabeth died on July 5, 1760. Byrd and William first lived in Philadelphia and Byrd became step-mother to William's children with Elizabeth. In 1762, the couple moved to the Westover Plantation, the Byrd estate, in Charles City County, Virginia.

Byrd and William had ten children:

- Maria Horsmanden Byrd, born November 26, 1761 in Philadelphia, married John Page of Pagebrook.
- Annie, born March 25, 1763 in Westover, unmarried.
- Charles Willing Byrd (died as child), born April 8, 1765 or October 8, 1765 in Westover, died August 1766.
- Evelyn Taylor Byrd, born October 3, 1766, or October 13, 1766, married Benjamin Harrison of Brandon.
- Abigail (Abby) Byrd, born November 4, 1767, married Judge William Nelson.
- Dorothy Byrd (died as child), born February 12, 1769 or February 17, 1769, died February 27, 1769.
- Charles Willing Byrd, born July 26, 1770, U.S. District Judge of Ohio, married Sarah Meade.
- Jane, born January 17, 1773, married Carter Bassett Harrison of Maycox.
- Richard Willing, born October 27, 1774, married first Lucy Harrison, daughter of Benjamin Harrison of Brandon and secondly Emily Wilson. Of Smithfield, Isle of Wight County, member of House of Delegates, died October 1815.
- William Byrd, married Susan Lewis, daughter of Addison Lewis.

William was a Colonial American military officer at the time of the American Revolution. William struggled in his life. His first marriage was "agony". He was not great in business and management of his finances. He was also troubled by he previous alliance with the King during the French and Indian War. Two of his sons served in the British Army. With the Revolutionary War, "William's friends insulted him, threatened him. His own flesh and blood was fighting against him." William committed suicide on January 1 or 2, 1777, leaving considerable debts. At the time of her husband's death, they had 100 enslaved servants. About 1782, Byrd was 42 and there were four surviving children from William's first marriage who had established their own lives. There were eight surviving children from Byrd and William's marriage that Byrd took care of and ensured that they received a good education.

== Plantations and other property ==
=== Settling debts and financial strategy ===
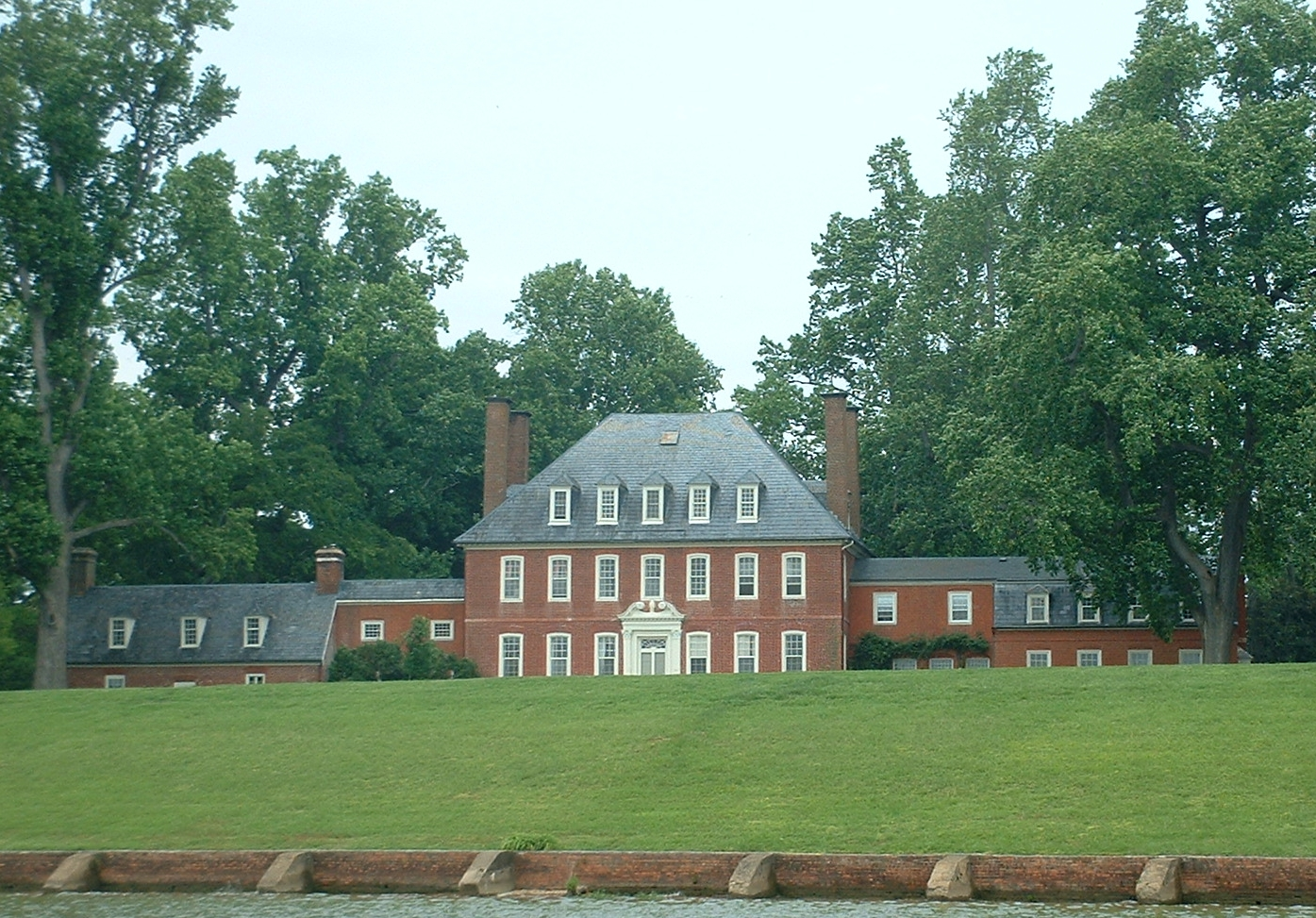
Westover Plantation, Charles City County, Virginia

Byrd managed his plantations, including Westover Plantation, in Charles City County, and Buckland in order to satisfy his creditors and still preserve some property for their ten children to inherit. She sold off some western lands, residences in Richmond and Williamsburg, and other property, but she was able to retain control of Westover, the major Byrd plantation in Charles City County.

=== American Revolution ===
Although Byrd had many ties to the British and Loyalists during the American Revolutionary War, she tried to remain neutral. Brigadier-General Benedict Arnold, the husband of her first cousin, Margaret "Peggy" Shippen Arnold, led a British force to Westover in early January 1781. From there, Arnold planned for his attack on Richmond, up the James River, 25 miles (40 km) north of Westover. He recruited local Tories for intelligence or to engage in the fight. At that time, Byrd family members served the British and American forces. Lender and Martin portray Arnold as a man who used charm to entice Americans to be loyal to the King and that Byrd was a "genial hostess" who "maintained a cordial correspondence" with Byrd after he left the estate. He took 800 troops to Richmond on January 4, 1781 and left a "holding force" at Westover".

Byrd was kept in the upper floors of the residence and hid in a secret room on the third floor. At that time, Arnold's soldiers read her private papers and ransacked the house. Arnold's men are said to have destroyed her crops, plant nursery, and fences along with killing several of her cows. His men seized three horses, 49 enslaved people, and two ferryboats. Arnold returned to Westover on or shortly after January 8. Two days later, his troops destroyed property from the interior of Benjamin Harrison V's mansion and took or killed livestock at Berkeley Plantation; about 40 enslaved people left with his troops.

After trying to recover property that had been seized by Arnold's forces, she was charged in 1781 by the state of Virginia with trading with the enemy. Byrd defended herself eloquently in a letter to Governor Thomas Jefferson: "I wish well to all mankind, to America in particular. What am I but an American? All my friends and connexions are in America; my whole property is here—could I wish ill to everything I have an interest in?" Her trial was first postponed and ultimately never held. The plantation was overrun by British forces led by Arnold and Lord Cornwallis and American forces three times during the war.

=== After the war ===
After the war, Byrd improved Westover Plantation to its previous state. François-Jean de Chastellux visited Westover Plantation in 1782 and stated that it "surpasses them all in the magnificence of the buildings, the beauty of its situation, and the pleasures of society." She also ran a residence on the James River with a number of enslaved servants. Byrd operated smaller successful plantations.

== Later years, death, and legacy ==
Byrd died on March 28, 1814 and was to be buried at the old Westover Church cemetery, next to her husband. Westover Plantation was sold in 1814 after her death.

In 2007, Byrd was posthumously honored by the Library of Virginia's "Virginia Women in History" program.

== Bibliography ==
- Lender, Mark Edward; Martin, James Kirby (2017). "A Traitor's Epiphany: Benedict Arnold in Virginia and His Quest for Reconciliation". The Virginia Magazine of History and Biography. 125 (4): 314–357. ISSN 0042-6636.
- "The Will of Mrs. Mary Willing Byrd, of Westover, 1813, with a List of the Westover Portraits". The Virginia Magazine of History and Biography. 6 (4): 346–358. April 1, 1899. JSTOR 4242183.
- "Will of Colonel William Byrd, 3d". The Virginia Magazine of History and Biography. 9 (1): 80–88. 1901. ISSN 0042-6636.
