= William Byrd III =

American planter, politician and military officer (1728–1777)

Colonel William Byrd III
- Portrait, c. 1747–1750
- Born: September 6, 1728; Charles City, Virginia
- Died: January 1/2, 1777 (aged 48); Charles City, Virginia
- Resting place: Westover Church
- Education: Middle Temple
- Occupations: Planter; politician; military officer
- Spouse(s): Elizabeth Hill Carter (m. 1748; died 1760) Mary Willing
- Children: 15
- Parent(s): William Byrd II; Maria Taylor Byrd
- Military career
- Allegiance: Virginia
- Branch: Virginia Provincial Forces
- Rank: Colonel
- Unit: Second Virginia Regiment
- Conflicts: French and Indian War

Colonel William Byrd III (September 6, 1728 – January 1/2, 1777) was an American planter, politician and military officer who was a member of the House of Burgesses.

== Life ==
He was son of William Byrd II and Maria Taylor Byrd, and the grandson of William Byrd I. Byrd inherited his family's estate of approximately 179,000 acres of land in Virginia and continued their tradition of serving as a member of the Virginia House of Burgesses. He chose to fight in the French and Indian War rather than spend much time in Richmond. In 1756 he was colonel of the Second Virginia Regiment.

At age 18, Byrd was sent to London to study law. There, he began to build a reputation as a notorious gambler. In 1752, he imported a chestnut horse from England, Tryall. That year, he initiated what was said to have been the first major horse race in the New World, involving fellow Virginia planters John Tayloe II, Francis Thornton, and Samuel Ogle & Benjamin Tasker Jr. of Maryland. Byrd offered 500 Spanish pistoles for any horse in the land to race Tryall, with the winner taking the lot. Tryall lost to Tasker's mare Selima, who would go on to become one of the foundation mares of American thoroughbreds.

By 1755, Byrd was in a dire financial situation. After he squandered the Byrd fortune on building a magnificent mansion at Westover Plantation, gambling, and bad investments, Byrd parceled up much of the land he had inherited from his father and sold it off to raise money to pay his debts. He also sold the enslaved African laborers who had worked on his estate plantation. Despite his debts, Byrd continued horseracing. In 1766, his horse Valiant Tryall, would lose to Tayloe's horse Hero.

Although his sale of property in assets of land, and enslaved, generated a huge sum, it still was not enough to pay off his creditors. Later, Byrd resorted to a lottery, the prizes of which would come from his estate, Belvidere, at the falls of the James River. However the lottery failed to generate sufficient revenue. Byrd was unable to retire his debts. Despondent and nearly broke, Byrd killed himself on January 1 or 2, 1777. He was buried in the cemetery at the old Westover Church.

== Marriage and family ==
Byrd's coat of arms

In 1748, Byrd married Elizabeth Hill Carter, daughter of Robert Carter I, who had recently died. An excellent political match, as her father had been the colony's richest man, gaining his wealth as a prominent plantation owner, and enslaver. He served in the House of Burgesses and then the colony's Governor's Council (eventually becoming its president by seniority). Together they had five children, 4 sons and 1 daughter.

- John Carter Byrd Sr.
- Thomas Taylor Byrd
- Elizabeth Hill Byrd Skipwith
- Francis Otway Byrd

In 1756, Byrd left his wife, sent his younger children to England and volunteered for military service.

Elizabeth Carter died on July 25, 1760 when she was 28 years old in a probable suicide.

Portrait of Mary Willing by Matthew Pratt, c. 1773

Byrd remarried, and fathered ten more children with his second wife, Mary Willing, daughter of Charles Willing of Philadelphia.

The 10 children of his second marriage (to Mary Willing) were:

- Maria Horsmanden Byrd
- Evelyn Taylor Byrd
- Charles Willing Byrd (died as child)
- Abby Byrd
- Anne Willing Byrd
- William Boyd Byrd
- Charles Willing Byrd
- Dorothy Byrd (died as child)
- Jane Byrd
- Richard Willing Byrd
