= The History of the Dividing Line =

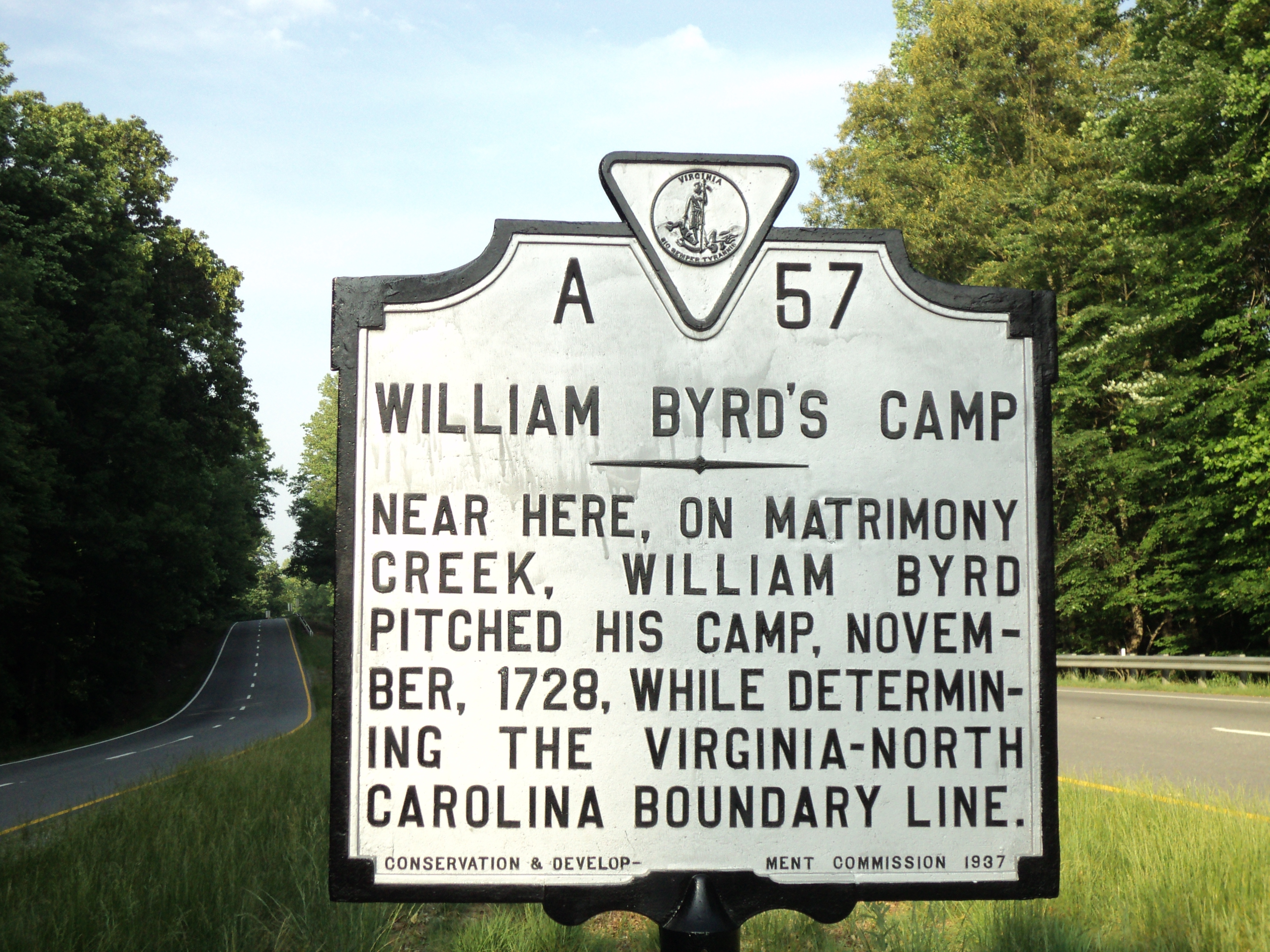
Marker noting the passing of William Byrd II and company surveying the Dividing Line, 1728, Henry County, Virginia

The History of the Dividing Line Betwixt Virginia and North Carolina is an account by William Byrd II of the surveying of the border between the Colony of Virginia and the Province of North Carolina in 1728. Byrd's account of the journey to survey the contentious border with his chief surveyor William Mayo included such nuggets as the derivation of the name of "Matrimony Creek," so named because of its 'brawling' waters.

Each of the two colonies provided surveyors and technicians to the team. William Byrd was the chief representative from Virginia, and Edward Moseley was the chief representative from North Carolina. Byrd also compiled what he called a Secret History of the project.

== In popular culture ==
William Byrd II's text was the focus of David Gatten's film project, also titled The Secret History of the Dividing Line.
