= William Byrd II =

American planter (1674–1744)

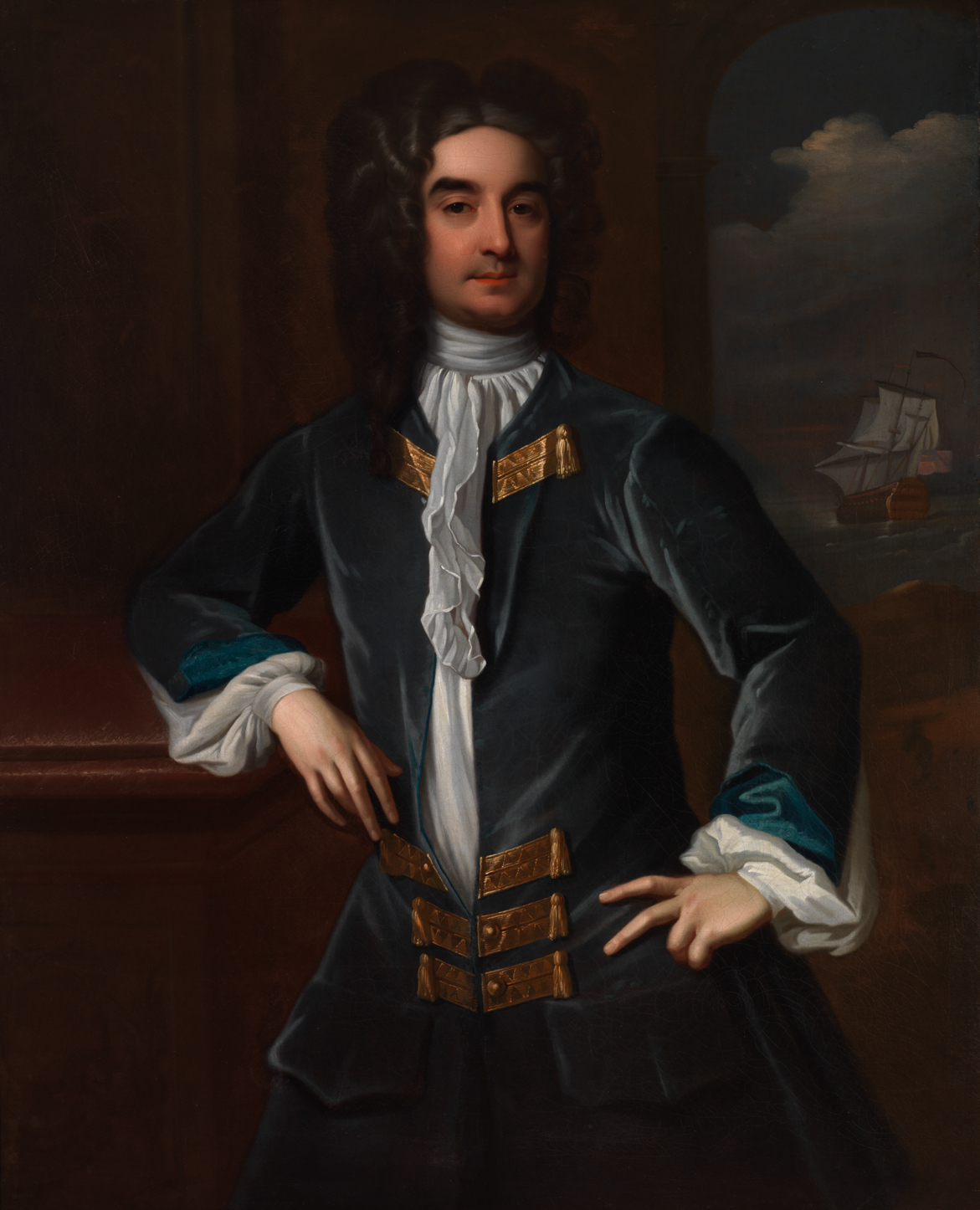
- Portrait by Hans Hysing, c. 1720–1726
- Born: March 28, 1674; Henrico County, Virginia, British America
- Died: August 26, 1744 (aged 70); Charles City County, Virginia, British America
- Resting place: Westover Plantation
- Education: Felsted School; Middle Temple
- Occupations: Planter, lawyer, surveyor and writer
- Known for: Founding Richmond, Virginia
- Title: Colonel
- Spouses: Lucy Parke (m. 1706; died 1715); Maria Taylor Byrd (m. 1724)
- Children: 7, including William Byrd III
- Father: William Byrd I

William Byrd II (March 28, 1674 – August 26, 1744) was an American planter, enslaver, lawyer, surveyor, and writer. Born in the English colony of Virginia, Byrd was educated in London, where he practiced law. Upon his father's death, Byrd returned to Virginia in 1705. He served as a member of the Virginia Governor's Council from 1709 to 1744. Byrd was also the House of Burgesses's colonial agent in London during the 1720s. His life reflected aspects of both the British colonial gentry and an emerging American identity.

Byrd led surveying expeditions of the border of Virginia and North Carolina. He is considered the founder of Richmond, Virginia. Byrd expanded his plantation holdings of enslaved people and commanded county militias during his life. His enterprises included promoting Swiss settlement in mountainous southwest Virginia and iron mining ventures in Germanna and Fredericksburg. A member of the Royal Society, Byrd was an early advocate of variolation to counter smallpox.

He may be known best for writing his diary and narratives of his surveying, of which some excerpts have been published in American literature textbooks. Byrd recorded his exploits, which are notable for its openness on issues such as sex and Byrd's brutal treatment of his slaves.

== Early life and education ==
Portrait as a child, c. 1678–1681

William Byrd, the eldest child of Mary Horsmanden Filmer Byrd and her second husband, William Byrd I, was born on March 28, 1674, in Henrico County, Virginia. (Note: He is referred to as William Byrd II to distinguish him from his father and his son, who were also named William.) His father was a planter, public official, and a Native American trader. When he was two, his mother took him with her to visit relatives in Purleigh, England. He was in England and living with his mother's relatives in 1681, when he was enrolled in Felsted School, where he studied Hebrew, Italian, and French. It was his father's goal that Byrd was educated to become a gentleman and had first-hand experiences with aristocrat.

He was an apprentice in London and Rotterdam for two years for tobacco trading companies, where he learned about commerce. During that time, he acquired the social graces of a gentleman. He then studied law at Middle Temple from 1692 to 1695, when he was admitted to the bar to practice law. The following year he was elected as a Fellow in the Royal Society with the support of Sir Robert Southwell, his father's friend. By this time, Byrd spent much of his childhood in England, but born in Virginia, where he was expected to return, he was not accepted as an Englishman. This made it difficult for him to marry into an aristocratic family or become a politician in England.

== Career ==
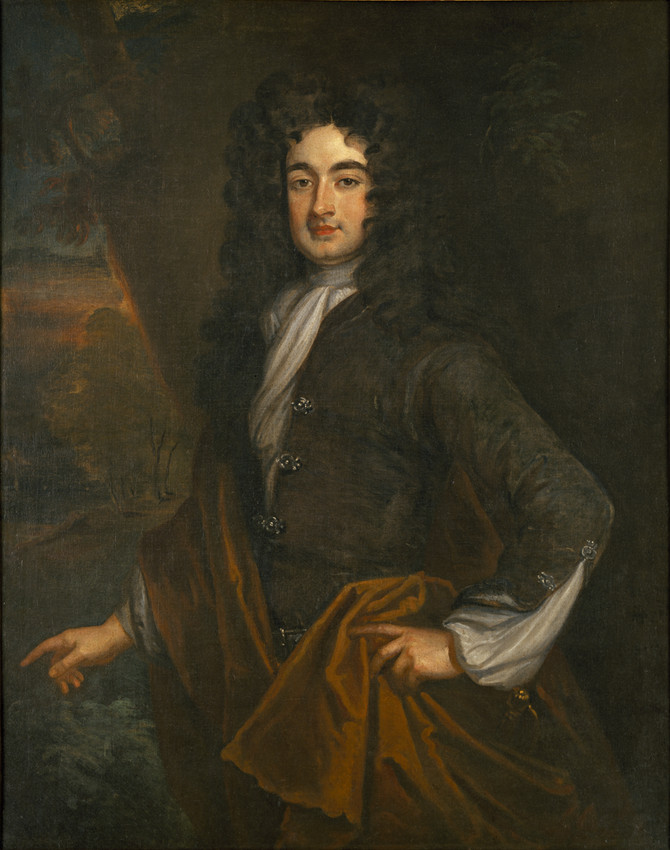
Portrait by Godfrey Kneller, c. 1700–1704

After a 15-year absence, he returned to Virginia in the summer of 1696. Due to his education and his father's influence, he was elected to the House of Burgesses in the fall of that year, but he withdrew in October to return to London, where he practiced law. He was admitted to Lincoln's Inn October 1697 and soon after defended Governor Sir Edmund Andros in a hearing at Lambeth Palace that unseated Andros for impeding the establishment of the College of William & Mary and replaced him with Francis Nicholson as Governor of Virginia. He became the London agent for the Virginia Governor's Council in 1698. His father held the combined offices of auditor- and receiver-general, which Nicholson had attempted to separate. In this position, Byrd was able to thwart Nicholson's efforts. In 1702, he attempted to have Nicholson removed from office, but the petition was rejected by the Crown and Byrd lost his position on the council.

In 1701, he went on a 14-week tour of England with Sir John Perceval, who was the nephew of Sir Robert Southwell. Byrd was 26 and Perceval was 18. By this time Byrd had a number of aristocratic friends and knew a lot about England. He introduced the teen to gentlemen, clergymen, borough officials, and merchants. Byrd was interested in the commerce, art collections, libraries and architecture of the places that they visited. During his time in England, he was a social man who focused on developing wordsmanship and polite manners. His father died in 1705 and Byrd returned to Virginia. He was the primary heir to his father's fortune, making him one of the wealthiest men in the colony. He became the receiver general; the post was separated from the auditorship following his father's death. On September 12, 1709, nearly four years after he applied, he was appointed to a seat on the Virginia Governor's Council, a position he held until his death.

Lieutenant Governor Alexander Spotswood reorganized the collection of quitrents in order to enlarge the royal revenue. Byrd felt that he was responsible for the operations of the receiver's office and had objected to Spotwood's actions and saw it as a personal affront. Byrd sailed for England in March or April 1715 at least in part to have Spotswood removed from office. Soon after, his wife joined him in England and died of smallpox. Within two months, he began to look for women to court. While in England, he sold the receiver generalship for £500 to a Virginian. Spotswood sought approval for the Tobacco Inspection Act of 1713—which regulated the quality and sale of tobacco exports—and the Indian Trade Act of 1714—which established a monopoly over commerce with Native Americans. Both were passed by the Virginia General Assembly, but it received a royal veto, which Byrd considered a personal win.

Byrd was appointed a London agent in May 1718. Spotswood had Byrd deposed from the council. Byrd promised to seek a reconciliation with Spotswood and to return to Virginia, which he did in February 1720 and reconciled with Spotswood. In 1721, he was appointed a paid agent for the House of Burgesses and returned to England. In 1726, he returned to Virginia. On April 28 of that year, he resumed attendance at the council. In 1728, he was appointed to survey the Virginia and North Carolina border by the next Lieutenant Governor Sir William Gooch. The Tobacco Inspection Act of 1730 was passed and Byrd's land was chosen for construction of a warehouse, of direct benefit to him. He is responsible for the establishment of the cities of Petersburg and, on his own land, Richmond, Virginia in 1733. Gooch appointed Byrd to a commission with commissioners and surveyors to lay out the Northern Neck Proprietary. Byrd wrote the report that was sent with the survey in August 1737 to England, but after his death a report from another commission was chosen. He was the senior councillor by 1743.

== Marriages ==
=== Lucy Parke Byrd ===
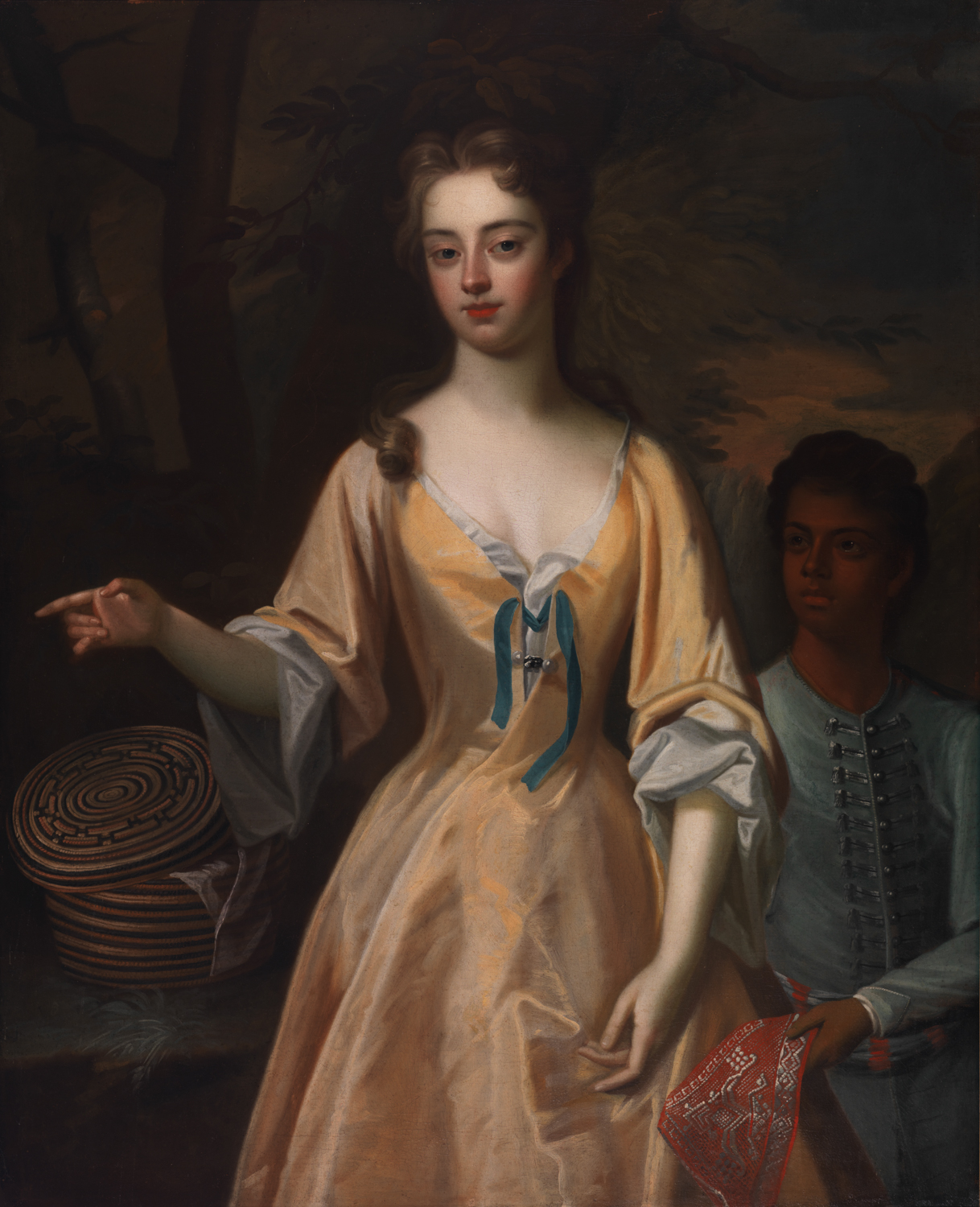
Lucy Parke Byrd, Byrd II's first wife

Byrd courted Lucy Parke, daughter of Jane Ludwell Parke and Daniel Parke (1664–1710), who was Governor of the Leeward Islands. Lucy lived near Colonial Williamsburg at the Parke's Queen's Creek plantation in York County, Virginia with her mother and her sister Frances. Her father, who lived with his mistress, forbade the women from entertaining male callers and did not provide the money for them to have clothes of their station. This made it difficult for Frances and Lucy to have suitors. Byrd, though, knew Parke and his aristocratic connections, and was favorably impressed with Parke's daughters, particularly Lucy. Byrd married Lucy on May 4, 1706, at the Queen's Creek plantation. Frances was married on the same day to John Custis (1678–after 14 November 1749).

At the time of their marriage, Lucy Parke was 18 years old, and her mother was concerned that Daniel Parke's many romantic affairs and reputation for stinginess were hurting his daughter's marriage prospects. When Byrd wrote a letter to the Parkes asking to court Lucy, they immediately accepted. Byrd wooed her with passionate letters proclaiming his love. He was promised a £1,000 dowry when he married Lucy, but rather than delivering it upon their marriage, he was bequeathed the amount at Parke's death. Byrd assumed debts of the Parke estate, which was a financial burden throughout the rest of his life. In exchange for accepting the debts, he took over lands that had been left to his wife's sister.

Byrd and Lucy Parke Byrd quarreled frequently. Byrd sometimes noted that after these arguments, they made up and he "rogered her" or "gave her a flourish." Their arguments often involved their slaves. Byrd notes in his diary entry for July 15, 1710 that Parke, "against my will caused little Jenny to be burned with a hot iron, for which I quarreled with her". Based on his diary, Byrd was singularly focused on treating his wife as a subordinate and did not foment closeness with their children. He often left his family for long periods of time. Their children were Evelyn Byrd, for whom Evelynton Plantation was named, and Wilhelmina Byrd, who married Thomas Chamberlayne.

Despite the couple's differences, aspects of their relationship appear tender and romantic. Following Byrd to London, she died of smallpox in 1716. Byrd suffered greatly, blaming himself for her death. He wrote of the "insupportable pain in her head… the smallpox… we thought it best to tell her the danger. She received the news without the least fright, and was persuaded she would live… Gracious God what pains did she take to make a voyage hither to seek a grave."

=== Maria Taylor Byrd ===
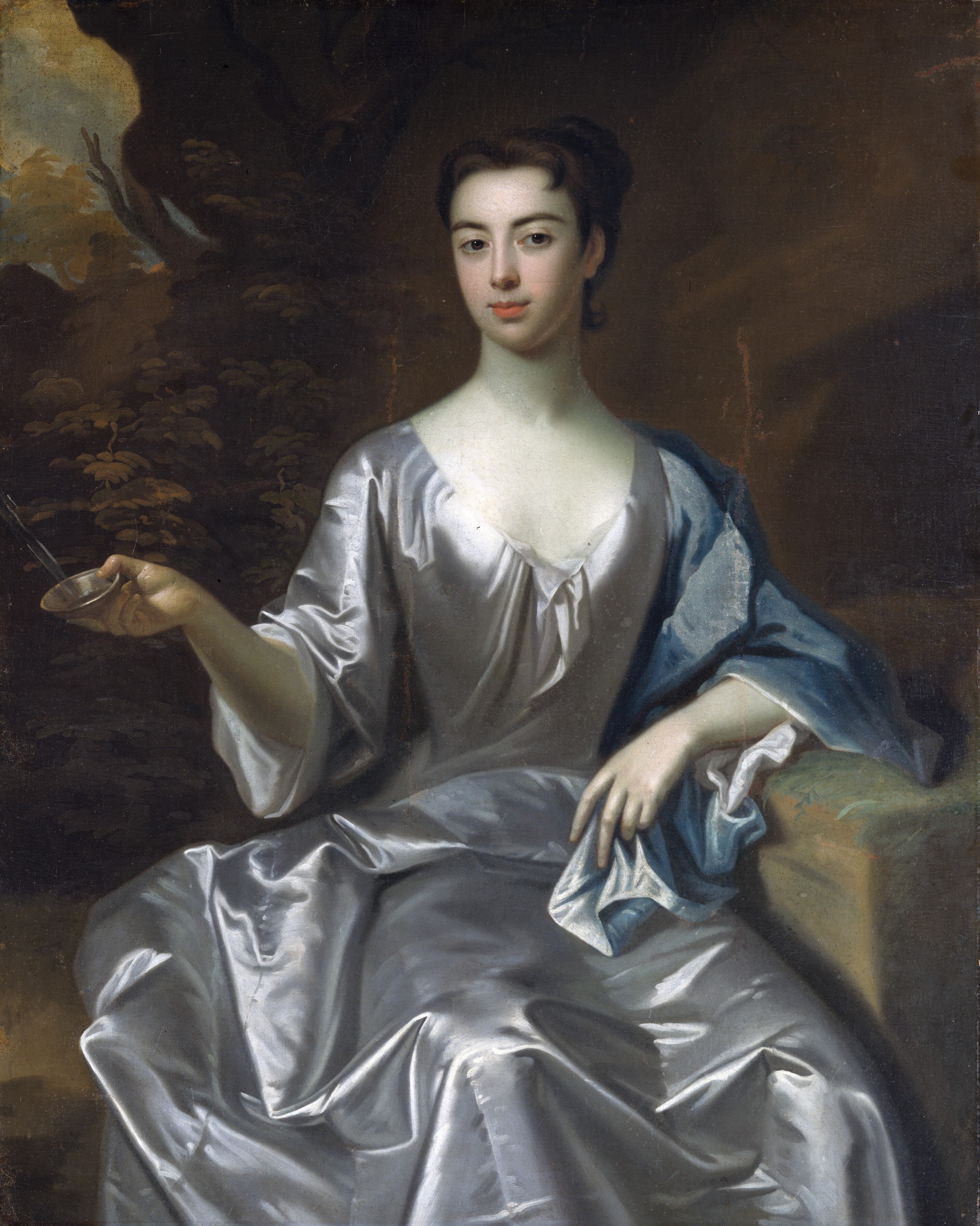
Maria Taylor Byrd, William Byrd's second wife

Byrd married Maria Taylor, the daughter of a Kensington gentleman, on May 9, 1724. She was 25 years of age and Byrd was 50. Taylor, an heiress of a wealthy family from Kensington, was a different character than Parke. Her rare appearance in Byrd's diary has left some historians with the image of a more submissive wife, accepting Byrd's authority over the household. She was certainly well-mannered, and epitomised the upper-class lady that he desired, without any record of passionate "flourishes" to quell arguments or threatening the servants. Despite Byrd's renewed sexual advances on other women, Taylor kept the household in good order.

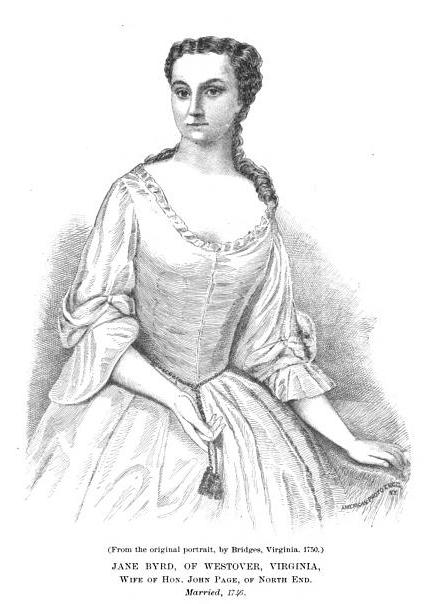
Jane Byrd, daughter of William Byrd II and Maria Taylor Byrd, later the wife of Hon. John Page of North End, Gloucester County, Virginia, 1750

Their children were Anne Carter, Maria Taylor Carter, Colonel William Byrd III, and Jane Page. Taylor appears to have tactically bided her time as Byrd aged, controlling the education of their children together and preparing to take control of Westover in her widowhood. She outlived Byrd by 37 years, supported by an annual pension in Byrd's will for £200 on the condition that she remain unmarried and living in Westover.

== Personal diaries ==
The first diary runs from 1709 to 1712 and was first published in the 1940s. It was originally written in a shorthand code and deals mostly with the day-to-day aspects of Byrd's life, many of the entries containing the same formulaic phrases. A typical entry read like this:

[October] 6. I rose at 6 o'clock and said my prayers and ate milk for breakfast. Then I proceeded to Williamsburg, where I found all well. I went to the capitol where I sent for the wench to clean my room and when I came I kissed her and felt her, for which God forgive me ... About 10 o'clock I went to my lodgings. I had good health but wicked thoughts, God forgive me.

In addition to the passages recounting his many infidelities, the diary also contains a record of the lives of slaves held by Byrd and his subsequent punishment. Byrd often beat the slaves he held and sometimes devised other punishments even more cruel and unusual:

September 3, 1709: I ate roast chicken for dinner. In the afternoon I beat Jenny for throwing water on the couch.

December 1, 1709: Eugene was whipped again for pissing in bed and Jenny for concealing it.

December 3, 1709: Eugene pissed abed again for which I made him drink a pint of piss.

== Literary pursuits ==
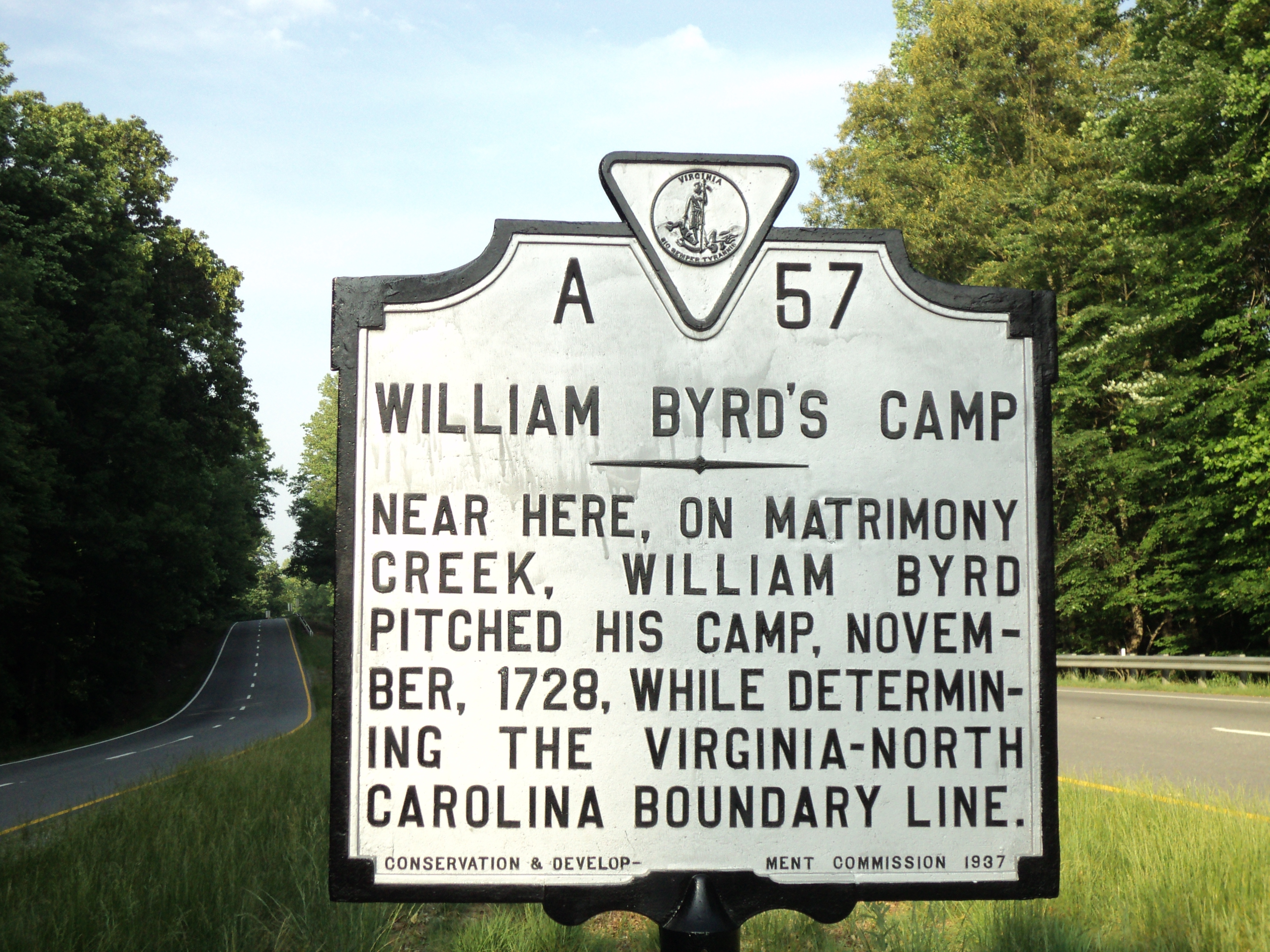
Historic marker for William Byrd's Camp on his expedition to survey the Dividing Line, Henry County, Virginia, 1728

While William Byrd was an avid planter, politician, and statesman, he was also a man of letters. He collected books written in English, French, Italian, Dutch, Hebrew, Greek, and Latin on a wide range of subjects. Considered one of the greatest colonial libraries, he had 3,500 volumes, including biography, history, architecture, science, divinity and law. He also had books about gardening, art, medicine, drama, and etiquette.

A prolific writer, Byrd wrote essays, histories, and speeches. He also wrote caricatures, poetry, and diaries. He corresponded with noted naturalists, statesmen, and writers of the time. All but two of his early literary works remained in manuscript form after his death at Westover in 1744, only appearing in print in the early 19th century and later receiving "dismissive commentary" by literary critics. It was not until the last quarter of the 20th century that his writings were assessed with any critical enthusiasm.

The History of the Dividing Line is Byrd's most influential piece of literary work and is now featured regularly in textbooks of American Colonial literature. Through The Secret History, the societal stereotypes and attitudes of the time are revealed. According to Pierre Marambaud, Byrd "had first prepared a narrative, The Secret History of the Line, which under fictitious names described the persons of the surveying expedition and the incidents that had befallen them."

=== Major works ===
Many of his works were in manuscript form and published after his death. His major works include:

- A Discourse Concerning the Plague (1721)
- The Westover Manuscripts: Containing the History of the Dividing Line Betwixt Virginia and North Carolina; A Journey to the Land of Eden, A.D. 1733; and A Progress to the Mines; Written from 1728 to 1736, and Now First Published (1841)
- The Secret Diary of William Byrd of Westover, 1709–1712 (1941)
- Another Secret Diary of William Byrd of Westover, 1739–1741, with Letters & Literary Exercises, 1696 (1942)
- The London Diary, 1717–1728 and other Writings (1958)
- The Prose Works of William Byrd of Westover: Narratives of a Colonial Virginian (1966)
- The Commonplace Book of William Byrd II of Westover (2001)

== Death ==
William Byrd II died on August 26, 1744, and was buried at Westover Plantation in Charles City County.

== Sources ==
- Berland, Kevin Joel, ed. (2013). The Dividing Line Histories of William Byrd II of Westover. UNC Press Books. ISBN 978-1-4696-0693-4.
- Byrd, William II (2009). "The History of the Dividing Line Betwixt Virginia and North Carolina; The Secret History of the Line". In Paul Lauter; Richard Yarborough; John Alberti; Mary Pat Brady; Jackson Bryer (eds.). The Heath Anthology of American Literature: Volume A : Beginnings to 1800 (6 ed.). Boston: Houghton Mifflin Harcourt Company. pp. 636–54. ISBN 978-0-618-89799-5.
- Lockridge, Kenneth A. (1987). The Diary, and Life of William Byrd II of Virginia, 1674-1744. London: W. W. Norton & Co. ISBN 9780393956825.
- Luthern, Allison (2012). "The Truth of it Is, She Has Her Reasons for Procreating So Fast": Maria Taylor Byrd's Challenges to Patriarchy in Eighteenth-century Virginia (Doctoral dissertation) (PDF) (Thesis). Appalachian state University. Published UNCG
- Marambaud, Pierre (April 1970). "William Byrd of Westover: Cavalier, Diarist, and Chronicler". The Virginia Magazine of History and Biography. 78 (2). Virginia Historical Society: 144–183. JSTOR 4247559.
- Marambaud, Pierre (1971). William Byrd of Westover, 1674-1744. University Press of Virginia. ISBN 978-0-8139-0346-0.
- Treckel, Paula A (Spring 1997). ""The Empire of My Heart": The Marriage of William Byrd II and Lucy Parke Byrd". The Virginia Magazine of History and Biography. 105 (2). Virginia Historical Society: 125–156. JSTOR 4249635.
- Wright, Louis B.; Tinling, Marion, eds. (1941). The Secret Diary of William Byrd of Westover, 1709-1712. Richmond, Va.
