= Tsenacommacah =

Country of the Native Americans of the Tidewater

Tsenacommacah Tsenacommacah (Powhatan)
- Time immemorial–present
- Status: Country
- Other languages: Powhatan, Pamunkey, Nansemond, Southern American English, Older Southern American English and High Tider
- Ethnic groups: Powhatan, Chickahominy, Nansemond, Pamunkey, Rappahannock, Nottoway, Americans and Mattaponi
- Religion: Native American religions, Christianity
- History
  - Established: Time immemorial–present
  - First Anglo-Powhatan War: 1610-1614
  - Second Anglo-Powhatan War: 1622-1626
  - Third Anglo-Powhatan War: 1644-1646
  - Bacon's Rebellion: 1676

Tsenacommacah (pronounced /ˌsɛnəˈkɒməkə/ SEN-ə-KOM-ə-kə in English; also written Tscenocomoco, Tsenacomoco, Tenakomakah, Attanoughkomouck, and Attan-Akamik) is the country of the various Native American peoples who inhabit the modern-day Tidewater region of Virginia. The region is carved by a series of large rivers, such as the Pamunkey, Chickahominy, Potomac, Rappahanock and Powhatan rivers, with large peninsulas nestled between them alongside extensive wetlands. The region today is part of the United States alongside six federally recognized Native American tribes: Chickahominy Indian Tribe, Chickahominy Indian Tribe–Eastern Division, Nansemond Indian Nation, Pamunkey Indian Tribe, Rappahannock Tribe and Upper Mattaponi Tribe.

== Name ==
Tsenacommacah is translated variously, including as “Land that was dwelt upon closely together” or “a nearby dwelling-place.” The word Tsenacommacah includes a word for a house.

== Geography ==
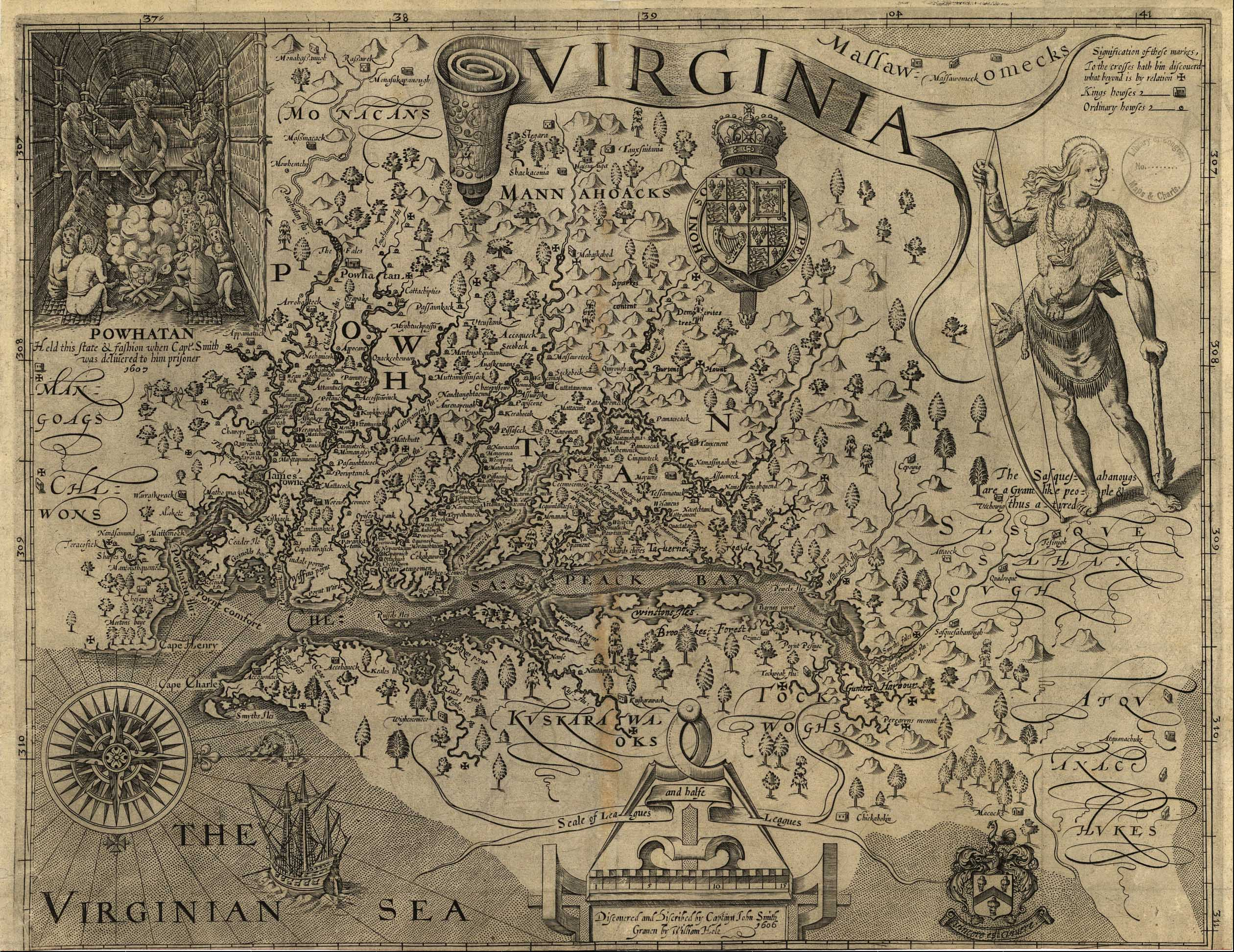
John Smith's map of the Chesapeake Bay and its tributaries. The map, c. 1612, details the location of numerous villages within Tsenacommacah. It is oriented with west at the top.

Tsenacommacah encompasses what is now also considered the Atlantic Plain and Tidewater of Virginia. It is centered on the Powhatan (James) and Pamunkey (York) rivers. It also includes the Potomac River, whose name is translated as meaning, "To bring again they go and come," a reference to trade in the region The rivers of Tsenacommacah are lined by extensive wetlands. Many of the Native placenames in the region are from the point of view of traveling by canoe as they often reference canoeing, fishing and gathering wetland plants. Tsenacommacah's northern bound is the Potomac River, the western boundary is the fall line and the eastern boundary is the Chesapeake Bay and Atlantic Ocean. Its southern extent includes the south shore of the James River, its mouth and a bit further along the coast, going as far inland as the Great Dismal Swamp.

The region has many animals, including poisonous snakes, squirrels, rabbits, opossums, raccoons, foxes, beavers, bears, wolves and lynx. The forests are predominantly oak, hickory, pine and chestnut trees. Tsenacommacah had their own kinds of dogs precontact, which are smaller than European dogs and have now gone extinct. The coastlines are filled with sturgeon, striped bass, menhaden, white perch, eels, crabs, oysters, mussels, shells and clams. The rivers are wide enough to allow dangerous wave action during thunder squalls so dangerous that it sometimes threatens container ships.

Picture of a recreation of a Chesapeake tribe canoe.

During his captivity, John Smith witnessed a ceremony that possibly described Tsenacommacah. His captors surrounded a fire with inner rings of cornmeal and outer rings of corn kernels. Smith viewed this as a largely geographic depiction of Tsenacommacah, seeing the corn kernels as the Chesapeake Bay shore, the fire as Werowocomoco and the sticks as him and his fellow settlers. Current scholars interpret the ritual as a way of placing Smith and the other settlers in the periphery of Tsenacommacah's kinship circles. Tsenacommacah's shape is also defined by its web of kinship relations throughout the country.

Tsenacommacah historically included many independent polities such as the Powhatan Confederacy, Chesapeake, Patawomeck and Chickahominy. The Tsenacommacans considered the English settlers, Tassantasses, roughly meaning strangers. Gallivan describes Tsenacommacah as heterarchical rather than a classical chiefdom as there was no single center of power instead, systems were flexible and adapted to circumstances with multiple power players.

== History ==
=== Early history ===
Tsenacommacah has its origins in the early fishing and gathering nations that had lived there for millennia, as evidenced by many of the region's place names evoking canoe travel, fishing and the harvest of wetland plants. Before 1000 BC, most settlements in Tsenacommacah were in high-elevation inland locations rather than along rivers. Varina pottery began being made in the region around 1200 BC. It was made using both S- and Z-twists and was tempered with sand and stone. Finishing involved the use of cord-marked or, less often, net-impressed surface treatments. Varina pottery involves a wide variety of distinct ceramic-making traditions and is far from a homogeneous block. According to archaeology, the Algonquian languages of the region may have arrived around the year 200, when a wave of newcomers mixed with locals.

Tsenacommacans cooking fish.

Mockley pottery began to be made around 200 AD and was tempered with crushed shells using S-twists exclusively. Mockley and Varina pottery were made by different communities, not the same group of people. The overlapping distribution of Mockley and Varina ceramics from 200 to 600 AD implies overlapping kinship networks between the different peoples of Tsenacommacah. During this period, Mockley ceramics are largely found in riverine villages, often with shell middens, while Varina ceramics are found in small settlements scattered throughout the country. Shell middens from places with Mockley ceramics often include clam shells, oyster shells, migratory fish and elaborate pottery likely used for feasting. Places where Varina pottery is more common were largely small and temporary communities, relying on deer and nuts for food. Sites associated with either Varina or Mockley ceramics also had distinct projectile points. The peoples of the region were specialized into fishers and foragers who likely gifted food back and forth across communities in accordance with their niche.

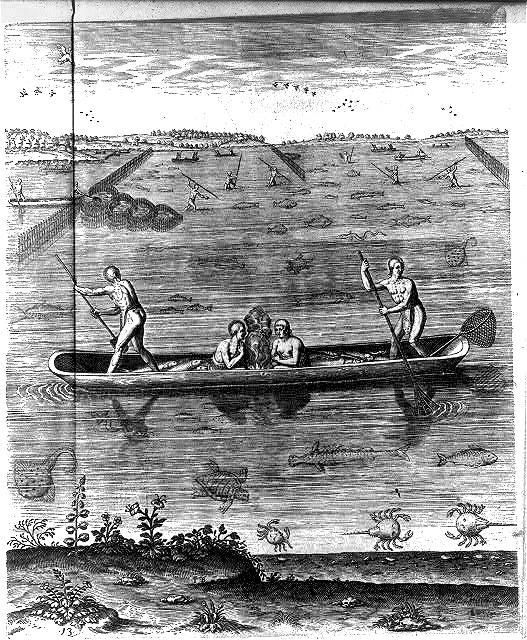
Artistic drawing of Tsenacommacans spear fishing in dugout canoes.

The end of the making of Varina pottery correlates with a local warm period and expanding wetlands. This same warm period correlates with a spike in shell consumption, which then fell with the introduction of agriculture around 1000 AD, only to slowly rise again up until contact. The sizes of the oysters fell with increased consumption and rose when consumption lessened. Abbott zone-decorated ceramics show up rarely in Tsenacommacah and were used for special occasions when different groups came together for feasting, gifting and ceremony. It is likely that Abbott zone-decorated ceramics and Mockley ceramics coincide with the arrivals of Algonquian-speaking peoples to Tsenacommacah and the broader East Coast.

The earliest known dates for maize agriculture are around 1100 AD, while beans show up later, around 1450 AD. Agricultural consumption was spiking in the decades before the founding of the English colonial settlement of Jamestown. Agricultural towns were usually placed on hills near rivers with strong tides and freshwater springs. Towns would have up to 100 houses, each with 2 to 20 residents. Houses (Yihakin) were built from frames of tree saplings with woven mats for the exterior, which were surrounded by agricultural fields and, further afield, large open clearings. Economic transactions were conducted in a gift economy. For example, in 1608, Wahunsenacawh refused to barter with the English, insisting their goods all be laid out in front of him so he could reciprocate their gifts. There may have been moieties or clans but evidence for or against is rare and hard to parse.

Drawing of a Weroance.

By contact with the English, Tsenacommacah had for centuries been governed by various independent Weroances who levied taxes, raised armies and inherited their political offices through the matriline. Political alliances and agreements were forged through the gifting of important goods such as deerskins, beads (especially the rare blue beads), copper, maize and pearls alongside marriages between prominent families. In these interactions, there were a variety of customary diplomatic procedures whenever a given weroancy hosted people from other polities. In domestic politics, shamans and priests (called Quioccosuks or Quiakros meaning 'the just' or 'the upright ones') were vital advisors and held veto power over decisions in council. The various nations of Tsenacommacah had Quicosin, which the English described as 'temples,' that were run by the Quiakros. The Quicosin held sacred items such as the bodies of deceased Weroances and were surrounded by palisades to protect the building from physical and spiritual threats. September through November were reserved for feasts and religious rituals conducted by the local Weroance and the Quiakros.

In 1570-1571, the Spanish Empire briefly established a Jesuit mission colony likely near the Kiskiack, which was attacked and destroyed by an army led by Paquinquineo. Various nations living in Tsenacommacah at the time includes the Powhatan, Chesapeake, Nansemond, Kecoughtan, Warraskoyack, Quiyoughcohannock, Paspahegh, Weyanoke, Appomattoc, Arrohattoc, Chickahominy, Pamunkey, Kiskiack, Mattaponi, Youghtanund, Lower Cuttatawomen, Moraughtachund, Rappahannock, Nantaughtacund, Upper Cuttatawomen, Wicocomico, Sekakawon, Onawmanient and Patawomeck. The Pamunkey hosted a sacred site on a hill near Uttamussak, with three Quicosin that could only be directly visited by Weroances. Ordinary Tsenacommacahs would leave offerings in the rivers to the local spirits.

=== Powhatan Confederacy ===
Drawing of Wahunsenacawh on John Smith's 1612 map

The Confederacy began with Wahunsenacawh's mother, from whom he inherited six tribes: Powhatan, Arrohattoc, Appomattoc, Pamunkey, Youghtanund, and Mattaponi. He governed much of Tsenacommacah through gifting, conquest and alliances. The Powhatan Confederacy at its peak had around 30 affiliated tribes. The Confederacy faced threats from the mountains and the piedmont, where Monacans, Massawomecks and Manahoacs raided the polities in the Atlantic plain. The Monacans specifically were an important middleman for the trade of copper coming from the Blue Ridge Mountains or the Great Lakes. The Meherrin, Nottoway and Tuscarora further south were friendly with the Powhatan Confederacy and traded extensively with them. In the north, the Patawomeck were allied with the nearby Piscataway Confederacy. Based on John Smith's estimates around 1610, Tsenacommacah had approximately 15,000 people.

In 1607, the English Empire built Jamestown in the heart of the Tsenacommacah and soon after built James Fort nearby. The initial English settlers at Jamestown described Tsenacommacah to the people in their home country in largely commercial terms. They depicted it as a land where one could live as a land-owning noble, hunting, fishing and riding horses as leisure. Colonists hoped to seize control of the local polities similarly to how the Spanish Empire had in Mesoamerica and the Andes by appropriating local power structures. Wahunsenacawh had John Smith kidnapped and brought to Werowocomoco. Wahunsenacawh asked why John Smith had come to his country. Smith lied, saying that he was fleeing the Spanish and bad weather, with his mission being to avenge one of the colonists who got killed by Monacans. Wahunsenacawh insisted he would provide for the colonists as long as he received coppers and hatchets in return. He also told them to settle closer to Werowocomoco. Smith also tells a dubious story where Pocahontas saved him from a threatened execution and two days later he was adopted as Wahunsenacawh's son.

Artistic drawing of a battle between English and Powhatan Confederacy forces.

In 1608, colonist Christopher Newport attempted to crown the Mamanatowick of the Powhatan Confederacy to induct him into the English legal system and make him subordinate to the English crown. The Mamanatowick, Wahunsenacawh (commonly known as Chief Powhatan), refused this gesture. Lauren Working argues Wahunsenacawh may have responded in turn by gifting the English a deerskin map showing their place within Tsenacommacah's legal order, likely visually similar to what's known as Powhatan's Mantle. In the earliest years of James Fort, archaeological evidence shows Tsenacommacan pottery, grinding stones, dogs, arrows and housing construction starting in James Fort, likely due to Tsenacommacan presence in the fort. Settlers also started adopting native houses as they were better able to withstand storms and heat.

By December 1608, Wahunsenacawh had grown suspicious of the colonists (Note: Gallivan 2016, page 170: "Wahunsenacawh raised his own doubts about the purpose of their settlement: Some doubt I have of your comming hither, that makes me not so kindly seek to relieve you as I would: for many doe informe me, your comming hither is not for trade, but to invade my people, and possesse my Country, who dare not come to bring you Corne, seeing you thus armed with your men. To free us of this feare, leave aboard your weapons, for here they are needlesse, we being all friends, and for ever Powhatans.") and implored towns to refuse to give the Jamestown colonists food. In retaliation, John Smith raided a Nansemond town, threatening them and stealing their food. In 1609, John Smith was summoned to Werowocomoco to meet Wahunsenacawh. Smith hoped to repeat his success against the Nansemond by kidnapping Wahunsenacawh at this meeting. Smith gave all the requested gifts except for any weapons for the meeting. When they finally met, Wahunsenacawh had the colonists put down their weapons because they were his subjects and reaffirmed that John Smith was one of the Weroances in his Confederacy.

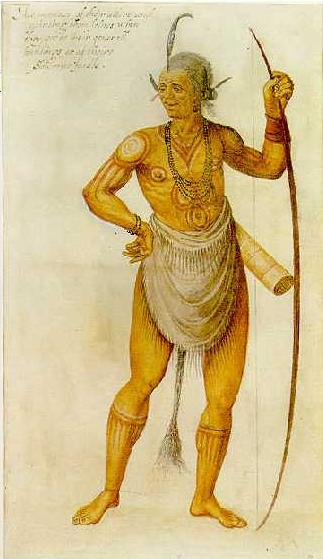
Drawing of a Weroance.

From 1606-1612, Tsenacommacah experienced a drought causing food scarcity. In 1609, local tribes continued to refuse to trade with the English. The colonists were increasingly attacking Powhatan towns and stealing their foodstuffs alongside other goods. Between November 1609 and May 1610, Jamestown was besieged by the Powhatan Confederacy and the colonists faced acute starvation. Eventually, a peace was reached due to a marriage between Pocahontas and colonist John Rolfe.

By the First General Assembly in early August 1619, a dispute between factions wanting the Virginia Colony organized on feudal or democratic grounds was won by the democratic faction and they would be the ones leading the colonization of Tsenacommacah. The assembly included discussion of the assimilation of the Indigenous inhabitants of Tsenacommacah, including construction of a school to assimilate Native Americans. However, the colonists feared that the Quiakros would prevent assimilation. To prevent this, the colonists pursued a campaign of destruction of graves, Quicosin and Quiakros. Mirroring the concerns of the assembly, settlers, starting in 1606, were repeatedly instructed to convert the natives to Christianity and to use them for food while never trusting them. Likewise, the 1609 charter instructs the settlers to procure the children away from the Quiakros. Settlers also hoped to tax the peoples of Tsenacommacah so heavily that "...the burden of tribute [would] force the Indians to fell the forest and become cashcrop farmers."

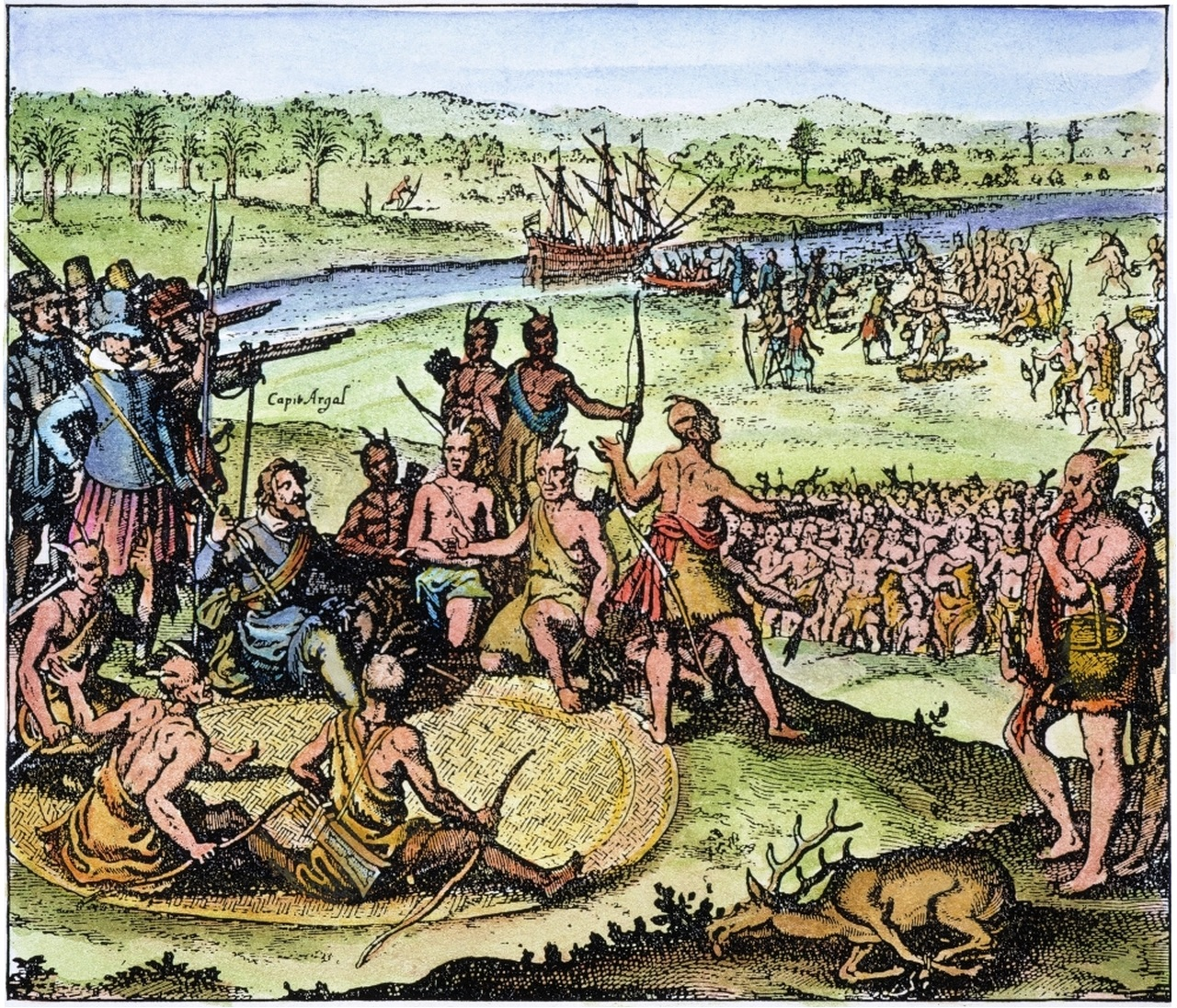
Artist representation of the meeting between Samuel Argall and the Chickahominy.

The assembly heard reports of soldiers stealing maize. During wartime, settlers would cause famines by razing agricultural fields and earn a profit from looting burial sites. Settlers even refused to use local smoking pipes, preferring imports from England to signal their loyalty to the English crown. The assembly struggled to set up clear boundaries and interactions between Indian territory and English territory.

From 1622 to 1624, a second war between the Powhatan Confederacy and the English Empire resulted in the defeat of the confederacy. After 1622, the Kiskiak settled new lands legally reserved for them. They were harassed by settlers regardless. In 1683, the colonists disestablished the Kiskiak's reservation entirely. In 1634, the English settlers palisaded the entire Virginia peninsula to keep natives out of their traditional territories. From 1644 to 1646, the Natives of Tsenacommacah led another war against the Colony of Virginia to punish them for their various transgressions and seize back ancestral lands.

=== Colonial period ===
As part of the Treaty of 1646, the power of Tsenacommacah was suppressed. The boundaries specified in the treaty rigidly separated Indian lands from those that were considered colonial territory, and restricted crossings to those on official business. Badges were required for all visitors. The treaty also established the payment of a yearly tribute to the English, as well as delineating several tribal land reservations. Extensive private tobacco plantations were spread throughout the land and African slaves began to flow to the colony as part of the triangle trade to fulfill the demands for labor. In 1700 alone, 6000 slaves were forced into the region. In the 1600s and 1700s, English colonists began cutting down the oak, hickory and pine forests of Tsenacommacah and planting Tobacco plantations. This led to widespread soil erosion and the spread of weedy plants.

Picture of a Chickahominy woman in the early 1900s.

Following Bacon's Rebellion, the Treaty of Middle Plantation was signed by many Virginia Indian chiefs in 1677, disempowering Tsenacommacah even further. The treaty set up six reservations, reinforced the annual tribute payment to the English, and more fully acknowledged the Virginia tribes' subjection to the King of England. Despite this, Tsenacommacans alongside neighboring tribes would ritually take their ancestors' remains from colonized places and move to their new settlements with them. They would also conduct burials and rituals at important places. Stones were tossed into rivers as offerings to local spirits. These activities continued well into the 1700s.

Rappahannock at a tribal celebration.

=== Contemporary tribes ===
All of the reservations, save two, were lost over the next two centuries. Even so, many of the remaining tribes still live in or near their ancestral lands. The Pamunkey and Mattaponi are the only tribes that still maintain their reservations from the 1600s. As such, these two tribes still make their yearly tribute payments of fish and game, as stipulated by the 1646 and 1677 treaties. As far as anyone knows, the tribes have not missed a "payment" in over 3 centuries. Every year, on the Wednesday before Thanksgiving, they go to the Virginia Governor's house in Richmond to make their yearly payment. A ceremony is held in which a deer, turkey, or fish and some pottery are presented to the governor. Before the ceremony, a brunch is held where the tribes can converse with the governor. It has not always been easy for the Mattaponi and the Pamunkey to get the necessary items for their yearly payment, but they have made it a point to uphold their end of the treaties.

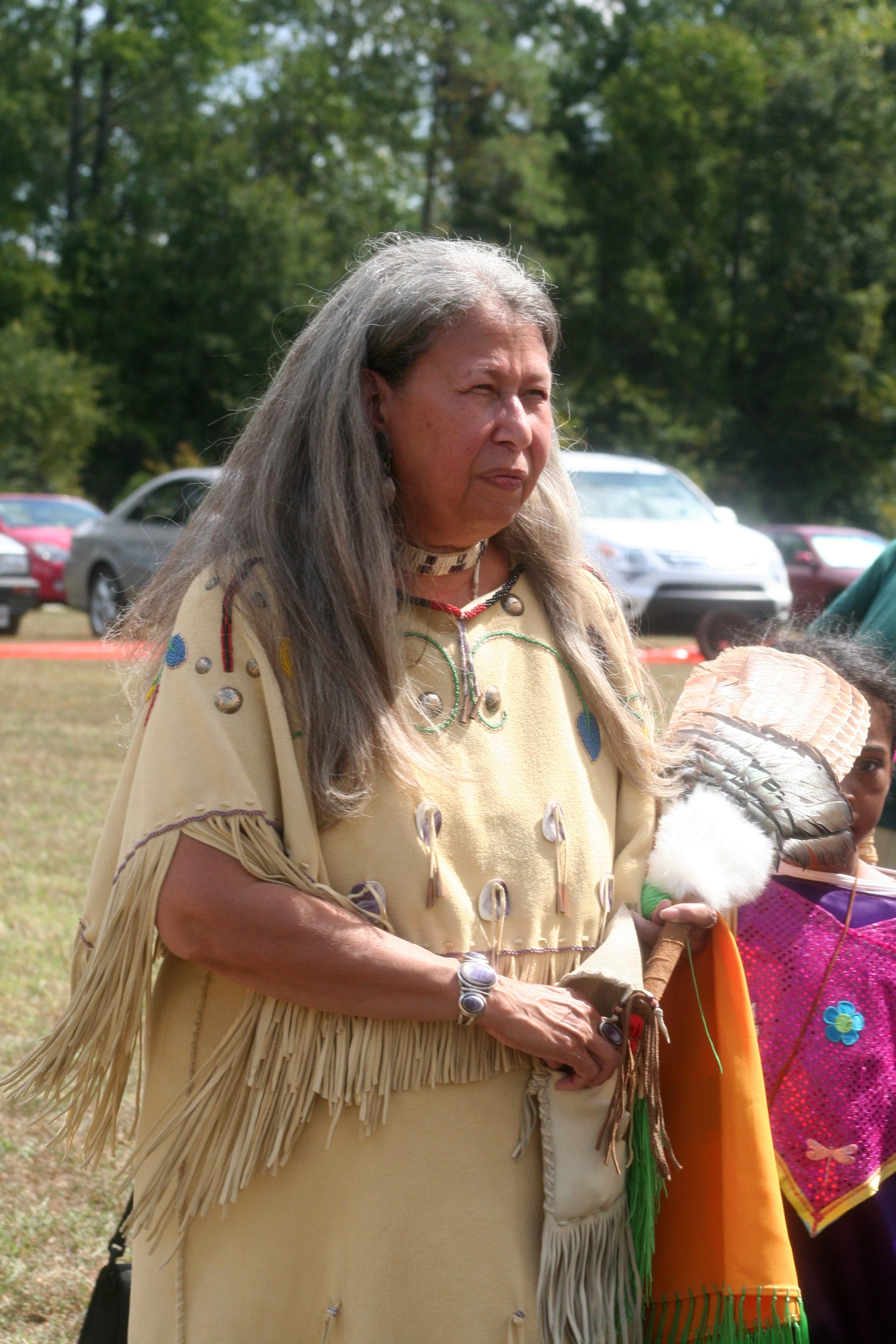
Picture of the chief of the neighboring Nottoway Indian Tribe.

Today, Tsenacommacah has well over 3 million people in total. In total seven Tsenacommacan tribes survived to the present: Pamunkey, Chickahominy, Eastern Chickahominy, Mattaponi, Upper Mattaponi, Rappahannock, and Nansemond tribes. Tribes work with local historians and archaeologists to protect cultural sites and artifacts while telling their histories. The local tribes also work to protect local ecosystems. For example, in the 2000s the Mattaponi and Pamunkey stopped the construction of a reservoir along the Mattaponi River. The dam would've flooded over 1,500 acres and destroyed more wetlands than any project since 1972. It also would've flooded at least 150 archaeological sites, many of which are sacred to the local Tsenacommacans. The location of the site for water intake was also in violation of the Treaty of Middle Plantation. The project was declined in 2003 but revived under pressure multiple times from the City of Newport News and the Governor of Virginia. However, in March 2009 the project was shut down for good.

== Culture ==
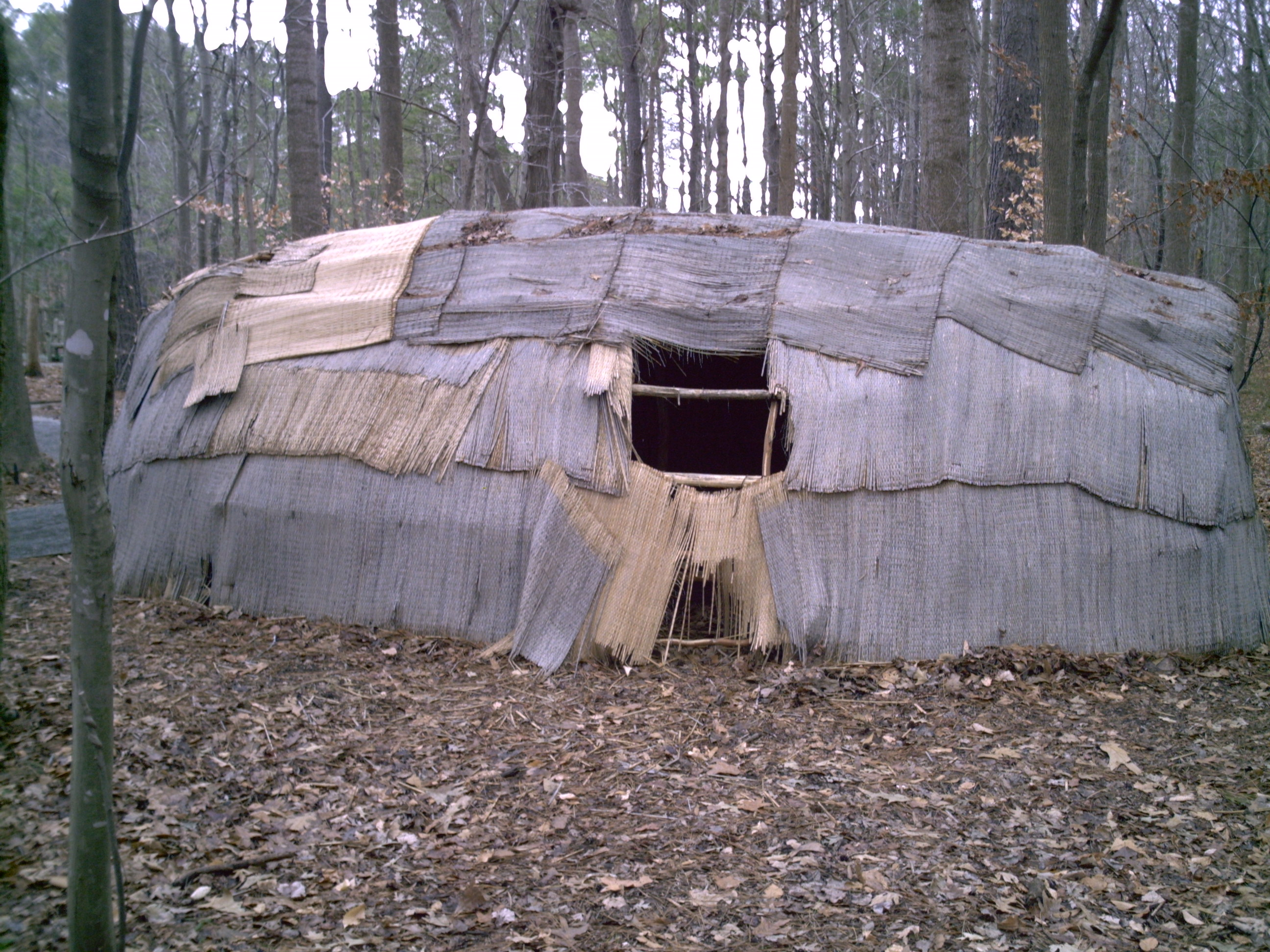
Reconstructed traditional Chesapeake tribe house

In Tsenacommacah, men are traditionally responsible for fishing, warfare and hunting animals such as deer and elk. Meanwhile, women raise children, cook, farm, make pottery, build hunting camps, weave baskets, make shell beads and mats. Although most material goods are made by women, stone, bone and wooden tools are made by men. Receiving arrows is considered a gift. Men make weirs called “neihsacan” to catch fish like the Shad and Sturgeon. Men who trade and fish by water in canoes are called “cheiksew.” Mussels and oysters also make an important part of their diet and they used to be smoked for year round comsumption. Other important foods include mulberries, strawberries, tortoises and crabs. Fires are lit to clear new lands, move animal populations and make gathering food easier. Alongside the four seasons, the Tsenacommacans split their years by the earing of corn (Nepinough) and their harvest (Taquitock).

Pamunkey chief chanting at naming ceremony.

Tsenacommacah is also agricultural and produces surplus food. Crops traditionally grown by women include beans, wheat, peas, tobacco, gourds and squash. Fields would be rotated regularly to avoid a single field being depleted. Roots, nuts and seeds are an important part of local diets and culture. They are a common inheritance from their ancestors that feeds, cares for and empowers the people of the region. Gathering these plants along the edges of shores and rivers is women's responsibility and they are holders of knowledge about these plants. Seeds are viewed as storing stories, folklore, dances and histories. The kind of tobacco grown in Tsenacommacah is Apook, which is a sacred plant. It is traditionally used in religious ceremonies and came from Mesoamerica a long time ago. Tobacco wasn't a cash crop. Instead, it was often given as gifts, grown in farms and used in ceremonies. The breadbaskets of Tsenacommacah are the swamps holding staples of local diets such as wild rice, tuckahoe and cow lily. The Powhatan economy overall depends completely on the work of both men and women.

Picture of a Chickahominy traditional dancer.

On what's known as Powhatan's mantle, it shows art of a human flanked on both sides by two nonhuman animals. Lauren Working argues this is reflective of the importance of relations with other-than-human people among the peoples of Tsenacommacah. Residents of Tsenacommacah value dogs as important animals and view them as companions. Dogs are used for hunting birds and deer, hauling goods and as a supply of food and materials such as clothing. Traditionally, they are often given their own burials, sometimes shared with humans. During the early Virginia colony, natives in the region thwarted the efforts of colonists to keep their dog breeds pure by seeking out European dogs with traits they viewed as desirable. The English even tried to outlaw interbreeding between English and Tsenacommacah dogs, as the English did not like that Native people didn't have "pure" dog breeds.

== Government ==
Traditionally, land is held in common. Although there are no attested adoption procedures in Tsenacommacah, it's likely the peoples of the region have such a practice.
