= Frontier Culture Museum =

Living history museum in Staunton, Virginia, United States

Coordinates: 38°7′28.5″N 79°2′58″W

Frontier Culture Museum of Virginia
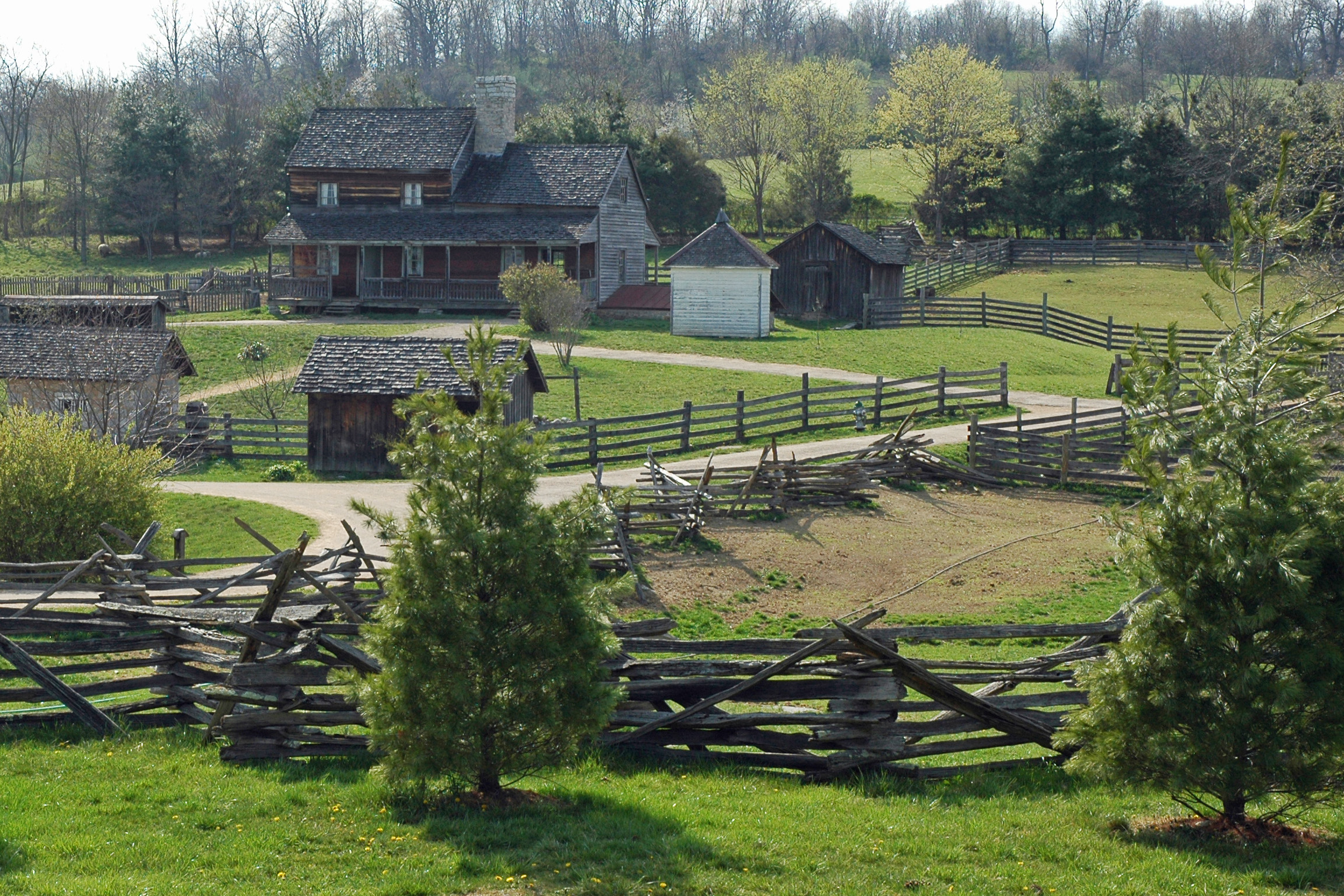

- Location within Shenandoah Valley Location within Virginia Location within the United States
- Former name: Museum of American Frontier Culture
- Established: July 1, 1986
- Location: Staunton, Virginia, United States
- Type: Living history
- Website: frontiermuseum.org

The Frontier Culture Museum of Virginia is the biggest open-air museum in the Shenandoah Valley. The museum operates on 188 acres (76 ha) of land in Staunton, Virginia, United States, which includes 1.8 miles (2.9 km) of paved walking trails. The museum features eleven exhibits, eight of which are working farms displaying the daily life of those who relocated to the Shenandoah Valley, either by choice or by force, from Europe and West Africa, as well as their descendants in the Shenandoah Valley.

== History and overview ==
While the conception of the museum was born through the activities of the American bicentennial in 1975, the General Assembly of Virginia did not establish the Museum of American Frontier Culture until July 1, 1986. The museum was officially opened to the public on September 9, 1988, with three permanent exhibits in place, the English Cattle Shed, the Irish Farmhouse, and the 1850s Farmhouse (then known as the American Farm Exhibit).

Over the next three decades, the Frontier Culture Museum of Virginia expanded to include an English farm, German farm, West African site, Irish forge, American Indian site, 1760s settlement house, 1820s farm, 1840s schoolhouse, and 1860s African American church. Today visitors can explore the different outdoor exhibits and see how traditions evolved and changed throughout time as different immigrant groups learned from one another and begin integrating customs. This can be seen through the architecture of the buildings, the food that was eaten, and the music that was played for entertainment.

During most of the year, the Frontier Culture Museum of Virginia has costumed interpreters in the farmhouse exhibits demonstrating the daily activities of the people who would have lived in the homes.

== West Africa ==
The West African site at the Frontier Culture Museum of Virginia demonstrates a single familial compound of an 18th-century Igbo family, which is situated in modern-day Nigeria. At present the exhibit is currently under renovation and temporary structures have been put in place for daily life programming. Traditionally the Igbo compound is rectangular in shape and enclosed by a strong wall, the compound at the Frontier Culture Museum encloses an Obi (the central building), houses for two of the wives, a house for the son, a pavilion, and a small kitchen area.

Around 40% of enslaved individuals who came to the Valley of Virginia were originally from the Igbo tribe. This percentage is the highest of any other ethnic group that was removed from their native homelands and brought to the American colonies in bondage. With them, enslaved individuals brought traditions and customs, items like the modern-day banjo are descended from musical instruments used in West Africa.

== England ==
The English farmhouse was relocated to the Frontier Culture Museum of Virginia in the 1990s. The timber-frame building was built by an English yeoman farmer in the 17th century. The interpretation of the English house focuses on the 1650s, when immigration from England to the colonies was near its height. The house was brought from county Worcestershire in the western region of England near the village of Hartlebury.

Yeoman famers owned their land, but did not receive enough, if any, income from renting it out to be considered part of the gentry. Oftentimes the eldest son would inherit the entirety of the land, leaving any younger sons to find alternative means of income. This would include the sons relocating to British Colonial America in search of lands of their own.

== Ireland ==
Northern Ireland during the mid-18th century saw a rise of immigration to the American colonies. The Irish house from County Tyrone in Ulster, Ireland, shows key aspects of daily life of the tenant farmer. The farmstead includes the rectangular house, a pig crawl, and the long byre.

The farmstead was designed to be primarily self-sufficient, with some goods coming in or going out based on the crops produced by the farm. The primary cash crop in Ireland during this period was flax, which would later be processed and woven into linen.

== Irish forge ==
The forge accompanies the Irish farmstead exhibit and came from County Fermanagh, also in Ulster, Ireland. Skilled laborers were sought after in the American colonies and were often given more favorable terms with their indentured servitude compared to their unskilled (and often younger) counterparts. Skills that were often sought after in the American colonies included those provided by blacksmiths, coopers, brick layers, gunsmiths, and carpenters.

== Germany ==
The German farm at the Frontier Culture Museum of Virginia tells the story of peasant farmers from the Palatinate region of modern-day Germany in the mid-18th century. As part of the Holy Roman Empire, many German peasants were tied to the land and the territorial ruler, making it expensive to leave the region. This is especially true for the people who chose to migrate to America in search of a better life due to overpopulation and land scarcity. Hopeful migrants would have to obtain permission from local authorities and pay a tax called a manumission fee in order to begin the journey to the American colonies.

The German farmhouse was brought from Hördt in southwestern Germany and is made with a timber frame with waddle and daub with a red clay tile roof. One of the most notable features of the German farm is the Stube, the stove room. In the corner of the Stube, a Kachelofen (heating stove) was constructed using bricks, covered over with daub and whitewashed. In lower income households, the Kachelofen would have minimal decoration, but wealthier households would often also cover the Kachelofen with decorative tiles. This innovation often required less wood than fireplaces and would hold heat for longer periods of time.

== American Indian ==
The American Indian exhibit at the Frontier Culture Museum of Virginia covers the time period from 1650s through the 1760s. While no single tribe is represented at the museum exhibit, there are several tribes and nations that would have inhabited the Eastern Woodlands area, which lays east of the Mississippi River. These included, but are not limited to, the Mattaponi Pamunkey, Chickahominy, Eastern Chickahominy, Rappahanock, Upper Mattaponi, Nansemond, Monacan, Cheroenaka, Nottaway, and Patawomeck.

The exhibit at the museum shows a small community with wigwams as the primary residence of the inhabitants, although other communities may have used longhouses. The exhibit also includes a cooking area, small shelters to watch the crop fields, and a canoe burning demonstration area.

== 1760s farm ==
The settlement site looks at the early settlement sites of the 18th century in the Shenandoah Valley. One-room log cabins, such as the one at the museum, were not meant to be permanent structures for early settlers. Many settlers in the American backcountry learned from the American Indians and incorporated their farming and hunting techniques, and in turn, they traded tools, household goods, and other iron made items. Life in the back country, however, was not always easy. Clearing the land and hostilities with some Indigenous groups could lead to challenges with severe consequences. For many people migrating to the backcountry, though, the risks were worth the economic and social rewards.

Log cabins were typically built of lumber that was notched on either end with daubing to insulate between the beams. Wooden shingles were placed on the room in an overlapping design to help keep rain and snow out. During the initial years in the backcountry, farmers would clear land for crops and plant for their own subsistence. Once the farm could sustain a family, the farmers would then begin growing surplus for market, and cash crops such as flax for linen and hemp for cordage or rope.

== 1820s farm ==
By the 1820s, the different peoples who settled the Valley of Virginia, the English, Irish, German, and enslaved individuals, had lived together for several generations. Alongside their American Indian counterparts, shared experiences began leading to a cross-cultural society. The 1820s exhibit at the Frontier Culture Museum of Virginia shows the evolving and blending cultures of the Shenandoah Valley.

Brought to Staunton from Rockingham County, the 1820s house was built by a German immigrant farmer in 1773. The original architecture of the home included similar elements of the German house, including a Stube. Around 1820, the descendent of the farmer added a parlor that reflects the English architectural tradition of the 18th century. While European cultural groups began to blend together to create a singular identity, their African American counterparts did not enjoy the same equality.

Approximately 25% of the Shenandoah Valley's population remained enslaved in the 1820s, and those who were free did not carry the rights as their white American neighbors.

== 1850s farm ==
By the 1850s, some of the same factors that brought people to the Shenandoah Valley began pushing populations further west.

The exhibit at the museum is from Botetourt Country, Virginia, and would have been owned by a family of plain folk. Plain folk were similar to the yeoman farmers represented in the English exhibit, they owned the land they worked and were able to produce a small income from their crops and livestock.

During the mid-nineteenth century, industrialization made it less expensive to procure manufactured goods, such as decorated ceramics. During this time, mass communication, such as newspapers and books, became more popular.

== 1840s schoolhouse ==
While the school system in the nineteenth century looks different than the American school system today, many families wanted to educate their children. Rural communities would often band together to purchase materials and recruit a teacher for basic lessons in reading, writing, and arithmetic.

The one room schoolhouse at the Frontier Culture Museum was built around 1840 and was originally located in Rockingham County, Virginia. This early education system in rural communities helped ensure that many Americans could ready, write, and perform basic mathematical calculations in the 18th and 19th centuries.

== 1860s African American Church ==
The original location of the African American church at the Frontier Culture Museum of Virginia was in New Hope, Virginia. The Mount Tabor United Methodist congregation's oral tradition states that the log church was constructed by enslaved African Americans before the 1850s, but there is no documentation to support its existence prior to 1860.

The Mount Tabor congregation seems to exemplify the large-scale movement of other Methodist congregations after the American Civil War. Many African Americans left the church to establish their own congregations, either leaving the Methodist Episcopal Church as a whole, or to establish independent congregations.

== Expansion ==
In 2025, the Frontier Culture Museum of Virginia announced an expansion with the American Journey Gallery. This building will consist of an updated visitor center and museum shop, a permanent exhibit hall, a temporary exhibit hall, and an updated pavilion for museum and private events alike. The expansion will also include a larger parking lot to better accommodate visitors and bus tours.

== See also ==
- Ulster American Folk Park, Northern Ireland
