= Nottoway =

Nottoway may refer to any of the following, in the United States:

== People ==
- Nottoway people, an Iroquoian tribe of Virginia
- Nottoway language, spoken by the Nottoway people

== State-recognized tribes ==
- Nottoway Indian Tribe of Virginia
- Cheroenhaka (Nottoway) Indian Tribe

== Geographic locations ==
- Nottoway River, a river in Virginia
- Nottoway County, Virginia, a county in Virginia
  - Nottoway, Virginia, an unincorporated community
  - Nottoway Correctional Center
  - Nottoway County Courthouse
  - Nottoway County High School

== Namesakes ==
- USS Nottoway, a United States Navy harbor tug formerly named USS Algonquin
- Nottoway Plantation, a demolished plantation house located near White Castle, Louisiana

== See also ==
- Nottawa (disambiguation)
