= Native American agriculture in Virginia =

As is the case with most native populations that did not use systems of writing for most or all of their history, much of what is known about Native Americans comes from the records of the Europeans who first encountered them in the late 16th and early 17th centuries. Some of these accounts are accurate, while some include parts that are accurate and other parts that reflect their biases towards native peoples. One aspect of native life which the European colonists often remarked upon, when they left written records, was their system of agriculture.

Agriculture is one of the primary means by which pre-industrial human societies impacted their environments; through plant and animal domestication, disruption of prehistoric soil matrices, and the resulting population increases that some degree of agricultural sophistication makes possible within partially nomadic or fully settled groups of people.

Given the topographical and climatological variances found within its borders, Virginia allowed for the development of several unique agricultural systems that worked in concert with traditional hunting and gathering systems. Post-European contact, these modes of subsistence were greatly altered as European technology was introduced to the native Virginians and their grip on their ancestral lands slowly receded towards the mountains.

== Background ==
History of Virginia The proposed and accepted dates for the beginning of native habitation in Virginia vary widely; traditionally, the assumed date was somewhere between 12,000–10,000 B.C. The recent archaeological excavations at Cactus Hill, however, have challenged those dates with hard evidence of far earlier habitation within the state.

The Cactus Hill site is located along the Nottoway River in southeast Virginia and is now one of the oldest known sites with evidence of human habitation in the country. Clovis-type tools found at the site have been radiocarbon dated to between 11,500–10,000 B.C., and the remains of hearth fires have been dated to around 15,000 B.C. Work continues at the site, but these findings appear to have set back the generally accepted start of human habitation in Virginia by about 5,000 years.

The periods between when native peoples first settled in Virginia (at least 15,000 B.C.) and about 2500 B.C. are called the Paleo and Archaic periods. Tribes in Virginia were hunter-gatherers during these periods and didn't establish permanent settlements. Semi-permanent habitations first appeared during the Sedentary Forager Period (2,500 B.C. – 900 A.D.) and larger settlements had developed by the Middle-to-Late Woodland Period.

== Tribe distribution ==
The tribes on the coast were part of the Powhatan confederacy. Individual tribes in the region included the Nansemond in the south, the Chickahominy, Pamunkey, and Mattaponi along the central coast, the Potomack on the north shore, and the Accomack on the Eastern Shore of Virginia. In the central and western regions of the state were the Monacan, Mannahoac, Saponi people, Nahyssan, Occaneechi, and Tutelo people. Some Cherokee lived in the southwest, and there was an isolated pocket of Nottoway people and Meherrin tribes in the south between the coast and the Piedmont.

Differences in agriculture resulted more from geographical variation than differences in tribal farming practices or customs.

== Origins of agriculture ==
Agriculture in Virginia is believed to have begun in the same manner that agriculture in most other places developed. Native Virginians made extensive use of wild plants in their subsistence systems, and it is hypothesized that the first attempts made at cultivation in Virginia were the selective nurturing of wild edible plants in ways that encouraged their growth. Eventually, such pseudo-agriculture developed into the purposeful planting, cultivation, and artificial selection of certain species and varieties. The agricultural systems that developed before the introduction of maize and other, more well-known native crops, have been dubbed the Eastern Agricultural Complex.

None of the domesticated crops that are usually associated with native Virginians are native to the area. Maize (Indian corn), the predominant native crop in the collective mind of most Americans, came up from Mexico and was incorporated into the native agricultural systems. Squash and beans, the other two crops that make up the famous "three sisters" agricultural trilogy, migrated up similar routes and eventually became firmly established in native agricultural systems in Virginia around 900 A.D. during the beginning of the Middle Woodland Period.

== Tidewater ==
Natives in the Chesapeake region and on the Eastern Shore practiced a variety of subsistence methods in order to provide for themselves throughout the year. They gathered wild plants, nuts, and fruit, hunted deer, turkey, and waterfowl, fished along the rivers that feed the Chesapeake, gathered shellfish and mollusks along the coast, and cultivated maize.

Some of the best farmland was in the river valleys on the Eastern Shore. By the Late Woodland Period (c. 900–1600 A.D.), however, flooding and rising sea levels made it impossible to farm the lower-lying areas closer to the shore. Once they were pushed onto the less fertile plots of land, native farmers had few choices for improving the lower natural fertility of the new soil. Lacking artificial fertilizers or, prior to European contact, crops that return nitrogen to the soil, natives relied on rotation systems to ensure that they always had at least a few fertile plots available at any one time. Thanks to the lower density populations that Eastern shore natives enjoyed, they were capable of taking plots out of cultivation for several years in order to restore fertility and soil nutrients.

== Piedmont ==
Thanks to the presence of numerous rivers, the Piedmont offered large amounts of fertile land for native habitation and cultivation. Native settlements tended to be established alongside river-adjacent fields and moved up and down the river every few years in order to allow the soil from the previous fields to be revitalized.

The "three sisters" agricultural concept was commonly implemented across the Piedmont. Aside from providing complete nutrients (when complemented with game and wild plants), the three plants worked cooperatively to preserve soil nutrients. The beans and squash (or gourds) fixed nitrogen in the soil and shaded the ground, preventing the growth of weeds, while the corn gave the beans a stalk to wind around as they grew. It also had the benefit of being a low maintenance form of agriculture; with the gourds holding down weed growth and little to no fertilization needing to be done, the plants could hold their own far more successfully than the labor-intensive European farming systems.

== Appalachians ==
The soil quality in the Appalachians was (and is) less productive than in other areas state; the hilly geography also makes farming larger areas of land difficult and some regions at higher elevation are drier and harder to grow in than areas lower on the mountains. As a result, agriculture was less pervasive in the mountains than in other regions. Corn was, however, still widely and successfully grown, along with other standard native crops such as variants of squash and domesticated species of formerly wild plants.

== Effects of European contact on native agriculture ==
The most punishing effect of European arrival and settlement was loss of land. Europeans relied more heavily on farming for their subsistence than the natives did, and were also far more likely to grow surplus crops that could be traded or sold. Thus the new arrivals needed large amounts of fertile land to support their quickly growing populations. Virginia's native population found itself being pushed towards – and eventually over – the mountains as European arrivals snatched up large land grants made by the English governors of the new colony.

Agriculture also impacted the relations between the Jamestown settlers and the nearby native populations. It's commonly known that sympathetic natives helped the agriculturally-ill equipped settlers to feed themselves, but the negative effects of those interactions aren't as widely recognized. Virginia suffered several droughts around the time that the Jamestown settlement was established, which limited the abilities of both the natives and the new settlers to provide for themselves. When the natives weren't able to give any more food to their new neighbors (out of concern for the feeding and care of their own people) the Jamestown residents became angered and relations between the two populations degraded significantly.

Another impact of European contact was the integration of European crops into native agricultural systems.

== Primary sources ==
Some of what is known about native agriculture in Virginia comes from archaeological evidence. The majority of the primary sources that mention native agriculture have some degree of Euro-centrism bias, usually with regard to the colonists' belief that native agriculture was "uncivilized" in some way, or that it didn't exist at all. The primary factor of native agriculture that made it so unappealing to European sensibilities was also the factor that made the native agricultural system so much more successful: the use of interactive crop types that cut down on the labor needed to maintain the fields, as well as enriching the soil and increasing the number of seasons that fields could be used. In some areas, native Virginians also planted their crops in and among the remains of the wooded areas that had been cut down so a field could be cleared. This debris made the fields look somewhat messy, but assisted in adding nutrients back into the soil (through decomposition) and made for an easier and quicker transition back to wild growth once the natives had moved on down the river.
