= Treaty of 1677 =

1677 treaty between England and various Virginia Native American tribes

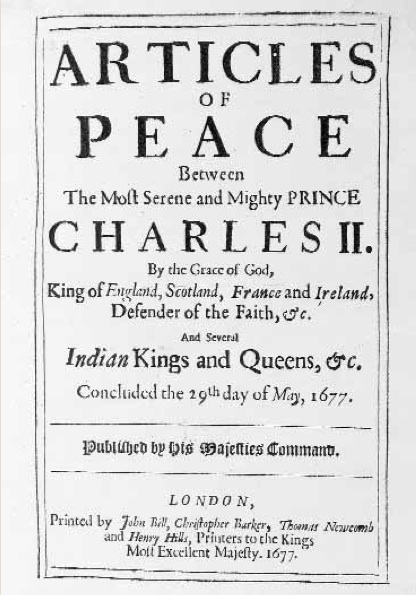
Title page of the Treaty of 1677.

The Treaty of 1677 (also known as the Treaty Between Virginia And The Indians 1677 or Treaty of Middle Plantation) was signed in Virginia on May 28, 1677, between the English Crown and representatives from Native American tribes in Virginia, including the Nottoway, the Appomattoc, the Wayonaoake, the Nansemond, the Nanzatico, the Monacan, the Saponi, and the Meherrin following the end of Bacon's Rebellion.

The treaty designated those that signed as "tributary tribes", which signified that they were guaranteed control over their traditional homelands, hunting and fishing rights, the right to keep and bear arms, and other rights so long as they maintained their loyalty towards the English Crown.

The twenty-one articles of the treaty were confirmed when the English sent gifts to the chiefs along with various badges of authority.

The Queen of Pamunkey, known as Cockacoeske to the English, received a red velvet cap which was fastened with a silver frontlet and silver chains.

== Witnesses ==
Native American leaders who signed the treaty include:

- Queen Pamunkey and her son, Captain John West
- The King of the Notowayes
- King Peracuta of the Appomattux†
- The Queen of Wayonaoake
- The King of the Nanzem'd
- King Pattanochus of the Nansatiocoes, Nanzemunds, and the Portabacchoes†
- King Shurenough of the Monacans†
- King Mastegonoe of the Sappones †
- Chief Tachapoake of the Sappones†
- Chief Vnuntsquero of the Maherians†
- Chief Horehonnah of the Maherians†
- Chief Suubaah of the Driplandyins†

†According to Dr. Helen Rountree, these signatories were added in an annexe between April and June 1680.

== See also ==
- List of treaties
