= Weyanoke people =

Historic Native American tribe in Virginia

Weyanoke
Total population
- merged into Nottoway

Regions with significant populations
- Virginia, United States

Languages
- unattested Eastern Algonquian language

Related ethnic groups
- Powhatan Confederacy, Nottoway

The Weyanoke people (/ˈwaɪənɒk/ WYE-ə-nok) were an Indigenous people of the Northeastern Woodlands.

== Name ==
Their name is also spelled Weyanock, as British colonist John Smith recorded on his map. Alternative spellings include Weanoc, Weanock, Winauh, Winauk, Wynauh, and Wynauk. Their name may mean "at the bend" of a river, coming from either the Eastern Niantic or Nipmuck language.

== Territory ==
The general location of 17th-century Weyanock territory marked by present-day Charles City County, Virginia.

Their lands were located along the James River and west of the mouth of Appomattox River, near present-day Weyanoke, Virginia. Their main capital settlement was at Weyanoke Point in Charles City County, Virginia. Their second primary settlement was at the head of Powell's Creek in Prince George County, Virginia.

=== History ===
At the beginning of the 17th century, when the Wyanoke had early contact with English colonists, the Weynock traded with Wahunsenacawh (Powhatan, c. 1547–c. 1618). Some historians consider them to have been part of the Powhatan Confederacy.

Their population was 500 in 1608. After attacks by the Haudenosaunee Confederacy at the end of the 17th century, they were forced to flee. They signed the Treaty of Middle Plantation with the Virginia Colony in 1677.

Remnants of the Weyanock and the Nansemond were merged into the Nottoway in the early 18th century.

By 1727, they lived along the Nottoway River. At the end of the 18th century, the Weyanock merged completely into the Nottoway, with the surnames Wynoake and Wineoak occasionally appearing on public documents.
