= Helen C. Rountree =

American ethnohistorian and author

- Born: 1944 (age 81–82); United States
- Occupations: ethnohistorian, researcher, author, professor
- Writing career
- Language: English
- Genre: non-fiction
- Subjects: Native Americans, Powhatans, Indigenous peoples of the Eastern Woodlands
- Notable works: The Powhatan Indians of Virginia (1989) and Pocahontas's People (1990)

Helen C. Rountree (born 1944) is an American ethnohistorian, author and professor who has published several books on the history of the Powhatan people and other Algonquian peoples in the Chesapeake region. She has also published books and lectured on the topics of Native American tribes in other Mid-Atlantic states and the southern US, as well as tribes in the state of Nevada.

She is the author of eighteen books and co-author of two books. Rountree has also contributed chapters and articles to other books and media. She is a Professor Emerita for Anthropology in the Old Dominion University.

== Biography ==
Rountree was born in 1944 and holds degrees from College of William and Mary, the University of Utah, and the University of Wisconsin, Milwaukee.

Rountree has been studying the Powhatan tribe since 1969. She completed fieldwork for the Doris Duke Foundation in Nevada in the 1970s as part of her graduate work in American oral history. Rountree has compared the Native Americans in Nevada to the communities she encountered on a trip to the Mattaponi reservation in Virginia, noting "they sounded in their attitudes like the reservation people [she] knew in Nevada." The publication of her 1990 book, Pocohontas's People, has been described as a "watershed event" for the Native tribes in Virginia.

In 2008, Rountree appeared as a witness before the United States Senate Committee on Indian Affairs to testify on behalf of six tribes in Virginia (Chickahominy, Eastern Chickahominy, Upper Mattaponi, Rappahannock, Monacan and Nansemond) seeking federal recognition in her capacity as a noted anthropologist. In the following year, Rountree presented a statement to the United States House Committee on Natural Resources in support of the Virginia tribal nations gaining federal recognition via the Thomasina E. Jordan Indian Tribes of Virginia Federal Recognition Act of 2009. All six Virginia tribal nations seeking recognition eventually gained it in 2018 with the passage of the Thomasina E. Jordan Indian Tribes of Virginia Federal Recognition Act of 2018.

Rountree has been described as "possibly post-revisionist" and an expert on the Algonquian-speaking Indians of the Southeastern United States. Author Arica L. Coleman states Rountree distorted the history of tribes in Virginia, downplaying interactions with African-Americans and over-emphasizing intermarriage with white Americans. She criticizes her for her rejection of the Nottoway Indian Tribe of Virginia, stating she claimed them to be extinct due to them not self-segregating from African-Americans.

She has appeared on C-SPAN four times as part of panels and symposiums concerning Pocahontas, Eastern Woodlands tribes, and Native Americans in Virginia.

== Awards ==
Rountree was awarded the 2013 Thomas Jefferson Medal for Outstanding Contributions to Natural Science given by the Virginia Museum of Natural History. Rountree was also the recipient of the American Society of Ethnohistory Lifetime Achievement Award of 2020–2021.

== Selected bibliography ==
- Rountree, Helen (2021). Manteo's World: Native American Life in Carolina's Sound Country before and after the Lost Colony. The University of North Carolina Press.
- Rountree, Helen (2017). Powhatan Indian Place Names in Tidewater Virginia. Genealogical Publishing Company.
- Rountree, Helen (2010). Indians of Southern Maryland. The Maryland Center for History and Culture.
- Rountree, Helen (2005). Pocahontas, Powhatan, Opechancanough: Three Indian Lives Changed by Jamestown. Maryland Historical Society.
- Rountree, Helen (2002). Before and After Jamestown: Virginia's Powhatans and Their Predecessors. University Press of Florida.
- Rountree, Helen (1997). Eastern Shore Indians of Virginia and Maryland. University Press of Florida.
- Rountree, Helen (1990). Pocahontas's People: The Powhatan Indians of Virginia Through Four Centuries. University of Oklahoma Press.
- Rountree, Helen (1990). Young Pocahontas in the Indian World. J & R Graphic Services, Inc.
- Rountree, Helen (1989). The Powhatan Indians of Virginia: Their Traditional Culture. University of Virginia Press.

=== Co-author ===
- Rountree, Helen; Kierner, Cynthia A.; Treadway, Sandra Gioia, eds. (1990). Virginia Women: Their Lives and Times, Volume 1. Wormsloe Foundation Nature Books.
- Rountree, Helen; Turner, E. Randolph III (2002). Before and After Jamestown: Virginia's Powhatans and Their Predecessors. University Press of Florida.
