= Nottawa =

Nottawa may refer to the following places:

In Canada:

- Nottawa, Ontario

In the United States:

- Nottawa Township, Isabella County, Michigan
- Nottawa Township, St. Joseph County, Michigan
- Nottawa Creek, also known as Nottawa River, in Michigan

== See also ==
- Nottawaseppi Huron Band of Potawatomi, (originally known as "Nottawa-seepe") namesake of township in St. Joseph County, Michigan
- Nottaway River, in Quebec, Canada
- Nottoway (disambiguation)
