= Pamunkey language =

Extinct unclassified language of Virginia, United States

Pamunkey
- ReNaPew
- Native to: United States
- Region: Virginia
- Ethnicity: Pamunkey
- Era: attested 1844
- Language family: unclassified (Algonquian?)

Language codes
- ISO 639-3: None (mis)
- Glottolog: pamu1240

The Pamunkey language is an extinct language that was spoken by the Pamunkey people of Virginia, United States.

The Pamunkey language is generally assumed to have been Algonquian. However, only fourteen words have been preserved, which is not enough to determine that the language actually was Algonquian.

== Word list ==
The only attested Pamunkey words, which were recorded in 1844 by Reverend E.A. Dalrymple S.T.D., are:

English	Pamunkey
son	tonshee
daughter	nucksee
cat	petucka
thankfulness	kayyo
O my Lord	o-ma-yah
friendship	kenaanee
thank you	baskonee
go out dog	eeskut
one	nikkut
two	orijak
three	kiketock
four	mitture
five	nahnkitty
six	vomtally
seven	talliko
eight	tingdum
ten	yantay

== Lexical comparison ==
Below is a comparison of Pamunkey words and selected proto-languages from Zamponi (2024).

gloss	Pamunkey	Proto-Algonquian	Proto-Iroquoian (PI)/ Proto-Northern Iroquoian (PNI)	Proto-Siouan
son	tonshee	*wekwiʔsema·wa		*iyįḱe
daughter	nucksee	*weta·nema·wa		*iyų́·ke
cat	petucka	*ka·šake·nsa		
thankfulness	kayyo			
O my Lord	o-ma-yah			
friendship	kenaanee			
thank you	baskonee			*hahó
go out dog	eeskut			
one	nikkut	*nekwetwi	*õskat (PNI)	*rų·sa
two	orijak	*nyi·šwi	*tekniːh (PNI)	*rų́·pa
three	kiketock	*neʔθwi	*ahsẽh (PNI)	*rá·wrį
four	mitture	*nye·wi	*kajeɹi (PNI)	*tó·pa
five	nahnkitty	*nya·θanwi, *pale·neθkwi	*hwihsk (PI)	*kiSų́·
six	vomtally	*nekweta·šyeka	*tsjotaɹeʔ (?) (PI)	*aká·we
seven	talliko	*nyi·šwa·šyeka	*tsjotaɹeʔ (?) (PI)	*ša·kú·pa
eight	tingdum	*neʔneʔšwa·šik, *neʔšwa·šyeka	*tekɹõʔ (PI)	
ten	yantay	*meta·hθwi, *meta·tahθwi	*wahshẽ (PI)	*hą

Except for nikkut 'one', which is clearly similar to Powhatan nekut, none of the words correspond to any known Algonquian language, or to reconstructions of proto-Algonquian. Given the extensive ethnic mixing that occurred among the Pamunkey before 1844, it is possible that Dalrymple's list is from an inter-ethnic pidgin or even a language from an otherwise unknown language family, rather than from the original Pamunkey language.

There is a possible link between nucksee 'daughter' and Choptank Nanticoke Nucks-quah 'son', documented by William Vans Murray in 1792. This corresponds to uksa//ùc-sa 'son' in other Nanticoke dialects.

== See also ==
- Nansemond language
