= Nansemond language =

Extinct unclassified language of Virginia, United States

Nansemond
- ReNaPew
- Native to: United States
- Region: Virginia
- Ethnicity: Nansemond
- Era: attested 1901
- Language family: unclassified (Algonquian?)

Language codes
- ISO 639-3: None (mis)
- Glottolog: None

The Nansemond language is an extinct language that was spoken by the Nansemond people of Virginia, United States.

The Nansemond language may have been a member of the Algonquian language family, similar to that of many other Atlantic coastal tribes. However, only six words have been preserved, which are not enough to identify and classify it.

== Word list ==
The six Nansemond words, which may have been corrupted in memory by the time they were written down in 1901, are:

| English | Nansemond |
|---|---|
| one | nĭkătwĭn |
| two | näkătwĭn |
| three | nikwásăti |
| four | toisíaw’ |
| five | mishä́naw |
| dog | marímo |

There are a few Nansemond words that were historically documented by John Smith, including:

fishing point Nansemond
??? Mattanock
??? Chuckatuck
??? Weyhohomo
non-Christian/Nansemond Pochick

== Lexical comparison ==
Below is a comparison of Nansemond words and selected proto-languages from Zamponi (2024).

| language | one | two | three | four | five | dog |
|---|---|---|---|---|---|---|
| Nansemond | nĭkătwĭn | näkătwĭn | nikwásăti | toisíaw’ | mishäʹnaw | marímo |
| Proto-Algonquian | *nekwetwi | *nyi·šwi | *neʔθwi | *nye·wi | *nya·θanwi, pale·neθkwi | *aθemwa |
| Proto-Iroquoian (PI)/ Proto-Northern Iroquoian (PNI) | *õskat (PNI) | *tekniːh (PNI) | *ahsẽh (PNI) | *kajeɹi (PNI) | *hwihsk (PI) | *kiːɹ (PI) |
| Proto-Siouan | *rų·sa | *rų́·pa | *rá·wrį | *tó·pa | *kiSų́· | *wašų́ke/*wišų́·ke |

== See also ==
- Pamunkey language
