= Proto-Iroquoian language =

Reconstructed ancestor of the Iroquoian languages

Proto-Iroquoian
- Reconstruction of: Iroquoian languages
- Era: 1500 BCE

Proto-Iroquoian is the reconstructed ancestor of the Iroquoian languages. In 1961, Floyd Lounsbury estimated from glottochronology a time depth of 3,500 to 3,800 years for the split of North and South Iroquoian.

At the time of early European contact, French explorers in the 16th century encountered villages along the St. Lawrence River, now associated with the St. Lawrence Iroquoian. Other better known northern tribes took over their territory and displaced them, and were later encountered by more French, European and English colonists. These tribes included the Wendat and Neutral in modern-day Ontario, first encountered by French explorers and traders; the Five Nations of the Haudenosaunee League (Iroquois) in Upstate New York and Pennsylvania, and the Erie Nation and Susquehannock peoples in Pennsylvania.

Southern speakers of Iroquoian languages ranged from the Cherokee in the Great Smoky Mountains, to the Tuscarora and Nottoway in the interior near the modern Virginia/North Carolina border.

== Subdivisions ==
The Iroquoian languages are usually divided into two main groups: Southern Iroquoian (Cherokee) and Northern Iroquoian (all others) based on the great differences in vocabulary and modern phonology. Northern Iroquoian is further divided by Lounsbury and Mithun into Proto-Tuscarora-Nottoway and Lake Iroquoian. Julian does not believe Lake Iroquoian to be a valid subgrouping.

== History of studies ==
Isolated studies were done by Wallace Chafe, Karin Michelson, and Blair Rudes. There have also been several works of internal reconstruction for daughter languages, in particular Seneca and Mohawk. A preliminary full reconstruction of Proto-Iroquoian was not provided until Charles Julian's work in 2010.

== Phonology ==
Proto-Iroquoian as reconstructed shares the Iroquoian languages' notable typological traits of small consonant inventories, complex consonant clusters, and a lack of labial consonants.

=== Vowels ===
The reconstructed vowel inventory for Proto-Iroquoian is:

		Front		Central		Back	
		short	long	short	long	short	long
Close		*i	*iː			*u	*uː
Mid	oral	*e	*eː			*o	*oː
Mid	nasal	*ẽ	*ẽː			*õ	*õː
Open				*a	*aː		

Like later Iroquoian languages, Proto-Iroquoian is distinguished in having nasal vowels /õ/ and /ẽ/, although it has more than in its daughter languages.

=== Consonants ===
The reconstructed consonant inventory for Proto-Iroquoian is given in the table below. The consonants of all Iroquoian languages pattern so that they may be grouped as (oral) obstruents, sibilants, laryngeals, and resonants.

	Alveolar	Dorsal		Glottal
	Alveolar	plain	labial	Glottal
Nasal	*n			
Plosive	*t	*k	*kʷ	*ʔ
Affricate	*ts			
Fricative	*s			*h
Approximant	*ɹ	*j	*w	

== Morphology ==
Reconstructed functional morphemes from Charles Julian:

Reconstructed functional morphemes from Julian (2010)

No.	Gloss	Proto-Iroquoian	Proto-Northern Iroquoian
1	'negative'		*teʔ
2	'coincident' (perhaps also relativizer)	*ts	
3	'contrastive'		*thi
4	'partitive'	*ijiː	
5	'translocative'	*wi	
6	'factual'		*waʔ
7	'duplicative'	*teː	
8	'future'	*ẽː	
9	'optative'		*aɹa
10	'cislocative'	*t	
11	'repetitive'	*ts	
12	'non-singular animate'	*ka	
13	'1:2.SG'	*kõː	
14	'1:2.DU'		*kni
15	'1:2.PL'		*kwa
16	'2:1.SG'	*hskʷi	
17	'2:1.DU'	*hskniː	
18	'2:1.PL'	*hskʷ…	
19	'1SG:3'	*ki	
20	1SG:3A' (> PNI '1SG:3I')	*kiji	
21	'1SG:3M'		*he or *hɹi
22	'2SG:3'	*hsi	
23	2SG:3A' (> PNI '2SG:3I')	*hsiji	
24	'2SG:3M'		*hehse
25	'3:1SG'	*wakʷi	
26	3A:1SG' (> PNI '3I:1SG')	*jõːkʷi	
27	'3M:1SG'		*hɹake
28	'3:2SG'	*tsa	
29	3A:2SG' (> PNI 3I:2SG')	*jeːtsa	
30	'3M:2SG'		*hja
31	'2DU&3'	*tsniː	
32	'2DU&3M'		*hshetsni
33	'2PL&3'	*ts…	
34	'2PL&3M'		*hshetswa
35	'2NS&3I'		*jetshi
36	'1+2DU:3'	*tniː	
37	'1+2DU:3M'		*hshetni
38	'1+2PL:3'	*t…	
39	'1+2PL:3M'		*hshetwa
40	'1+3DU:3'		*jakni
41	'1+3DU:3M'		*hshakni
42	'1+3PL:3'		*jakwa
43	'1+3PL:3M'		*hshakwa
44	'3:1DU'	*kniː	
45	'3M:1DU'		*hshõkni
46	'3:1PL'	*kʷ…	
47	'3M:1PL'		*hshõkwa
48	'1+2NS:3I' (limited to Iroquoia)		*jethi
49	1+3NS:3I' (> Hu. 1NS:3I)		*jakhi
50	3I:1NS' (> Tu. '1NS&3I')		*jõkhi
51	'3SG:3' (lexically determined variant 1)	*ka	
52	'3SG:3' (lexically determined variant 2)	*wa	
53	'3SGM:3'		*hɹa
54	'3:3SG'	*juː	
55	'3:3SGM'		*hɹo
56	'3DU:3'		*kni
57	'3DUM:3'		*hni
58	3NS:3' (> PNI '3PL:3')	*wantiː	
59	'3PL:3' (second variant, in competition with *wati, #58)		*kõti
60	'3PLM:3'		*hɹati
61	'3:3NS'	*juːntiː	
62	'3:3NSM'		*hɹoti
63	'3I:3'		*je
64	'3:3I'		*jako
65	'3SGM:3I'		*hshako
66	3A:3SGA' (> Ch. '3NS:3SG', PNI '3I:3SG')	*kõːwa	
67	'3I:3SGM'		*hɹõwa
68	3A:3NSA' (> Ch. '3NS:3NS', PNI '3I:3NS')	*kõːwantiː	
69	'3I:3NSM'		*hɹõwati
70	'3NS:3I' (limited to Iroquoia)		*jakoti
71	'3NSM:3I' (limited to Iroquoia)		*hshakoti
72	'2:1.SG.IMP'		*take
73	'2:1.DU.IMP'		*takni
74	'1:2.PL.IMP'		*takwa
75	'2SG:3.IMP'		*tse
76	'reflexive'	*ataːt	
77	'semireflexive' (lexically determined variant 1)	*at	
78	'semireflexive' (lexically determined variant 2)	*aɹ	
79	'joiner vowel'	*a	
80	'nominalizer' (lexically determined variant 1)		*hsɹ
81	'nominalizer' (lexically determined variant 2)		*ʔtshɹ
82	'causative-instrumental' (lexically determined variant 1)	*t	
83	'causative-instrumental' (lexically determined variant 2)	*hst	
84	'instrumental'		*hkw
85	'reversive' (PNI lexically determined variant 1)	*kʷ	
86	'reversive' (lexically determined variant 2)		*hsj
87	'inchoative'		*ʔ
88	'dative-benefactive' (PNI lexically determined variant 1)	*ts	
89	'dative-benefactive' (lexically determined variant 2)		*ẽ
90	'dative-benefactive' (lexically determined variant 3)		*ni
91	'dislocative' (lexically determined variant 1)		*n
92	'dislocative' (lexically determined variant 2)		*h
93	'dislocative' (lexically determined variant 3)		*ts
94	'dislocative' (lexically determined variant 4)		*tsɹ
95	'dislocative' (lexically determined variant 5, limited to Iroquoia)		*ɹ
96	'distributive' (lexically determined variant 1)		*njõː
97	'distributive' (lexically determined variant 2)		*nõː
98	'distributive' (lexically determined variant 3)		*hõː
99	'distributive' (lexically determined variant 4)		*õː
100	'distributive' (lexically determined variant 5)		*ɹõː
101	'distributive' (lexically determined variant 6)		*ɹjõː
102	'distributive' (lexically determined variant 7)		*tsõː
103	'distributive' (lexically determined variant 8)		*tsɹõː
104	'progressive'		*tjeʔ
105	'present suffix' (lexically determined variant 1)		*hs
106	'present suffix' (lexically determined variant 2)		*ts
107	'present suffix' (lexically determined variant 3)		*haʔ
108	'present suffix' (lexically determined variant 4)		*h
109	'imperfective suffix' (cf. Cherokee imperfective verbs inhsk)		*hsk
110	'past habitual suffix'		*kʷ
111	'punctual suffix' (lexically determined variant 1)		*ʔ
112	'punctual suffix' (lexically determined variant 2)		*ẽʔ
113	'punctual suffix' (lexically determined variant 3)		*Ø
114	'punctual suffix' (lexically determined variant 4)		*n
115	'perfect suffix' (lexically determined variant 1)		*õh
116	'perfect suffix' (lexically determined variant 2)		*ẽh
117	'perfect suffix' (lexically determined variant 3)		*Ø
118	'perfect suffix' (lexically determined variant 4)		*eʔ
119	'perfect suffix' (lexically determined variant 5)		*ih
120	'past perfect suffix'		*n
121	'facilitative suffix'		*nskõːh
122	'modalizer suffix'		*k
123	'noun suffix'		*aʔ
124	'authenticative suffix'		*õweh
125	'characterizer suffix'		*haːʔ
126	'decessive suffix'		*kẽh
127	'intensifier suffix'		*tsih
128	'locative suffix'		*keh
129	'populative suffix' (lexically determined variant 1)		*ɹonõʔ
130	'populative suffix' (lexically determined variant 2)		*kaːʔ

== Lexicon ==
Reconstructed lexical roots and particles from Charles Julian:

Reconstructed lexical roots and particles from Julian (2010)

No.	Gloss	Proto-Iroquoian	Proto-Northern Iroquoian	Proto-Mohawk- Oneida	Huron (Common Huron-Petun)
131	'path, road, trail'		*-ah-, *-(a)hah-		
132	'be bad, be ugly, be useless'		*-(a)hetkẽʔ		
133	'be salty, be sour'		*-ahjoʔtsihs, *-oʔtsihst-		
134	'bark, wood, wood chips'		*-ahkaɹ-		
135	'be ten'		*-ahnshẽːh		
136	'ear'		*-(a)hõht-		
137	'count'		*-(a)hɹaːt-		
138	'hear, speak a language, understand'		*-ahɹõk-		
139	'foot'	*-aːhs-, *-aːhsiʔt-			
140	'three'		*ahsẽh		
141	'string'			*ahsɹijeʔ	
142	'shoe'		*-ahtahkʷ-, *ahtaʔ		
143	'be forbidden, be prohibited, be strict, be taboo'		*-ahtjawẽɹeʔ		
144	'abandon, give up, leave behind, let go, quit, release'		*-ahtkaʔw-		
145	'disappear, vanish'		*-ahtõ-, *-ahtõʔ-		
146	'hide'		*-ahtseht-		
147	'argue for, compete for, contend for, fight for'		*-ahtskehnh-		
148	'not yet, still'		*ahtsõh, *atsõh		
149	'night'	*-ahtsõːh-			
150	'connect, fasten, join together'		*-ahtsõtɹ-		
151	'be durable, be hard, be strong'		*-akanst-, *-anst-, *-kanst-		
152	'be a number, be an amount, be that many'		*-akeːh, *-keːh		
153	'be bad'		*-aksẽːh		
154	'cry'		*-anstaɹ-		
155	'outdoors, outside'		*ansteh		
156	'shoe'	*-aɹaːhsu-			
157	'be cousins'		*-aɹaʔtseːʔ		
158	'about, almost, approximately'	*aɹeʔ			
159	'be inside, be one, be present, be within, exist'		*-aːt		
160	'speak, talk'		*-atati-, *-atatj-		
161	'bathe, swim'	*-atawẽ-			
162	'climb over, go over'	*-atawẽːhɹat-			
163	'be ashamed, be embarrassed'	*-ateːhẽːh-			
164	'be burning, burn'		*-atek-		
165	'burn, cause to burn, light a fire'		*-atekaʔt-		
166	'use to light a fire'		*-atekaʔtahkw-		
167	'be a doctor, cure, heal'		*-atetsjẽʔt-		
168	'food taken along, provisions'		*-atẽnaʔtshɹ-		
169	'be a member of the Wolf Clan' (limited to Iroquoia)		*-athahjõniːh		
170	'be cold, be cold out, cold'		*-athoɹ-, *athoʔ		
171	'hear'	*-athõː-			
172	'garter' (limited to Iroquoia)		*-athsinh-, *-athsinhatshɹ-		
173	'be burnt, be consumed, be used up, burn, use oneself up'		*-athsʔaht-		
174	'abandon, throw, throw out'		*-ati-, *-atj-, *-õti-, *-õtj-		
175	'draw, pull, stretch'		*-atiɹõːt-		
176	'get dressed, put on' (limited to Iroquoia)		*-atjaʔtawiʔt-		
177	'harbour, hold back, keep'			*-atjenawahst-	
178	'be cheap, be easy, be profligate, squander'		*-atjets-		
179	'look at'	*-atkahthw-			
180	'purulence, pus'		*-atkẽhtsɹ-		
181	'be a sorcerer, be a spirit, have inherent power'		*-atkõʔ		
182	'axe'		*atokẽʔ		
183	'spoon' (limited to Iroquoia)		*-atokw-, *-atokwaʔtshɹ-		
184	'hunt'		*-atoɹaːt-		
185	'breathe'	*-atõːɹ-			
186	'laugh, laugh out loud' (limited to Iroquoia)		*-atõtaɹikt-		
187	'meet, meet by chance'		*-atɹaʔ-		
188	'grandchild, have as grandchild'		*-atɹe-		
189	'be green, be new'	*-atseːʔ			
190	'be glad, be happy'		*-atshẽnõni-		
191	'dry out, dry up, evaporate, run dry'		*-atst-, *-atstathẽ-		
192	'abandon, lend, let go, spare' (limited to Iroquoia)		*-atwẽteht-		
193	'fence, palisade'		*-atʔẽhɹ-		
194	'belong to, own, possess'		*-awẽh		
195	'stir'		*-awẽɹi-, *-awẽɹj-		
196	'water'	*awẽʔ			
197	'be small'		*-aʔ-, *-aʔaːh		
198	'lace, net, netting, web' (limited to Iroquoia)		*-aʔaɹ-		
199	'dew'		*-aʔawj –		
200	'strike'		*-aʔe-		
201	'become dark, become night'		*-aʔkaɹaʔ-, *-aʔkɹaʔ-		
202	'snow, snowflake' (limited to Iroquoia)		*-aʔkɹ-		
203	'turtle' (limited to Iroquoia)		*-aʔnowaɹ-, *-ʔnowaɹ-		
204	'be hot, be warm'		*-aʔtaɹihẽːh		
205	'heat, sweat'		*-aʔtaɹihẽhsɹ-		
206	'axe'		*-aʔtsɹ-		
207	'be extinguished, fire to go out'		*-aʔtsw-		
208	'extinguish, put out a fire'		*-aʔtswaht-		
209	'come, go, go on foot, walk'	*-e-			
210	'remember'		*-ehjahɹ-		
211	'believe, think'	*-eːɹ-			
212	'heart'		*-eɹjahs-		
213	'a lot, much'		*etsoʔ, *itsoʔ, *itswaʔ		
214	'above, high, over'		*eʔnkẽh, *heʔnkẽh		
215	'flower' (limited to Iroquoia)		*-ẽh-		
216	'day' (limited to Iroquoia)		*-ẽhnitsɹ-		
217	'be uncle to, have as nephew or niece'		*-ẽhwatẽʔ, *-jẽhwatẽʔ		
218	'be born, establish oneself'		*-ẽnakɹaːt-		
219	'day'		*-ẽt-		
220	'be finished, be over, be prepared, be ready, come to an end'		*-ẽtaʔ-		
221	'drop, fall'	*-ẽʔ-			
222	'nine'		*ẽʔtɹõʔ, *waʔtɹõh, *waʔtɹõʔ		
223	'council fire, flame, torch'		*-hahsɹ-		
224	'cornstalk, grass'		*-heɹ-		
225	'shout, yell'		*-hẽɹeht-		
226	'clearing, field, meadow'		*-hẽt-		
227	'mark, write'		*-hjatõ-		
228	'book, something marked, something written'		*-hjatõhsɹ-		
229	'claw'	*-hkaɹ-			
230	'current, moving water, rapids'		*-hnaw-		
231	'arm, shoulder'	*-hnẽː-			
232	'command, employ, hire'		*-hnhaʔ-		
233	'door'		*-hnhoh-, *-hnhohw-		
234	'close a door, door to be closed'		*-hnhotõ-		
235	'have jowls protruding' (> cattle, cow)		*-hnh(o/õ)hskʷ(a/e)ɹõːt		
236	'feed, put in the mouth'		*-hnhõtho-, *-hnhõthw-		
237	'be durable, be hard, be solid, be strong'		*-hniɹ-		
238	'thigh'		*-hnitsh-		
239	'neck, throat'	*-hnj-			
240	'tie'		*-hnɹ-		
241	'basswood'		*-hohsɹ-, *-hotsɹ-		
242	'bread'		*-hɹahkʷ-		
243	'feather'		*-hɹaʔt-		
244	'cut'		*-hɹen-		
245	'fall, fall over'		*-hɹjenẽʔ-, *-ʔɹhjenẽʔ-		
246	'tell' (limited to Iroquoia)		*-hɹoɹi-, *-hɹoɹj-		
247	'name, reputation'		*-hsẽn-		
248	'dough' (limited to Iroquoia)		*-hsheʔɹ-,-hsheʔɹh-		
249	'depression, depth, hole, hollow.		*-hshõw-		
250	'detest, dislike, hate'		*-hshwahẽ-, *-hshwẽ-		
251	'ankle, knee'		*-hsinkoʔt-		
252	'slow'	*-hskanẽ-			
253	'be good' (limited to Iroquoia)		*-hskaːths		
254	'deer'		*-hskẽnõtõʔ		
255	'bone'		*-hskẽʔɹ-; *-hskẽʔɹakeht- 'be a warrior', lit. 'carry the bone'		
256	'head'	*-hskʷ-			
257	'finger, hand'		*-hsnõhs-, *-hsnõʔ		
258	'be fast, be quick'	*-hsnuːɹiʔ			
259	'be ancestor to, be grandparent to'		*-hsoːt		
260	'build, make, prepare'	*-hsɹõːn-			
261	'use'		*-hst-		
262	'marrow'		*-hstahɹõw-		
263	'be little, be small'	*-hsthwih, *-hstwih			
264	'back'		*-hsw-		
265	'board, wood'		*-hswẽʔkaɹ-, *-hwẽʔkaɹ-, *-hwẽʔkhaɹ-		
266	'complete, exhaust, finish'		*-hsʔ-, *-ihsʔ-		
267	'have as older sibling, have as older maternal female cousin'		*-htsiʔ		
268	'colour, dye, paint'	*-htsuːhw-			
269	'family'		*-hwatsiɹ-		
270	'be round'		*-hweʔnõniːh		
271	'foam'		*-hwẽʔnst-		
272	'force, strength'		*-hwihsh-		
273	'five'	*hwihsk			
274	'metal, money'		*-hwihst-		
275	'be, be the one, exist'	*-iː-			
276	'be dead, die'		*-ihej-		
277	'cross over'		*-ihjaʔk-, *-jahjaʔk-		
278	'creek, river'		*-ijhõh-, *-ijhõhw-, *-wjhõh-		
279	'be beautiful, be good, be great'		*-ijoːh		
280	'emerge, go out, put out'		*-inkẽʔ-		
281	'far'	*iːnõh			
282	'mattress, sheet, spread'		*-inskaɹ-		
283	'be sitting, sit' (limited to Iroquoia)		*-inskoːt		
284	'saliva, spit, spittle'		*-inskɹ-		
285	'fish scale'		*-inst-		
286	'cliff, rock, rock bank'		*-instẽhɹ-, *-nstẽhɹ-		
287	'sleep'		*-itaʔw-, *-itʔo-		
288	'crowd, group'		*-itjohkʷ-		
289	'you'		*iːts		
290	'shoot'		*-iʔaːk-, *-iʔjaːk-, *-ʔjaːk-		
291	'clan, clay, hearth'		*-iʔtaɹ-, *-ʔtaɹ-		
292	'abide, dwell, reside, sit'		*-iʔtɹõ-		
293	'exit, go out, leave'		*-jakẽʔ-		
294	'footprint, gait, track'		*-jan-		
295	'be a chief, be good, be lawful, be proper' (limited to Iroquoia)		*-janɹ-		
296	'law'		*-janɹehsɹ-, *-janrẽhsɹ-		
297	'break, cut'		*-jaʔk-		
298	'being, body, carcass, corpse, person'		*-jaʔt-		
299	'wake up'	*-je-			
300	'add, contribute, mix'		*-jehst-		
301	'capture, catch, grab'		*-jena-, *-jenaw-		
302	'act, do, happen to'		*-jeɹ-		
303	'be complete, be just, be perfect, be right'		*-jeɹi-		
304	'body'	*-jeːɹõʔ-			
305	'smile'	*-jeːts-			
306	'be situated, exist, have, put down, set down, sit down'		*-jẽ-		
307	'hit, strike'		*-jẽht-		
308	'firewood, wood' (limited to Iroquoia)		*-jẽt-		
309	'accumulate, beget, get, obtain'		*-jẽtaʔ-		
310	'know'		*-jẽteɹ-		
311	'plant, sow'		*-jẽtho-, *-jẽthw-		
312	'flay, skin'		*-jẽtsɹ-		
313	'have as child'		*-jẽʔ-		
314	'smoke, tobacco'		*-jẽʔkʷ-		
315	'enter'	*-jõ-			
316	'eat'	*-k-			
317	'butterfly'	*kahnaːwẽːh			
318	'look at' (limited to Iroquoia)		*-kahnɹ-		
319	'eye'		*-kahɹ-		
320	'four'		*kajeɹih		
321	'be old'	*-kajõ-			
322	'anywhere, somewhere' (limited to Iroquoia)		*kankaʔ		
323	'pipe'	*kanõːnowẽʔ			
324	'bite'	*-kaɹ-			
325	'account, price, story'		*-kaɹ-		
326	'roll, turn around' (limited to Iroquoia)		*-kaɹhateni-, *-kaɹhatenj-		
327	'invert, roll over, turn over'		*-kaɹhatho-, *-kaɹhathw-		
328	'tree'		*kaɹhit, *keɹhit, *keɹhiʔ, *kɹaheːt, *kɹahit		
329	'come here!'		*katsih		
330	'paddle, row'	*-kaweː-			
331	'lift, raise'		*-kensko-, *-kenskʷ-		
332	'see'	*-kẽ-, *-kẽːh			
333	'be old'		*-kẽhtsi-		
334	'summer'		*-kẽnh-		
335	'be white'		*-kẽɹat		
336	'peel, scrape' (limited to Iroquoia)		*-kẽtsɹ-		
337	'divide, separate'		*-kh-, *-khahsi-, *-khahsj-, *-khahsk-		
338	'elbow'	*-khjuːhs-			
339	'food, meal'		*-khw-		
340	'chipmunk'	*kihɹjuʔkẽh			
341	'dog'	*kiːɹ			
342	'hair'	*-kiʔɹh-			
343	'crow'	*koːhkaːʔ			
344	'be a lot, be many, be much'	*-koʔtiʔ			
345	'face'	*-kõːhs-			
346	'eel'		*kõteh		
347	'bowl, dish, plate'		*-kts-		
348	'acorn, oak'	*kuːɹeh			
349	'be big, be large'	*-kuwa-, *-kʷa-			
350	'pick up'	*-kʷ-			
351	'be able'		*-kʷeni-, *-kʷenj-		
352	'that, the, this'	*nV(H)			
353	'domestic animal, prisoner, slave'		*-nahskʷ-		
354	'be autochthonous, dwell, reside'	*-nakɹ-			
355	'bed, place, room, space'		*-nakt-, *-nakʷt-		
356	'camp, city, settlement, town, village'		*-nat-		
357	'grain, wheat'		*-natsj-		
358	'be melted, be warm, be wet'	*-nawẽːh			
359	'antler, horn'		*-naʔkaɹ-		
360	'imitate'		*-naʔkeɹ-		
361	'bread'		*-naʔtaɹ-		
362	'call' (limited to Iroquoia)		*-naʔtõhkʷ-		
363	'cauldron, kettle, pail, pot'		*-naʔtsj-		
364	'liquid'	*-neː-			
365	'ice'	*-neːhst-, *-neːhstwaɹ			
366	'corn, grain, kernel'	*-nẽh-			
367	'now'	*nẽh			
368	'steal'	*-nẽːhskʷ-			
369	'sand; stone'	*-nẽːj-			
370	'arm'		*-nẽtsh-		
371	'be stingy' (limited to Iroquoia)		*-niʔ-		
372	'marry'		*-njaːk-		
373	'neck'		*-njaɹ-		
374	'lake'		*-njataɹ-		
375	'wampum'		*-nkoʔɹ-, *-nkoʔɹh-		
376	'blood'		*-nkõ-, *-nkʷẽhs-		
377	'red' (limited to Iroquoia)		*-nkʷẽhtaɹ-		
378	'begin to snow'		*-nkʷẽʔ-		
379	'be cold'		*-noːh		
380	'tooth'		*-noʔts-, *-noʔtsj-		
381	'medicine'		*-nõhkʷ-, *-nõhkʷaʔt-, *-nõhkʷaʔtshɹ-		
382	'house'	*-nõhs-			
383	'be painful, be sore, hurt'		*-nõhwakt-		
384	'admire, like'		*-nõhweʔ-		
385	'hill, mountain'		*-nõt-		
386	'corn soup, hominy' (limited to Iroquoia)		*-nõtaɹ-		
387	'brain, head'	*-nõːtsiː-			
388	'breast, milk'	*-nõʔt-			
389	'fungus, mushroom'		*-nɹahs-		
390	'leaf'		*-nɹaht-		
391	'get involved, help'	*-nsteːɹ-			
392	'corn husk'	*-nuːɹ-			
393	'be difficult, be unable to, fail to do'	*-nuːɹõ-			
394	'winter, year'		*-ohsɹ-		
395	'throw' (limited to Iroquoia)		*-ojʔaːk-		
396	'split'		*-oɹẽ-		
397	'be, be standing, exist, stand upright'		*-oːt		
398	'be at the end, end'		*-oʔkt-		
399	'dig' (limited to Iroquoia)		*-oʔkʷaːt-		
400	'hand'	*-oʔnj-			
401	'be of a kind, be of a sort'		*-oʔtẽːh		
402	'earth, land, world'		*-õhwẽtsj-		
403	'go beyond, go through, leak, pass through, penetrate, reach'	*-õːkuːh-			
404	'sift'	*-õːkuːhst-			
405	'be a person, human being'		*-õkʷeh, *-õkʷehsɹ-, *-õkʷeʔt-		
406	'be alive, life, live'	*-õːnh-			
407	'rain'		*-õnoːt-		
408	'pot'	*-õːt-			
409	'put into the fire'	*-õːt-			
410	'be attached, have as a body part'		*-õːt		
411	'remove from the fire'	*-õːtakʷ-			
412	'be a lake, lake'	*-õːtaɹiʔ			
413	'be in, be on'		*-ɹ-		
414	'moon to be present, planet to be present, sun to be present'		*-ɹ-		
415	'moon, planet, sun'		*-ɹahkʷ-		
416	'erase, rub out, wipe out'		*-ɹakew-		
417	'choose, pick out, select'		*-ɹako-, *-ɹakw-		
418	'sap, syrup'		*-ɹan-		
419	'heel'		*-ɹat-		
420	'climb'		*-ɹathẽ-, *-ɹaʔthẽ-		
421	'adhere, stick, stick on'		*-ɹaʔnẽtaːk-		
422	'incantation, song, spell, witchcraft'		*-ɹẽn-		
423	'bush, forest, woods'		*-ɹhat-		
424	'coat with, put on'			*-ɹho-	
425	'be paternal aunt to'	*-ɹhok			
426	'socks, leggings'	*-ɹiː-			
427	'affair, business, thing, matter'		*-ɹihw-		
428	'fight, kill'		*-ɹijo-, *-ɹjo-		
429	'animal'		*-ɹjoːʔ		
430	'blue, sky'		*-ɹõhj-		
431	'log, tree'		*-ɹõt-		
432	'chop'		*-ɹʔo-, *-ɹʔok-		
433	'be present, exist'		*-t-		
434	'and, besides'			*tahnũʔ	
435	'run'		*-takh-		
436	'woodpecker'	*taɹaːɹ			
437	'flint'	*tawiːhskaɹaʔ			
438	'two'		*tekniːh		
439	'eight'		*tekɹõʔ		
440	'change'		*-teni-, *-tenj-		
441	'mosquito'	*-tẽːhs-			
442	'alternate, differ'		*-tih-		
443	'skunk'	*tiʔɹ			
444	'nearby'				tjohskẽẽʔ
445	'snake'				tjoʔxjẽtsihk
446	'decay, rot, spoil'	*-tkẽː-			
447	'how, how many, how much' (limited to Iroquoia)		*toːh		
448	'be certain, be exact, be true'		*-tokẽːh		
449	'stand'	*-toʔn-			
450	'bluejay' (limited to Iroquoia)		*tɹiʔtɹiːʔ		
451	'beans'		*tsaheʔ, *-tsaheʔt-		
452	'bottle, gourd, jar'		*-tsheʔ, *-tsheʔt-, *-tsheʔw-		
453	'club, fist, knot'		*-tsihkʷ-		
454	'robin'	*tsiːhskʷoːʔkʷoːʔ			
455	'otter, seal'	*tsiːjẽh			
456	'salt'		*-tsikheʔt-		
457	'be male'		*-tsin		
458	'fire'	*-tsiːɹ			
459	'coal, ember, fire, spark'		*-tsist-		
460	'fox, lynx'		*tsitshoʔ		
461	'bile, green, yellow'		*-tsiʔnkʷaɹ-		
462	'bird'		*tsiʔtẽʔ		
463	'corn tassel'	*-tsiːʔtsiːʔ			
464	'seven'		*tsjatahk		
465	'tobacco'	*-tsjoːɹ-			
466	'six; seven'		*tsjotaɹeʔ		
467	'fish'	*-tsjõʔt-			
468	'be daughter-in-law'	*-tsoʔ			
469	'dream, sleep'		*-tsɹẽht-		
470	'put into the water'	*-uː-			
471	'remove from the water'	*-uːkʷ-			
472	'cover'	*-uːɹ-			
473	'splash water, sprinkle'	*-uːtsɹ-			
474	'whippoorwill'	*waʔkuhɹiːʔ			
475	'say, speak'	*-we-			
476	'language, voice, word'		*-wẽn-		
477	'thumb' (limited to Iroquoia)		*-whjõhkaɹ-		
478	'young person'	*-wiːnõːh			
479	'baby, child, infant, offspring'		*-wiɹ-		
480	'arm, fin, wing'		*-wj-		
481	'wing'			*-wjahũtsh-	
482	'learn, teach'		*-wjẽhst-		
483	'know how, learn how'		*-wjẽhw-, *-wjẽw-, *-wjẽʔ-		
484	'craft, manner, skill, way'		*-wjẽn-		
485	'become capable, learn how'			*-wjʌ̃tehtaʔ-	
486	'be good'	*-wohst			
487	'air, wind'		*-wɹ-		
488	'arrow'	*-ʔn-			
489	'bone'		*-ʔnẽj-		
490	'egg'		*-ʔnhõhs-		
491	'mind, spirit'		*-ʔnikõhɹ-		
492	'be late, delay'		*-ʔnitsko-, *-ʔnitskʷ-		
493	'escape, flee, run away'		*-ʔnjakẽʔ-		
494	'nose'	*-ʔnjõːhs-			
495	'be envious, be jealous, envy'		*-ʔnonsh-		
496	'be powerful, be strong'		*-ʔnshanst-		
497	'drown, fall into water'		*-ʔtskoʔ-		
498	'drag, drive, pull, ride'		*-ʔtsɹ-		
