= Nanzatico =

Archaeological site in Virginia, United States

- Nanzattico Archeological Site
- Formerly listed on the U.S. National Register of Historic Places
- Nearest city: Index, Virginia
- Area: 15 acres (6.1 ha)
- NRHP reference No.: 03001091

Significant dates
- Added to NRHP: October 23, 2003
- Removed from NRHP: November 10, 2003

The Nanzatico (Nantaughtacund) community was a group of Native Americans that included remnants of earlier tribes displaced by English settlers in and around King George County, Virginia. The group was made up of Portobagos from Maryland, Patawomecks from the Northern Neck area, Matchotics, and Rappahannock tribe members along with others. The original Nantaughtacund were noted by that name living on the Rappahannock River by John Smith on 1608, represented on his map as a "king's house".

They occupied land on opposite sides of the Rappahannock in present-day Caroline and King George counties. The town of Nanzemond was recorded by 1654, and the towns of Warisquock and Ausaticon in 1655. The Portobacco town was south of the river, about where Smith's "king's house" was shown. The only surviving deed for a land sale by the tribe was signed by their weroance Attamahune in 1662. The Matchotic (Mattehatique) formed a section of them on the 1669 census. In that census, the Nanzatico counted fifty bowmen, and the Portobacco sixty. In 1680, the weroance Pattanochus signed onto an annexe of the 1677 Treaty of Middle Plantation for both groups. In 1684, the Colony ordered the 70 total remaining Rappahannock to join with the Portobacco, for their protection against Seneca Iroquois raids. These groups were allied with the Doeg tribe, who held land just upriver in Caroline as late as 1720. In the 1697 census, both the Nanzatico and Portobacco groups were counted together with 40 bowmen, and in 1702 they had 30 bowmen between them.

In April 1704, the Nanzatico complained to the House of Burgesses that English settlers were encroaching onto their remaining enclave, on both sides of the river. These complaints were never acted upon by the Virginia Colony, and on August 30, a war party of ten Nanzatico men killed one of the encroaching settlers, John Rowley, and his family. A company of the Richmond County militia hunted down and captured 49 Nanzaticos and tried them for murder. Five men were hanged for the murder, and all the other Nanzaticos over age 12 were sold into slavery in the West Indies under a 1665 law that held communities responsible for any murders of English settlers. Children were forced to work as servants for officials of the Virginia Colony.

The affiliated Portobacco / Rappahannock tribe were not deported at this time, and were noted by Robert Beverley in 1705 as living north of the river with five bowmen. The name Nanzatico means warrior chief.
