= Cheroenhaka (Nottoway) Indian Tribe =

State-recognized tribe in Virginia, United States

- Named after: Nottoway people
- Type: state-recognized tribe, nonprofit organization
- Tax ID no.: EIN 34-2005753
- Purpose: A23: Cultural, Ethnic Awareness
- Location: Franklin, Virginia, United States
- Chairman: Walter D. Brown
- Revenue: $30,957 (2020)
- Expenses: $12,815 (2020)
- Funding: grants, contributions
- Staff: 0 (2020)
- Website: www.cheroenhaka-nottoway.org

The Cheroenhaka (Nottoway) Indian Tribe is a state-recognized tribe and nonprofit organization in Virginia. The organization identifies as descending from Nottoway people. They are not federally recognized as a Native American tribe.

The name Cheroenhaka is the autonym for Nottoway people.

== State-recognition ==
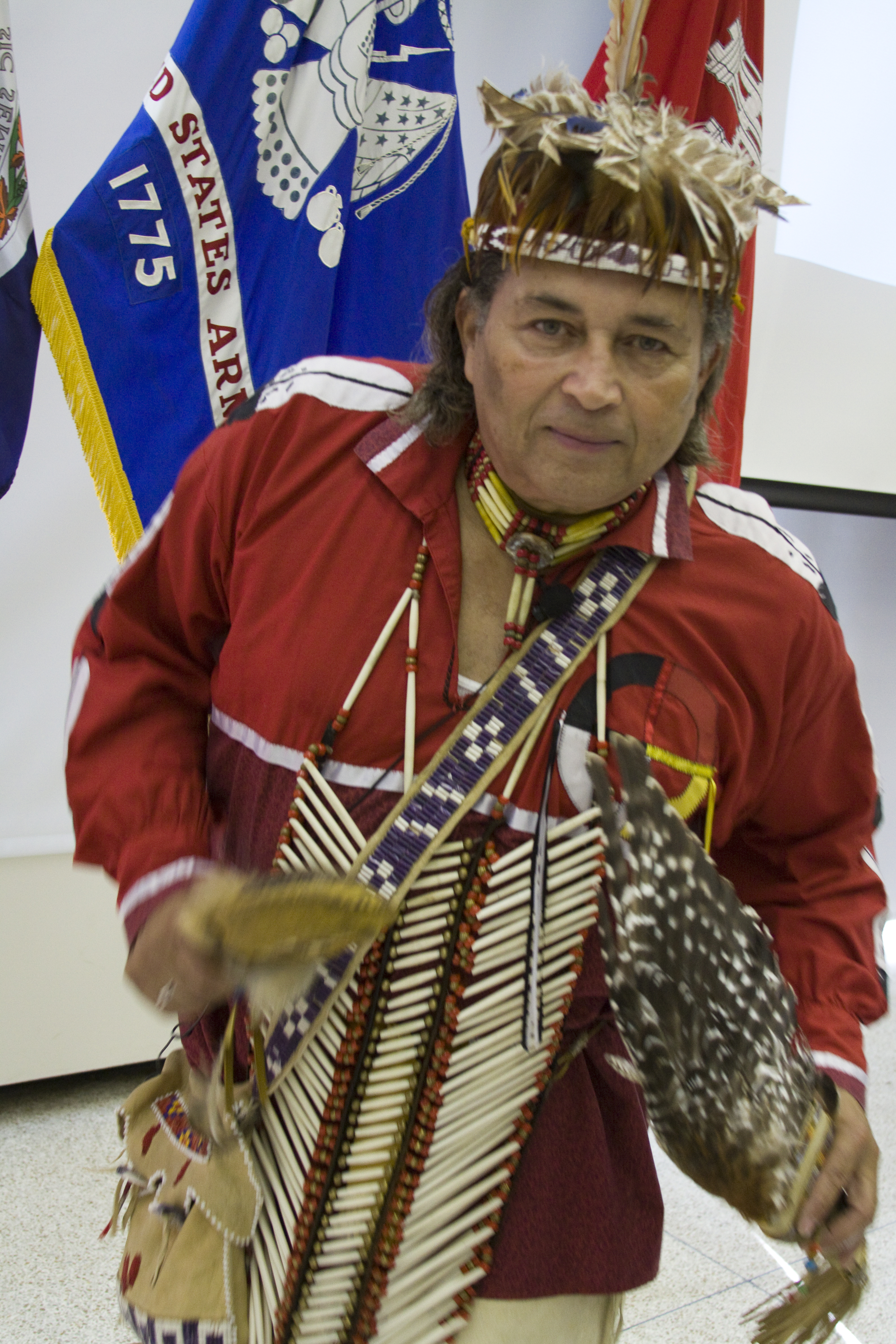
Chief Walter D. "Red Hawk" Brown III of the Cheroenhaka (Nottoway) Indian Tribe

Scholar Arica C. Coleman writes that in the eight years of leadup to their recognition, the Cheroenhaka (Nottoway) of Southampton, Virginia (CITOSV) refused to file a petition for recognition. She says they submitted a resolution at the last minute when the Nottoway Indian Tribe of Virginia (NITV) were applying for recognition, and piggybacked them to gain state recognition.

The Commonwealth of Virginia recognized the CITOSV as a tribe in 2010, when they state recognized the NITV. The majority of tribes in the Virginia Council on Indians (VCI) left the council in protest of the recognition, and the council dissolved. Scholar Samuel R. Cook wrote he was disturbed the legislators dismissed the VCI's requests for better documentation of the tribe before recognition.

=== Discussion ===
Coleman writes that the CITOSV and NITV are unrelated organizations, in opposition to legislators who assumed they were splinter organizations. She says the identity of the CITOSV was assumed, unlike the NITV which had been genealogically validated, and that the CITOSV had never submitted their genealogy to be reviewed.

== Organization ==
The group formed Cheroenhaka (Nottoway) Indian Tribal Heritage Foundation, a 501(c)(3) nonprofit organization in 2005, with the mission to "Educational, charitable and religious. Educational, charitable, and religious." In 2020, the nonprofit held $468,180 in assets and had no employees.

The chief is Walter "Red Hawk" Brown of Courtland, Virginia.
