= Nottoway Indian Tribe of Virginia =

State-recognized tribe in Virginia, United States

- Named after: Nottoway people
- Formation: 26 January 2006
- Founded at: Franklin, Virginia
- Type: state-recognized tribe, nonprofit organization
- Tax ID no.: Foundation: EIN 94-3433830
- Location: Franklin, Virginia, United States
- Chairman: Lynette Lewis Allston
- Subsidiaries: Virginia Nottoway Indian Circle and Square Foundation Incorporated
- Website: nottowayindians.org

The Nottoway Indian Tribe of Virginia is a state-recognized tribe and nonprofit organization in Virginia. The organization identifies as descending from Nottoway people. They are not federally recognized as a Native American tribe.

== State-recognition ==
The Commonwealth of Virginia recognized the Nottoway Indian Tribe of Virginia as a tribe in 2010. The state also recognized the Cheroenhaka (Nottoway) Indian Tribe.

== Organization ==
The group formed Nottoway Indian Tribe of Virginia, Inc., a 501(c)(3) nonprofit organization in 2006.

The agent for the organization is Crystal Joyner of Franklin, Virginia. The administration includes:

- Director: Archie Elliott Jr., Lynette Lewis Allston
- Chair: Lynnette Lewis Allston
- Vice-chair: Archie Elliott Jr.
- Officer: Asphy S. Turner, William Wright.

In 2009, they organized the Virginia Nottoway Indian Circle and Square Foundation Incorporated, another nonprofit organization based in King William, Virginia. Their principal officer Asphy S. Turner.

Lynette Lewis Allston is the chief of the state-recognized tribe, based in Capron, Virginia.

== Activity ==
Nottoway Indian Tribe of Virginia host an annual powwow in Surry, Virginia.
