= Meherrin =

Indigenous people

Kauwets'a:ka
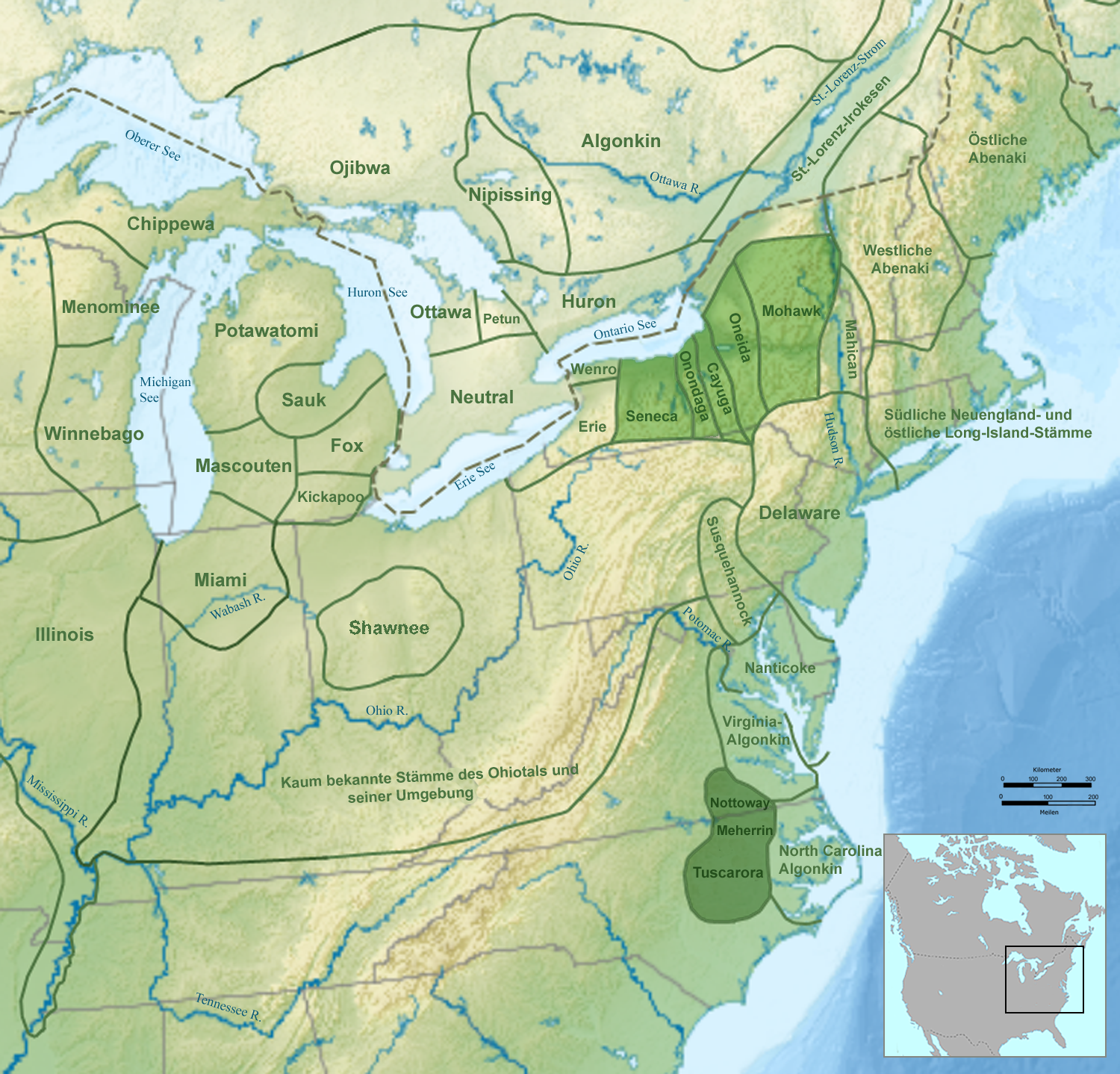
- Meherrin, Tuscarora, and Nottway territory prior to 1700 CE

Regions with significant populations
- North Carolina, Virginia

Languages
- English, formerly Meherrin language

Related ethnic groups
- Tuscarora people, Nottoway people

The Meherrin people were an Indigenous people of the Northeastern Woodlands, who spoke an Iroquian language. They lived between the Piedmont and coastal plains at the border of Virginia and North Carolina. Many Meherrin migrated north and joined the Haudenosaunee Confederacy, eventually fleeing the Sullivan Expedition and settling in Canada on the Six Nations of the Grand River reserve with their compatriots.

The Meherrin Indian Tribe is a state-recognized tribe in North Carolina.

== Name ==
The meaning of Meherrin is unknown. Their name was first written as Maharineck. It was also spelled Maherin, Maherring, Meherries, Meherron, and Menchaerink.

The Meherrin Indian Tribe says their autonym is Kauwets'a:ka, which translates to "People of the Water." In the related Tuscarora language, they are known as Akawęčˀá·ka·ˀ.

== Language ==
The Meherrin spoke the Meherrin language, which is most likely an Iroquian language. This designation is based on their close relationships to the Iroquoian-speaking Tuscarora and Nottoway. Linguistic evidence indicates that these three groups share a common ancestry and likely all spoke the same Iroquoian language or similar dialects. Tuscarora oral history also indicates common origins.

== History ==
=== 17th century ===
American anthropologist James Mooney estimated that the Mehirren population was 700 in 1600. They lived in dispersed villages, where they farmed, hunted, and gathered wild foods. British colonist Edward Bland encountered the Meherrin in 1650 and first wrote about them. Their village Cowinchahawkon was on an early British trade route. A 1669 Virginia Indian census said they had two villages and 50 fighting men, for an estimated total of 180 Meherrin. By 1675, they had absorbed Susquehanna refugees fleeing Pennsylvania. In 1681 they moved south to the banks of the Meherrin River.

=== 18th century ===
In 1705 the Virginia Colony established a reservation for the Meherrin at Maherrin Neck (later renamed Manley's Neck), in an area claimed by both Virginia and Carolina. It was finally assigned to Carolina, and in 1706 Carolina ordered the Meherrin out of her territory, threatening violence to expel them. The Meherrin asked for more time, a year in order to harvest their crops, and asked for help from the Virginia colonists to make their case. Virginia took their side in the quarrel, but in August 1707 Carolinian official Thomas Pollock, leading a troop of 60 men, attacked Meherrin Town, destroying crops, homes, and all belongings; his forces seized 36 men, depriving them of water for two days. In September the Virginia militia met with the chiefs, promising Virginia's protection to prevent them from retaliating against Carolina. Col. Edmond Jennings, Virginia Council President, wrote a harsh reprimand to leaders of Carolina.

From 1711 to 1712, the Meherrin allied with the Tuscarora against British colonists in the Carolinas and their Indian allies during the Tuscarora War. In 1713, they delivered two of their paramount chief's sons as hostages to be kept by the colonists at the College of William & Mary in Williamsburg, Virginia to ensure that they would keep the peace. In 1720 they made a treaty of peace with the Susquehanna.

In 1717, the Meherrin were given a reservation along the western shore of lower Chowanoc River, not far from its mouth in Albemarle Sound, near modern Colerain (Bertie County, N.C.). At the time, Governor Charles Eden thought that the reservation only contained 10,000 acres, but Surveyor Col. Edward Moseley later discovered that the reservation contained more than 40,000 acres.

In 1723, the Virginia Colony confirmed the Meherrin's right to the reservation land and severely criticized North Carolina for illegally taking Meherrin land. Most of the Tuscarora were driven off after many were killed and taken captive in the above war. The North Carolina authorities reviewed petitions from both the Meherrin and British colonists squatting on their land.

The Meherrin became tributaries of the Province of North Carolina in 1726. The British colonists established a reservation in what is now Hertford County, North Carolina. The 7-square-mile reservation was located between the Meherrin River and the Chowan River. The Province of North Carolina confirmed in a treaty that the reservation land belonged to the Meherrin.

In 1731, fewer than 20 surviving Meherrin families lived east of the Chowan River in North Carolina. They moved to what is now Northampton County, North Carolina by 1755, when only 8 fighting men were recorded.

By 1761, an estimated 20 Meherrin fighting men and their families lived along the Roanoke River, along with Saponi, Tuscarora, and Machapunga people. According to the Bureau of Indian Affairs' Office of Federal Acknowledgement, the Meherrin were last identified in North Carolina in 1763. By 1768 their reservation had been dissolved. They likely migrated north with the last Tuscarora citizens in 1802 to join their relatives in the Haudenosaunee Confederacy.

== Modern identification ==
The State of North Carolina designated the Meherrin Indian Tribe as state-recognized tribe in 1986. Researcher Andre Kearns states some descendants of the early free African-American Cumbo family later adopted Native American identity, self-identifying as Meherrin.
