= Nottoway people =

Native American tribe in Virginia, US

Nottoway
Cheroenhaka
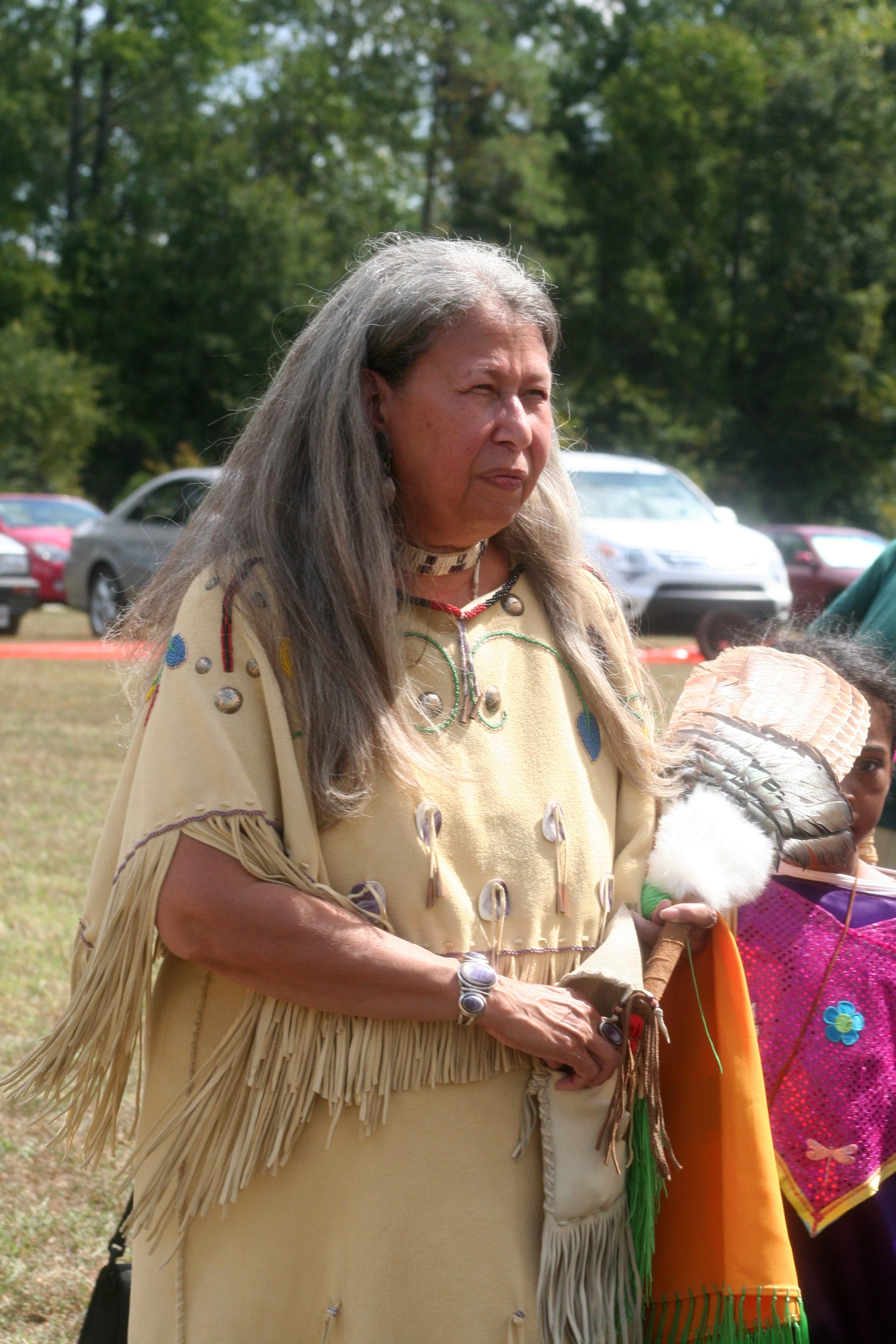
- Chief Lynette Allston, of the Nottoway Tribe of Virginia.

Regions with significant populations
- Virginia

Languages
- English, Nottoway (historical)

Related ethnic groups
- Nansemond, Weyanock, Meherrin, Tuscarora

The Nottoway (Nottoway: Cheroenhaka, also Nottaway) are an Iroquoian Native American tribe in Virginia. The Nottoway spoke the Nottoway language, a member of the Iroquoian language family.

== Names ==
The term Nottoway may derive from Nadawa or Nadowessioux (widely translated as "poisonous snake"), an Algonquian-language term.

Frank Siebert suggested that the term natowewa stems from Proto-Algonquian *na:tawe:wa and refers to the Massasauga, a pit viper of the Great Lakes region. The extension of the meaning as "Iroquoian speakers" is secondary. In Algonquian languages beyond the geographical range of the viper (i.e. Cree–Innu–Naskapi and Eastern Algonquian), the term's primary reference continues to focus on *na:t- 'close upon, mover towards, go after, seek out, fetch' and *-awe: 'condition of heat, state of warmth,' but no longer refers to the viper.

A potential etymology in Virginia of *na:tawe:wa (Nottoway) refers to *na:t- 'seeker' + -awe: 'fur,' or literally 'traders' The earliest colonial Virginia reference to "Nottoway" also frames Algonquian/Iroquoian exchanges in terms of trade: roanoke (shell beads) for skins (deer and otter).

The Algonquian speakers also referred to the Nottoway, Meherrin and Tuscarora people (also of the Iroquoian-language family) as Mangoak or Mangoags, a term which English colonists used in their records from 1584 to 1650. This term, Mengwe or Mingwe, was used by the Dutch and applied to the Iroquoian Susquehannock ("White Minquas") and Erie people ("Black Minquas").

The name Cheroenhaka is an autonym for Nottoway people. The meaning of the name Cheroenhaka (in Tuscarora: Čiruʼęhá·ka·ʼ) is uncertain. (It has been spelled in various ways: Cherohakah, Cheroohoka or Tcherohaka.) The linguist Blair A. Rudes analyzed the second element as -hakaʼ meaning "one or people who is/are characterized in a certain way." He conjectured that the first element of the name was related to the Tuscarora term čárhuʼ (meaning "tobacco", as both tribes used this product in ceremonies). The term has also been interpreted as "People at the Fork of the Stream".

== Language ==
The Nottoway language is an Iroquoian language. It became extinct well before 1900. At the time of European contact in 1650, speakers numbered only in the hundreds. From then until 1735, a number of colonists learned the language and acted as official interpreters for the Colony of Virginia, including Thomas Blunt, Henry Briggs, and Thomas Wynn. These interpreters also served the adjacent Meherrin, as well as the Nansemond, who spoke Nottoway in addition to Nansemond. The last two interpreters were dismissed in 1735 since the Nottoway by then were using English.

By 1820, three elderly people still spoke Nottoway. In that year John Wood collected over 250-word samples from one of these, Chief Edith Turner (Nottoway, ca. 1754–1838). He sent them to Thomas Jefferson, who shared them with Peter Stephen Du Ponceau. In their correspondence, these two men quickly confirmed that the Nottoway language was of the Iroquoian language family. Several additional words, for a total of about 275, were collected by James Trezvant after 1831 and published by Albert Gallatin in 1836.

In the early 20th century, John Napoleon Brinton Hewitt (1910) and Hoffman (1959) analyzed the Nottoway vocabulary in comparison with Tuscarora and found them closely related.

== History ==
=== 17th century ===
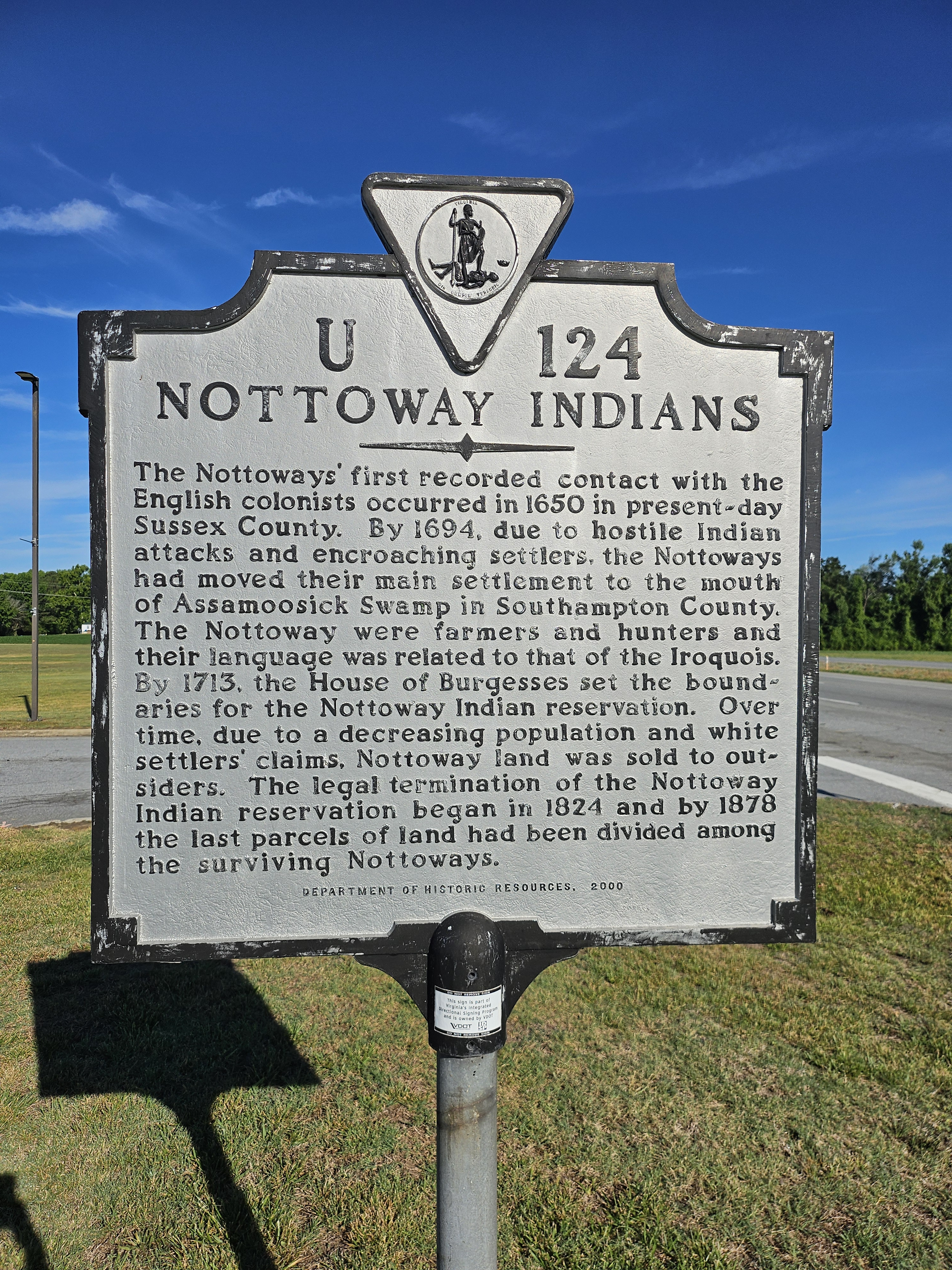
Historical marker in Franklin, Virginia with Nottoway history

The Nottoway, like their close neighbors, the Meherrin and Tuscarora, lived just west of the Fall Line in the Piedmont region. English explorer Edward Bland is believed to have been the first European to encounter them when he made an expedition from Fort Henry. He noted meeting them in his journal on August 27, 1650. At the time, the Nottoway numbered no more than 400 to 500. Bland visited two of their three towns, on Stony Creek and the Rowantee Branch of the Nottoway River, in what is now Sussex County. These towns were led by the brothers Oyeocker and Chounerounte.

A Nottoway representative signed the Treaty of Middle Plantation of 1677 in 1680, establishing the tribe as a tributary to the Virginia colony. English squatters continued to encroached on their lands regardless.

By 1681, warfare forced the Nottoway to relocate southward to Assamoosick Swamp in modern Surry County. In 1694 they fled again, to the mouth of a swamp in what is now Southampton County. Around this time, they adopted the remnants of the Weyanoke, an Algonquian-speaking tribe.

The Nottoway suffered high fatalities from epidemics of new Eurasian diseases, such as measles and smallpox, to which they had no natural immunity. They contracted the diseases from European contact, as these diseases were by then endemic among Europeans. Warfare and encroaching colonists also reduced the population.

=== 18th century ===
Remnants of the Nansemond and Weyanock joined the Nottoway in the early 18th century. In 1705, the Nottoway may have numbered 400, based on colonial historian Robert Beverley Jr.'s observations.

In 1711, two young Nottoway men attended the College of William and Mary. After the Tuscarora War (1711–1715), Tuscarora people migrated north, where they became the sixth nation in the Haudenosaunee Confederacy, and some Nottoway left with them.

The Nottoway who remained in Virginia signed a treaty with the British in 1713, that secured two small tracts of land within their historical territory. They sold the smaller of the two tracts in 1734. In 1744, they sold 5,000 acres of their remaining land, followed by sales in 1748 and 1756.

By 1772, only 35 Nottoway lived on their land, of which they leased half. At the end of the 19th century, the Weyanock were adopted completely into the Nottoway, with the surnames Wynoake and Wineoak appearing on public documents. When the tribe sold more land in 1794, the Nottoway consisted of 7 men and 10 women and children.

=== 19th century ===
From 1803 to 1809, Southampton County courts heard a protracted land dispute. At the time, as historian Helen C. Rountree wrote, "The Nottoway had no formally organized government. European-American trustees tasked with overseeing tribal issues were charged with drafting bylaws for the tribe. Tribal members married European-American and African-American spouses.

In 1808, there were only 17 surviving Nottoway, including Billy Woodson and Edith Turner, who became a chief. They owned 3,900 acres and cultivated 144 acres of corn. Turner, who ran a successful farm on the reservation, successfully advocated for four Nottoway orphans to return to the tribe.

In 1818, tribal members petitioned the Virginia General Assembly to be allowed to sell almost half of the remaining 3,912 acres of reservation land. The petition stated that there were only 26 Nottoways. By 1821, 30 Nottoways requested termination and for their land to be allotted in fee simple title. The Virginia General Assembly rejected that request and another in 1822. In 1823, Billy Woodson (Nottoway), an educated son of a European-American, requested termination, and in 1824 Virginia passed a law that would gradually terminate its responsibility and allowed remaining Nottoways to request individual allotment of land. Woodson (under the name Bozeman) and Turner applied for their allotment and shares of a fund in 1830. When Turner died in 1838, her estate went to Edwin Turner (Nottoway), whose children owned the last of the Nottoway reservation. While other tribal members received individual land allotments through the years, Turner kept his and purchased more land. The last tribally held land was allotted in 1878. Despite an 1833 Virginia law that stated descendants of English and American Indian people were "persons of mixed blood, not being negroes of mulattos"; however, with the end of the reservation, white Virginians considered them to be "free Negroes because of their African ancestry," as Rountree wrote.

== Culture ==
The tribe depended on the cultivation of staples, such as the Three Sisters, varieties of maize, squash, and beans. The cultivation and processing of crops were typically done by women, who also selected and preserved varieties of seeds to produce different types of crops. The men hunted game and fished in the rivers. They built multi-family dwellings known as longhouses in communities which they protected by stockade fences known as palisades.

The tribe likely had clans, but ethnographer John R. Swanton wrote, "the fact cannot be established."

In the early 18th century, Nottoway girls wore wampum necklaces.

== State-recognized tribes ==
The state of Virginia recognized two state-recognized tribes, the Nottoway Indian Tribe of Virginia and the Cheroenhaka (Nottoway) Indian Tribe, in February 2010. Neither is federally recognized as a Native American tribe.
