= Nansemond =

Native American tribe

Nansemond Indian Nation
- Domestic dependent nation
- Seal
- Etymology: 'Fishing Point'
- Location in the United States
- Coordinates: 36°50′33.5″N 76°33′30.9″W
- State Recognition: February 20, 1985
- Federal Recognition: January 29, 2018
- Capital: Mattanock Town

Government
  - Type: Tribal Council
  - Chief: Keith Anderson
  - Assistant Chief: Dave Hennaman III

Population
  - Total: 400
- Demonym: Nansemond
- Website: https://nansemond.gov

The Nansemond are the Indigenous nation of the Nansemond River, a 20-mile-long tributary of the James River in Virginia. Nansemond people traditionally lived in settlements on both sides of the Nansemond River where they fished (with the name "Nansemond" meaning "fishing point" in Algonquian), harvested oysters, hunted, and farmed in fertile soil. Today, Nansemond people belong to the federally recognized Nansemond Indian Nation.

Gradually pushed off their lands due to European colonization, the Nansemond struggled to maintain their culture. They reorganized in the late 20th century and gained state recognition from Virginia in 1985. They gained federal recognition in 2018 after Congress passed a bill. Many members of the tribe still live on their ancestral lands in Suffolk, Chesapeake, and surrounding cities.

== Language ==
The Nansemond language is believed to have been Algonquian, similar to that of many other Atlantic coastal tribes. But only six words have been preserved, which are not enough to identify it. The six words, which may have been corrupted in memory by the time they were written down in 1901, are nĭkătwĭn (one), näkătwĭn (two), nikwásăti (three), toisíaw’ (four), mishä́naw (five), and marímo (dog).

== History ==
The Nansemond weroancy was a member of the Powhatan Confederacy, which consisted of about 30 weroancies, estimated to have numbered over 20,000 people in the coastal area of what is called Virginia. The confederacy was led by the Mamanatowick, also known as the Powhatan, and by the weroances of the various weroancies. They lived along the Nansemond River, an area they called Chuckatuck. In 1607, when a group of settlers led by the explorer John Smith arrived on the north side of the James River and established the settlement of Jamestown, the Nansemond were initially wary.

In 1607, the Jamestown settlers began exploring the Nansemond River, following the river's oyster beds. Relationships between the colonists and the Nansemond, already strained due to raids, deteriorated further in 1609 when a group of Jamestown settlers were sent to trade ratchets and copper for food. However, the colonists never returned, prompting the formation of a search party. When the search party encountered some locals, they informed the group that the missing colonists had been sacrificed, with their brains cut and scraped from their skulls using mussel shells. In retaliation, the colonists went to Dumpling Island, where the weroance lived, as well as the location of the 'temple' housing the weroance's sacred items. The raiding party destroyed the burial sites of their weroances, their 'temples' and their sacred items. Houses, known as yehakins, were ransacked for valuables, such as pearls and copper items, which were customarily buried with the bodies of weroances. By the 1630s, colonists started to encroach on Nansemond lands. The two peoples had different perspectives on land ownership.

=== Marriage of John Bass and Elizabeth ===
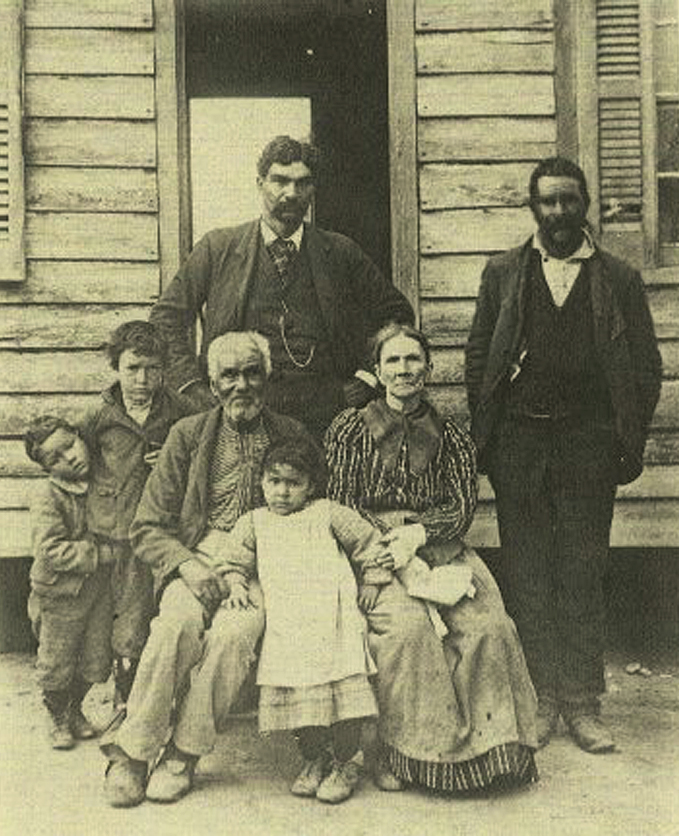
Members of the Nansemond tribe, mostly members of the Weaver and Bass families, c. 1900, Smithsonian Institution

John Bass, a colonist in early 17th-century Virginia, married Elizabeth, the daughter of the leader of the Nansemond Nation. After she was baptized into the established Anglican Church of the colony, they married on August 14, 1638. Bass had been born 7 September 1616; he died in 1699. They had eight children together (Elizabeth, John, Jordan, Keziah, Nathaniel, Richard, Samuel, and William). Although Christianized, Elizabeth likely raised their children in their culture. The Nansemond had a matrilineal kinship system in which the children were considered to be born into their mother's clan and people.

Some Nansemond claim descent from this marriage. Based on her research, Dr. Helen C. Rountree says that all current Nansemond descend from this marriage.

William H. Weaver is sitting; Augustus Bass is standing behind him. The Weaver family were indentured East Indians (from modern-day India and Pakistan) who were free in Lancaster County by about 1710. By 1732 they were "taxables" [note: free blacks (generally free people of color) and Indians (Native Americans) had to pay a tax] in Norfolk County, and taxable "Mulatto" landowners in nearby Hertford County, North Carolina by 1741. By 1820 there were 164 "free colored" members of the family in Hertford County. In the 1830s some registered as Nansemond Indians in Norfolk County. Smithsonian Institution, "Nansemond Indians, ca. 1900."

Due to encroaching colonists throughout the 17th century, the Nansemond had to split apart. Those who had become Christians adopted European manners of living and stayed along the Nansemond River as farmers, still identifying as Nansemond. Those who did not convert, known as the "Pochick," engaged in an unsuccessful war with English colonists in 1644. The survivors of the conflict fled southwest to the Nottoway River, where the House of Burgesses assigned them a reservation. By 1744, they had ceased using the reservation and gone to live with the Nottoway Indians, an Iroquoian-language tribe, on another reservation nearby. The Nansemond sold their reservation in 1792 and were known as "citizen" Indians.

=== Restoration of Mattanock ===
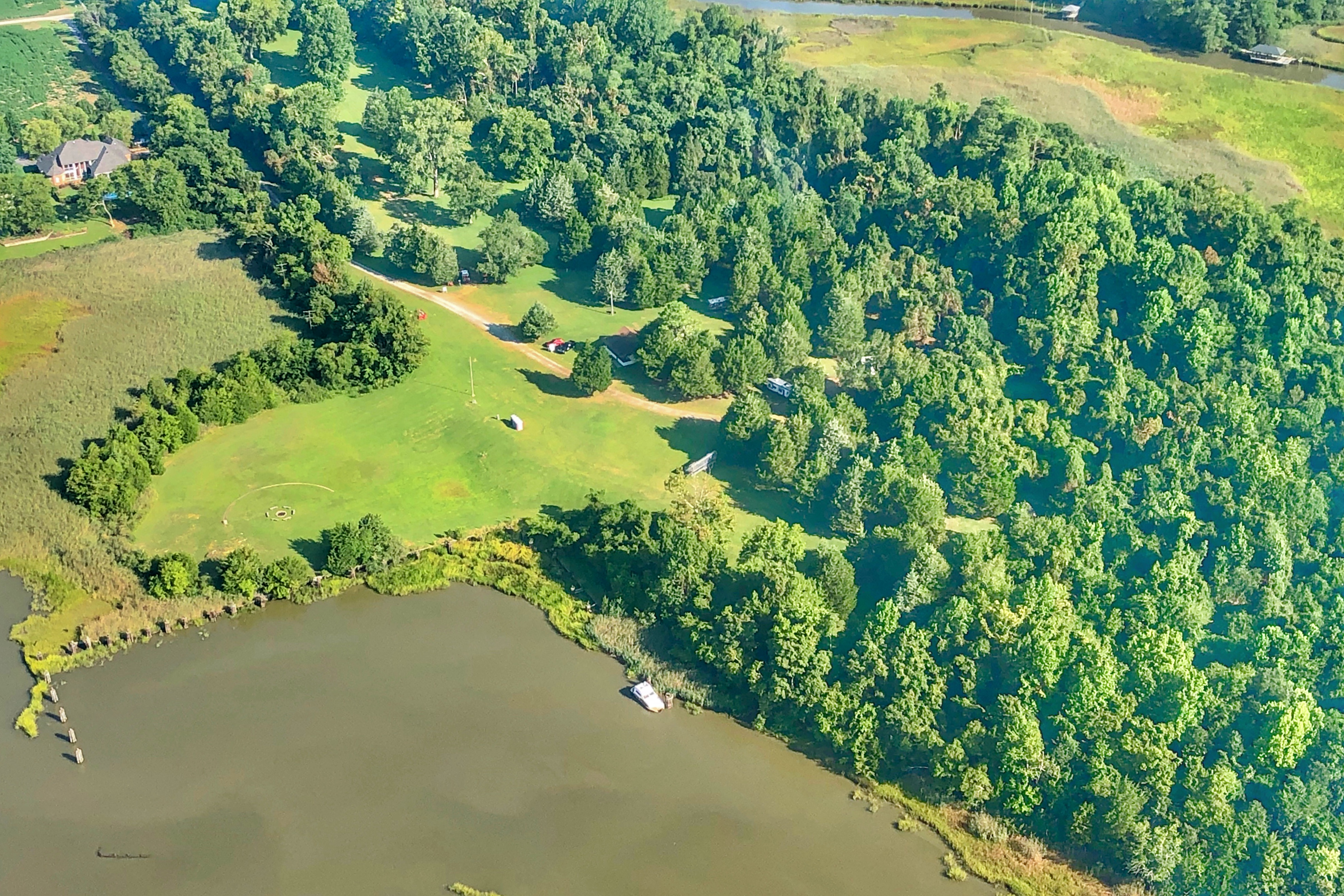
Aerial View of Mattanock the Day After the 31st Annual Nansemond Indian Pow Wow

In 2013, the Nansemond reached an agreement with the City of Suffolk, which transferred about 70 acres (0.28 km^{2}) to them from city-owned riverfront property along the Nansemond River, their ancestral territory.

The agreement was the result of many years of discussion. The City of Suffolk established a task force to consider the project, which supported giving the site to the Nansemond despite being composed mostly of non-Indians. The tribe had to supply detailed plans for the project, including drawings, and they also had to submit documentation to the Mattanock Town task force explaining the type of non-profit foundation that would be created once the deed to the land was given to the tribe. Helen C. Rountree, whose research helped identify the location of Mattanock Town, helped the tribe, which planned to base their reconstruction on archaeological and other research. This would ensure that longhouses and other structures were built accurately to match historical dimensions.

In November 2010, the Suffolk City Council agreed to transfer this land back to the Nansemond. In June 2011, everything stalled because of concerns that the tribe had with the proposed development agreement. In August 2013, the City of Suffolk transferred Nansemond ancestral lands back to the tribe. That November, members of the Nansemond Tribe gathered at the historic site of Mattanock Town and blessed the land.

The tribe planned to use this site to reconstruct the settlement of Mattanock and build a community center, museum, and pow wow ground, among other facilities. They planned to attract tourists by demonstrating their heritage. This project was developed and negotiated between the tribe and the city over more than ten years.

However, the City included a development agreement containing a reverter clause in the land transfer. This clause stated that if the construction of Mattanock Town with a reenactment village for tourist attraction did not happen within five years, the land would revert to the city. In 2018, the Nansemond tribe gained federal recognition with a name change to the Nansemond Indian Nation. Despite having new funding opportunities due to their new status, the Nation was unable to meet the deadline for completing the tourist village requirement, and as a result, the city repossessed the property.

On May 15, 2024, the Suffolk City Council unanimously approved a Memorandum of Understanding (MOU) allowing the transfer of the 71 acres back to the Nation. The Nation also informed the council of a shift in their vision for Mattanock Town to prioritize conservation and education over tourism.

== Description ==
The Nansemond have about 400 tribal members. As a "citizen tribe", they gained state recognition in 1984 and federal recognition in 2018. The current chief is Keith Anderson.

They hold monthly tribal meetings at the Indiana United Methodist Church (which was founded in 1850 as a mission for the Nansemond). The tribe hosts a powwow every year in August. The tribe has also operated a museum and gift shops.

== Federal recognition ==
The Nansemond and other landless Virginia tribes did not gain federal recognition until Congress passed a bill for it in 2018. A bill to recognize six Virginian tribes was introduced into both houses of Congress. It covered the following: the Chickahominy Indian Tribe, Eastern Chickahominy Indian Tribe, Upper Mattaponi Tribe, Rappahannock Tribe, Monacan Indian Nation' and Nansemond Indian Tribe.

These landless tribes had each applied for federal recognition since the late 20th century through the regular process of the Bureau of Indian Affairs, in the Department of Interior. They had difficulty showing cultural and political continuity since the period of their tribes' dealings with the colony and state. In part, this was due to racial discrimination by the European Americans, magnified by Virginia's having been a slave society. As the Nansemond and other tribal peoples intermarried with whites or African Americans, European Americans assumed they were no longer "Indian". But if the mother was Nansemond, she usually raised her children in their tradition. During the early 20th century, Virginia passed a law establishing a binary system of the "one drop rule," requiring each individual to be classified as white or colored (the latter covered anyone with any known African ancestry, regardless of other ancestry or cultural context). Administrators refused to acknowledge families who claimed to be Indian and generally classified them as black, destroying the continuity of records. By contrast, tribal members who were Catholic continued to be registered by churches as Indian for baptisms, marriages, and funerals.

Supporters of these tribes gaining federal recognition proposed a bill in 2003, the "Thomasina E. Jordan Indian Tribes of Virginia Federal Recognition Act". In 2009, supporters again proposed this bill, and by June 2009, the bill passed the House Committee on Natural Resources and the U.S. House of Representatives. A companion bill was sent to the U.S. Senate the day after it was voted on in the House. That bill was sent to the Senate's Committee on Indian Affairs. On October 22, 2009, the Senate committee approved the bill, and on December 23, it was placed on the Senate's Legislative calendar. The bill had a hold placed for "jurisdictional concerns" by Senator Tom Coburn (R-OK), who urged they apply for recognition through the BIA.

However, the Virginia tribes have lost valuable documentation because of the state's passage of the Racial Integrity Act of 1924, requiring the classification of all residents as white or black (colored). As implemented by Walter Plecker, the first registrar (1912–1946) of the newly created Virginia Bureau of Vital Statistics, records of many Virginia-born tribal members were changed from Indian to "colored" because he decided some families were mixed race and was imposing the one-drop rule. After more delays, the bill finally passed in January 2018, and six tribes in Virginia gained federal recognition.
