= Anglo-Powhatan Wars =

17th-century conflicts between Virginia colonists and Algonquian Indians

- Part of the American Indian Wars
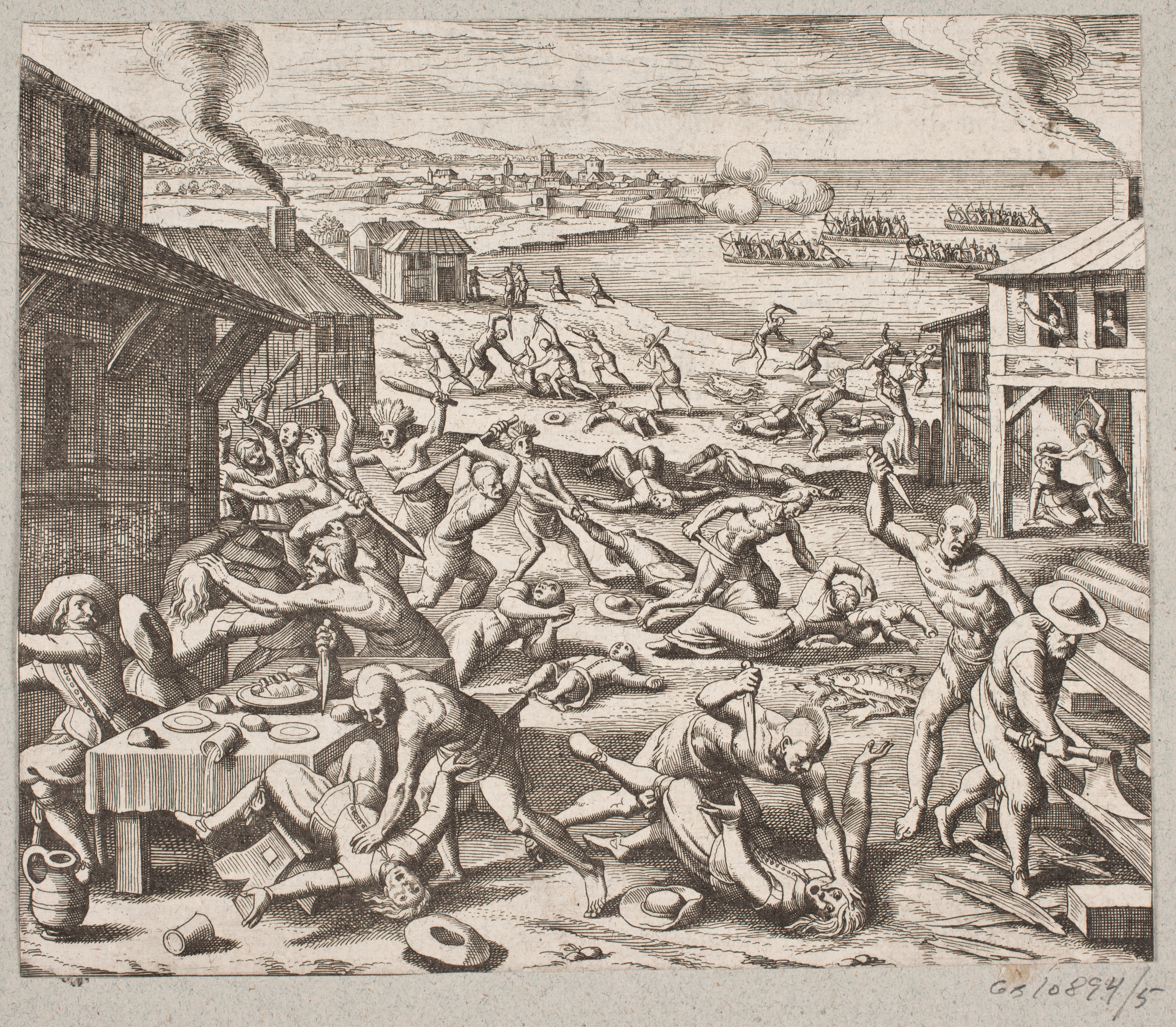
- Matthaeus Merian's 1628 woodcut depicting the massacre of Jamestown and outlying Virginia settlements by the Powhatan Indians on March 22, 1622; based on Theodore de Bry's earlier depictions but with a large degree of conjecture
Date	May 1609 – October 1646
Location	Colony of Virginia
Result	Treaty of Middle Plantation

Belligerents
Colony of Virginia	Powhatan Confederacy

The Anglo–Powhatan Wars were three wars fought between settlers of the Colony of Virginia and the Powhatan Confederacy of Tsenacommacah in the early 17th century. The first war started in 1609 and ended in a peace settlement in 1614. The second war lasted from 1622 to 1632. The third war lasted from 1644 until 1646 and ended when Opechancanough was captured and killed. That war resulted in a defined boundary between the Native Americans and colonial lands that could only be crossed for official business with a special pass. This situation lasted until 1677 and the Treaty of Middle Plantation which established Indian reservations following Bacon's Rebellion.

== Early conflict ==
The settlement at Jamestown, Virginia, was established in May 1607 within the territory of the Powhatan, who were led by Chief Wahunsunacawh, known to the colonists as Chief Powhatan. The area was quite swampy and ill-suited to farming, and Powhatan wanted Captain John Smith and the colonists to forsake the swamp and live in one of his satellite towns called Capahosick where they would make metal tools for him in exchange for full provision.

Smith underestimated the capabilities of the Virginia Indigenous, as they knew the land much better than the colonists. He was reconnoitering the countryside near Powhatan's capital of Orapax in December, only seven months after building the fort on Jamestown Island, when a communal hunting party led by Chief Powhatan's brother Opechancanough captured him. Smith was released in time for New Year's 1608 when he promised to move the colony to Capahosick. He had convinced Powhatan that he was the son of Captain Christopher Newport and that Newport was their head weroance (tribal chief).

By spring 1609, the local Paspahegh tribe had resumed raiding the fort at Jamestown. However, their weroance Wowinchopunk declared an uneasy truce after he was captured and had escaped. Smith had become president of the colony the preceding fall, and he attempted to establish new forts in the territory that summer. He sent a party with Captain John Martin to settle in Nansemond Country. They abandoned the position after 17 men disobeyed orders and were wiped out while trying to buy corn at the Kecoughtan village. Smith also sent 120 men with Francis West to build a fort upriver at the falls of the James, right above the main town of Powhatan at present-day Richmond, Virginia. He purchased the site from Powhatan's son Parahunt, but this ended up faring no better.

Smith was injured in an accidental gunpowder explosion and sailed to England on October 4 for treatment. The settlers established Fort Algernon at Old Point Comfort in the fall of 1609, right beside the Kecoughtan village. In November, Powhatan ambushed and killed Captain John Ratcliffe and 32 other colonists, who had gone to Orapax to buy corn, and the colonists began to starve to death. After being shipwrecked on Bermuda for nearly a year, Thomas Gates finally arrived in late May 1610 with meager and insufficient supplies. Gates saw the state that the colony was in after his arrival due to their lack of food, and decided to evacuate Jamestown on June 7. However, on their second day of sailing, they met Francis West's older brother Thomas West, 3rd Baron De La Warr, coming into the bay equipped with additional colonists, a doctor, food, supplies, and a contingent of 150 armed men. They therefore returned to the fort under De La Warr's command.

De La Warr proved far harsher and more belligerent toward the Indians than any of his predecessors, and his solution was simply to engage in wars of conquest against them, first sending Gates to drive off the Kecoughtans from their village on July 9, then giving Chief Powhatan the ultimatum to either return all colonists and their property or face war. Powhatan responded by insisting that the colonists either stay in their fort or leave Virginia. De la Warr had the hand of a Paspahegh captive cut off and sent him to the Powhatan with another ultimatum: return all colonists and their property or the neighboring villages would be burned. Powhatan did not respond.

== First Anglo–Powhatan War ==
The First Anglo–Powhatan War lasted from 1609 to 1614 between the Powhatans and the colonists. De La Warr sent George Percy and James Davis with 70 men to attack the Paspahegh town on August 9, 1610, burning houses and cutting down cornfields. They killed between 15 and 75 villagers and captured one of Wowinchopunk's wives and her two children. Returning downstream, the colonists threw the children overboard and shot them in the water. Wowinchopunk's wife was executed in Jamestown. The Paspahegh never recovered from this attack and abandoned their town.

A party of colonists was ambushed at Appomattoc in the fall of 1610, and De La Warr managed to establish a company of men at the falls of the James, who stayed there all winter. In February 1611, Wowinchopunk was killed in a skirmish near Jamestown, which his followers avenged a few days later by enticing some colonists out of the fort and killing them. In May, Governor Thomas Dale arrived and began looking for places to establish new settlements; he was repulsed by the Nansemonds but successfully took an island in the James from the Arrohattocs, which became the palisaded fort of Henricus.

Around the time of Christmas 1611, Dale and his men seized the Appomattoc town at the mouth of their river and palisaded off the neck of land, renaming it New Bermudas. The aged Chief Powhatan made no major response to this colonial expansion, and he seems to have been losing effective control to his younger brother Opechancanough during this time, while the colonists strengthened their positions. In December 1612, Captain Samuel Argall concluded peace with the Patawomeck, and he captured Powhatan's daughter Pocahontas. This caused an immediate ceasefire from the Powhatan raids on the colonists, as they held her ransom for peace. In the meantime, settlers had begun to expand south of the rivers, building houses near present-day Hopewell, Virginia.

In early 1609, Jamestown Island had been the only territory under colonial control. By the end of this period, the Powhatans had lost much of their riverfront property along the James; the Kicoughtan and Paspehegh tribes had been effectively destroyed, and the settlers had made major inroads among the lands of the Weyanoke, Appomattoc, Arrohattoc, and Powhatan. The Arrohattoc and Quiockohannock tribes disappear from the historical records after this, possibly indicating that they had been dispersed or merged with other tribes.

== Peace of Pocahontas ==
Peace negotiations stalled over the return of captured hostages and arms for nearly a year; Dale went with Pocahontas and a large force to find Powhatan in March 1614. They were showered with arrows at present-day West Point, so they went ashore and sacked the town. They finally found Powhatan at his new capital in Matchcot, and they concluded a peace that was sealed by the marriage of Pocahontas to colonist John Rolfe. Rolfe and Pocahontas married April 16, 1614 and had their only son 8 months later on January 18, 1615. This was the first known inter-racial union in Virginia and helped to bring a brief period of better relations between the Indians and the colonists. A separate peace was concluded the same year with the Chickahominy tribe which made them honorary "Englishmen" and thus subjects of King James I. This period of peace has been called the peace of Pocahontas.

== Second Anglo-Powhatan War ==
Opechancanough maintained a friendly face to the colony and even met with a Christian minister to give the appearance of his imminent conversion to Christianity. Then, his warriors struck without warning on March 22, 1622, from where they had been planted among the settlements, and killed hundreds in the Indian massacre of 1622. A third of the colony was wiped out that day, and a higher toll would have been taken without last-minute warnings by Christian Indians.

Powhatan war practice was to wait and see what would happen after such a blow was inflicted in the hope that the settlement would simply abandon their homeland and move on elsewhere. However, English military doctrine called for a strong response, and the colonial militia marched out nearly every summer for the next ten years and made assaults on Powhatan settlements. The Accomac and Patawomeck were allied with the settlers and provided them corn while the colonists went to plunder villages and cornfields of the Chickahominy, Nansemond, Warraskoyack, Weyanoke, and Pamunkey in 1622. Opechancanough sued for peace in 1623. The colonists arranged to meet the Indians for a peace agreement but poisoned their wine, fell upon them, shot them, and killed many in revenge for the massacre. The settlers then attacked the Chickahominy, Powhatans, the Appomattocs, Nansemond, and Weyanokes.

In 1624, both sides were ready for a major battle; the Powhatans assembled 800 bowmen with Opechancanough's younger brother Opitchapam leading their force, arrayed against only 60 colonists. The settlers, however, destroyed the Powhatans' cornfields, and the bowmen gave up the fight and retreated. A shortage of gunpowder in the colony delayed the colonists from going on marches in 1625 and 1626. The Indians seem not to have been aware of the shortage and were themselves desperately trying to regroup. However, the summer of 1627 brought renewed assaults against the Chickahominy, Appamattoc, Powhatan proper, Warraskoyak, Weyanoke, and Nansemond.

A peace was declared in 1628, but it was more like a temporary ceasefire since hostilities resumed in March 1629 and continued until a final peace was made on September 30, 1632. The colonists began to expand their settlements on the eastern shore and both sides of the James, as well as south of the York, and they palisaded off the peninsula between the York and James at about Williamsburg in 1633. By 1640, they began claiming land north of the York as well, and Opechancanough leased some land on the Piankatank to settlers in 1642 for the price of 50 bushels of corn per year.

== Palisade ==
By 1634, a palisade (stockade) was completed across the Virginia Peninsula, which was about 6 miles (9.7 km) wide at that point. It provided some security from attacks by the Virginia Indians for colonists farming and fishing. It is partially described in a letter written by Captain Thomas Yonge in 1634 from Jamestown:

a strong palisade… upon a straight between both rivers and… a sufficient force of men to defence of the same, whereby all the lower part of Virginia have a range for their cattle, near forty miles in length and in most places twelve miles (19 km) broad. The pallisades is very near six miles (9.7 km) long, bounded in by two large Creeks. …in this manner to take also in all the ground between those two Rivers, and so utterly excluded the Indians from thence; which work is conceived to be of extraordinary benefit to the country.

== Third Anglo-Powhatan War ==
Twelve years of peace followed the Indian Wars of 1622–1632 before another Anglo–Powhatan War began on April 18, 1644, as the remnants of the Powhatan Confederacy under Opechancanough tried once again to drive out the settlers from the Virginia Colony. Several hundred colonists were killed.

In February 1645, the colony ordered the construction of three frontier forts: Fort Charles at the falls of the James, Fort James on the Chickahominy, and Fort Royal at the falls of the York. In March 1646, the colony built Fort Henry at the falls of the Appomattox, where Petersburg is now located. In August, Governor William Berkeley stormed the village where Opechancanough resided and captured him. All captured males in the village older than 11 were deported to Tangier Island. Opechancanough was taken to Jamestown and imprisoned. Very old and infirm, unable to even move without assistance, Opechancanough died in captivity in October 1646, killed by a settler assigned to guard him. By this time Necotowance had succeeded him as the last chief of the Powhatan Confederacy.

== Treaty of 1646 ==
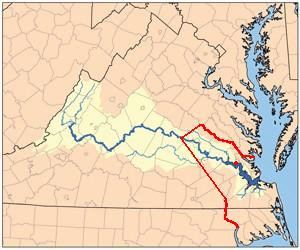
Red line shows boundary between the Virginia Colony and Tributary Indian tribes, as established by the Treaty of 1646; red dot shows Jamestown, capital of Virginia Colony

In October 1646 the General Assembly of Virginia signed a peace treaty with Necotowance which brought the Third Anglo-Powhatan War to an end. In the treaty, the tribes of the confederacy became tributaries to the King of England, paying a yearly tribute to the Virginia governor. At the same time, a racial frontier was delineated between Indian and colonial settlements, with members of each group forbidden to cross to the other side except by a special pass obtained at one of the border forts. The extent of the Virginia Colony open to patent was defined as the land between the Blackwater and York rivers, and up to the navigable point of each of the major rivers. The treaty also permitted settlements on the peninsula north of the York and below the Poropotank, as they had already been there since 1640.

== Aftermath ==
Necotowance remained paramount chief of what was left of the Powhatan Confederacy until his death about 1649. The tribes of the former confederacy however were scattered. When Totopotomoi succeeded Necotowance, it was no longer as paramount chief of the Powhatan but as chief of the Pamunkey. Totopotomoi worked as an ally with the colonial government to maintain peace. In 1656 he died in the Battle of Bloody Run fighting on the side of the colonists against encroaching hostile tribes. His wife Cockacoeske succeeded him. This period of time is often referred to as a time of relative peace between the colonists but it also saw the constant encroachment upon the lands designated to the Indians in the treaty of 1646.

Chief Wahanganoche of the Patawomeck tried to work with the colonists, deeding them tribal lands, but it backfired. In 1662, colonists, wanting more, falsely accused Wahanganoche of murder. Found innocent of all charges by a specially convened session of the House of Burgesses, Wahanganoche was nevertheless murdered by colonists while attempting to return home from his trial. Shortly thereafter the colonial government demanded all Patawomeck 'sell' their land and in 1666 declared war on the Patawomeck, calling for their "extirpation".

The tribes of the Northern Neck of Virginia were effectively wiped out, and the few that managed to escape the settlers were absorbed into other remaining tribes in the region. The peace was shattered further when a small group of Doeg natives murdered two settlers known for mistreating and defrauding natives, and pillaged the general area. This caused a series of escalations and confusions which culminated in Bacon's Rebellion in 1676. This resulted in the Treaty of Middle Plantation signed by Cockacoeske who rallied together other local tribes to sign as well. The treaty set up reservations for each tribe and allowed them hunting rights outside their reservations. It established that all the Indian rulers were equal, with the provision that Cockacoeske was owed the subjection of several scattered groups of Indians.

== See also ==
- List of conflicts in the United States
- History of Virginia
