= Powhatan Confederacy =

Native American Confederacy

- Mid 1500s–1686
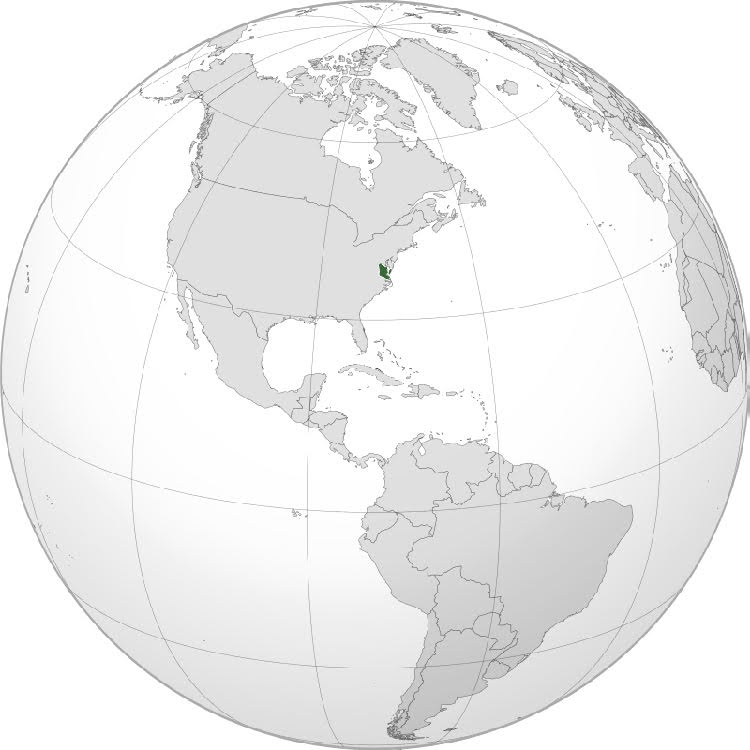
- The Powhatan Confederacy ca. 1607
- Status: Confederation
- Capital: Werowocomoco (late 1500s–1609) Orapakes (1609–1614) Matchut (1614–?)
- Common languages: Powhatan
- Religion: Native American religions
- Demonyms: Mattaponi, Pamunkey, Powhatan, Nansemond, Rappahannock, Weyanoke, Paspahegh, Nantaughtacund
- Mamanatowick
  - Mid 1500s–1618: Wahunsenacawh
  - 1618–1619: Opichapum
  - 1619–1646: Opchanacanough
  - 1646–1655: Necotowance
  - 1646–1656: Totopotomoi
  - 1656–1686: Cockacoeske
- Historical era: Early modern period
  - Wahunsenacawh's mother creates the Powhatan Confederacy: Mid 1500s
  - First Anglo-Powhatan War: 1610-1614
  - Second Anglo-Powhatan War: 1622-1626
  - Third Anglo-Powhatan War: 1644-1646
  - Treaty of 1677: 1677
  - Death of Cockacoeske: 1686
Preceded by
Powhatan
Arrohattoc
Appomattoc
Pamunkey
Mattaponi
Kiskiack
Succeeded by
Pamunkey
Mattaponi
Colony of Virginia
Chickahominy tribe
Rappahannock tribe
Nansemond

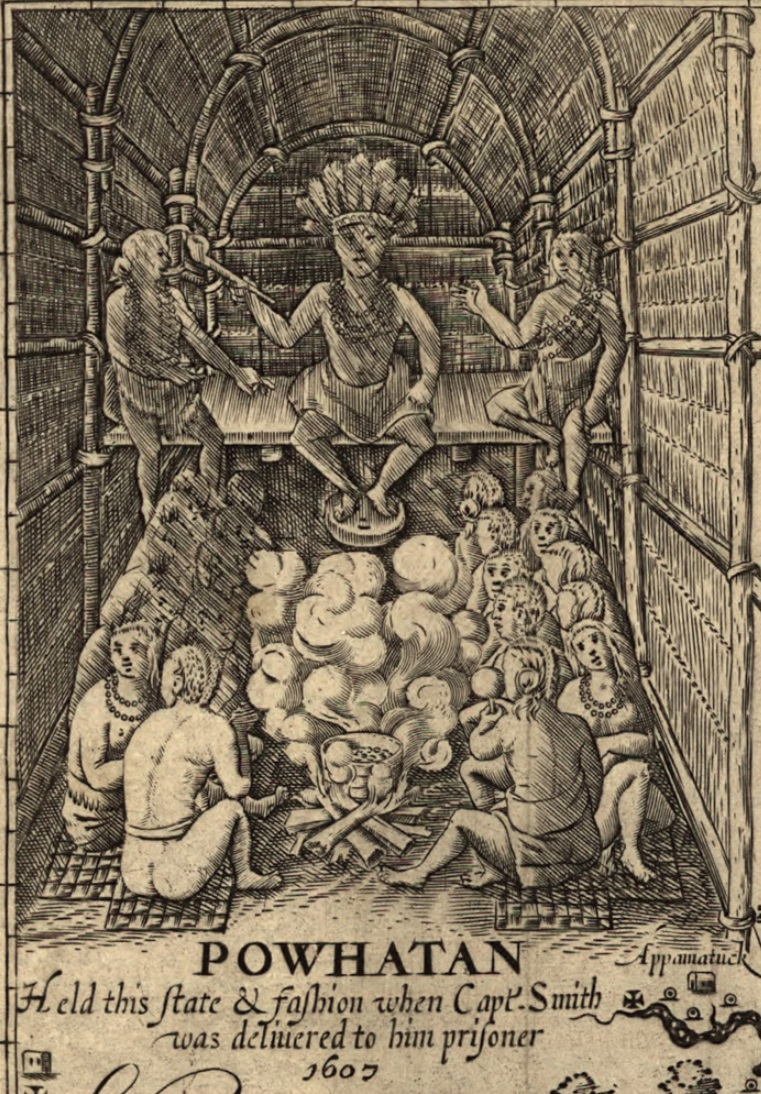
Powhatan in a longhouse at Werowocomoco (detail of John Smith map, 1612)

The Powhatan Confederacy (/ˌpaʊhəˈtæn, paʊˈhætən/ POW-hə-TAN, pow-HAT-ən) was a confederacy of Native American nations in Tsenacommacah, now also called Tidewater Virginia. The confederacy was led by a Mamanatowick and a council of advisors. Meanwhile, each member nation was led by its own sovereign Weroance. Most members of the confederacy likely spoke Algonquian languages.

In 1607, an estimated 14,000 to 21,000 people lived in the confederacy. In the late 16th and early 17th centuries, the confederacy was led by Wahunsenacawh. English colonists used the term Powhatan to refer to Wahunsenacawh. The confederacy expanded to around thirty members at its peak, who joined through marriages, alliances, and wars.

After Wahunsenacawh died in 1618, hostilities with colonists escalated under his brother, Opchanacanough, who unsuccessfully tried to repel encroaching English colonists. By 1700, the confederacy's population had been decimated, by warfare and infectious diseases, such as measles and smallpox that were introduced to North America by the Europeans. At least 75 percent of the Powhatan Confederacy's population died from these diseases in the 17th century alone.

The Commonwealth of Virginia recognizes eight Native American tribes with ancestral ties to the Powhatan Confederacy. The Pamunkey and Mattaponi are the only tribes that have retained reservation lands from the 17th century. Today, many descendants of the Powhatan Confederacy are enrolled in six federally recognized tribes in Virginia. They are:

1. Chickahominy Indian Tribe
2. Chickahominy Indian Tribe–Eastern Division
3. Nansemond Indian Nation
4. Pamunkey Indian Tribe
5. Rappahannock Tribe, Inc.
6. Upper Mattaponi Tribe

== Naming and terminology ==
The name Powhatan, also spelled Powatan, referred to both the capital and the leading nation of the confederacy, sometimes called the Powhatan proper to distinguish them. The English colonists used Powhatan as a title; this usage may be been derived from the name of the Powhatan capital, which was Wahunsenacawh's hometown. Although the specific site of Wahunsenacawh's hometown is unknown, the Powhatan Hill neighborhood in the East End portion of Richmond, Virginia is believed to be near the original town. Tree Hill Farm in Henrico County is also a possible site. English colonial historians also often use it as a title.

Powhata was also the name used by the native people to refer to the river where the town sat at the head of navigation. The English colonists renamed it the James River after King James I. The only water body in Virginia to retain a name related to the Powhatan people is Powhatan Creek, located in James City County, near Williamsburg. Powhatan County and its county seat at Powhatan, Virginia, were honorific names established years later.

== Early history ==
Each member of the Powhatan Confederacy held individual powers over their own lands and each had their own leader known as a Weroance (man) or Weroansqua (woman). As early as the era of John Smith, the various nations were recognized by English colonists as being members of a massive confederacy led by a Mamanatowick.

In 1607, when the first permanent English colonial settlement in North America was founded at Jamestown, the Mamanatowick governed primarily from Werowocomoco, which was located on the northern shore of the York River. Wahunsenacawh had inherited control over six nations from his mother. By 1607, his confederacy had expanded to include more than thirty tribes. The original six tribes inherited by Wahunsenacawh were the Powhatan (proper), the Arrohattoc, the Appamattuck, the Pamunkey, the Mattaponi, and the Chiskiack.

The Kecoughtan joined the confederacy in 1598. Some other members included the Rappahannock, Moraughtacund, Weyanoak, Paspahegh, Quiyoughcohannock, Warraskoyack, and Nansemond. Another tribe from Tsenacommacah was the Chickahominy, who managed to preserve their independence from the confederacy. The Accawmacke, located on the Eastern Shore across the Chesapeake Bay, were nominally a member of the Powhatan Confederacy but enjoyed more autonomy under their own ruler, Debedeavon (aka "The Laughing King"). Around 30,000 people were citizens of the Powhatan Confederacy at the time of European contact; however, by 1677 only five percent of this population remained. The huge death toll was caused by diseases, mass enslavement, and warfare with Europeans.

In his Notes on the State of Virginia (1781–1782), Thomas Jefferson estimated that the Powhatan Confederacy occupied about 8,000 square miles (20,000 km^{2}) of territory, with a population of about 8,000 people, of whom 2,400 were soldiers. Later scholars estimated the total population of the country as 15,000.

=== English settlers in the land of the Powhatan ===
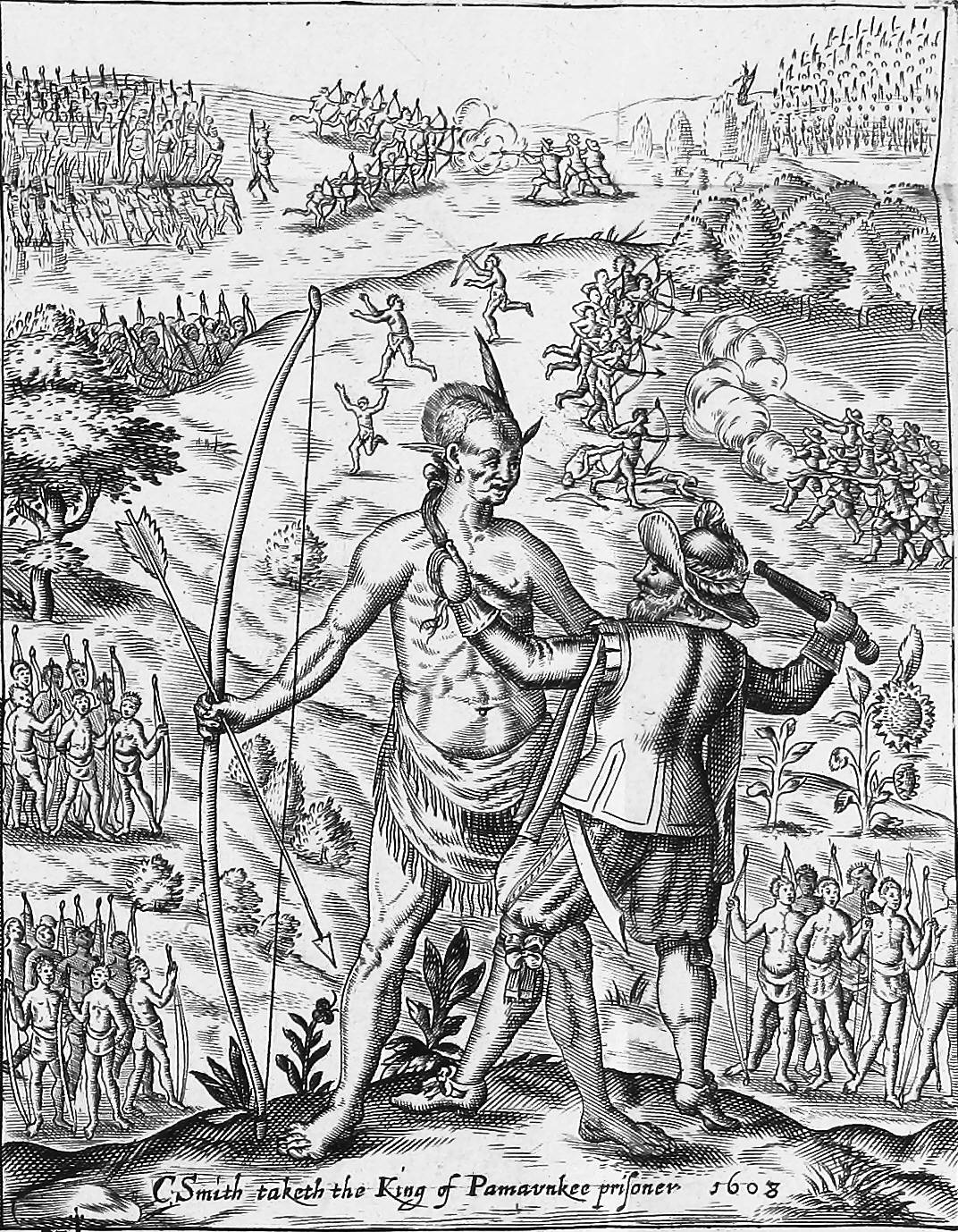
"John Smith taking the King of Pamunkey prisoner" a fanciful image of Opechancanough from Smith's General History of Virginia (1624). The image of Opechancanough is based on a 1585 painting of another native soldier by John White

The lands where the English colonists established Jamestown, their first permanent settlement in North America, were governed by the Powhatan Confederacy. Warfare began immediately because the colonists fired shots as soon as they arrived (due to a bad experience they had with the Spanish before their arrival). Within two weeks of the arrival of English colonists at Jamestown, deaths had occurred.

On a hunting and trade mission on the Chickahominy River in December 1607, Captain John Smith wrote that he fought a small battle with the Opechancanough, and during this battle, he tied his guide to his body as a human shield. Although Smith was wounded in the leg and also had many arrows in his clothing, he was not deathly injured. Soon after, he was captured by the Opechancanough.

After Smith was captured, the Opechancanough prepared him for execution until he gave them a compass, which they saw as a sign of friendliness, so they did not kill him; instead, they took him to a more popular Weroance, followed by a ceremony. Smith was first introduced to Powhatan's brother, who was a Weroance. Later, Smith was introduced to Wahunsenacawh himself. Smith was captured by Opechancanough, the younger brother of Wahunsenacawh. Smith became the first English colonist to meet the Mamanatowick. According to Smith's account, Pocahontas, Powhatan's daughter, prevented her father from executing Smith.

Some researchers have asserted that a mock execution of Smith was a ritual intended to adopt Smith into the tribe, but other modern writers dispute this interpretation, noting that many of Smith's stories do not line up with the known facts. They point out that nothing is known of 17th-century Powhatan adoption ceremonies and that an execution ritual is different from known rites of passage. Other historians, such as Helen C. Rountree, have questioned whether there was any risk of execution. Smith failed to mention this incident in his 1608 and 1612 accounts, only adding it to his 1624 memoir after Pocahontas had become famous.

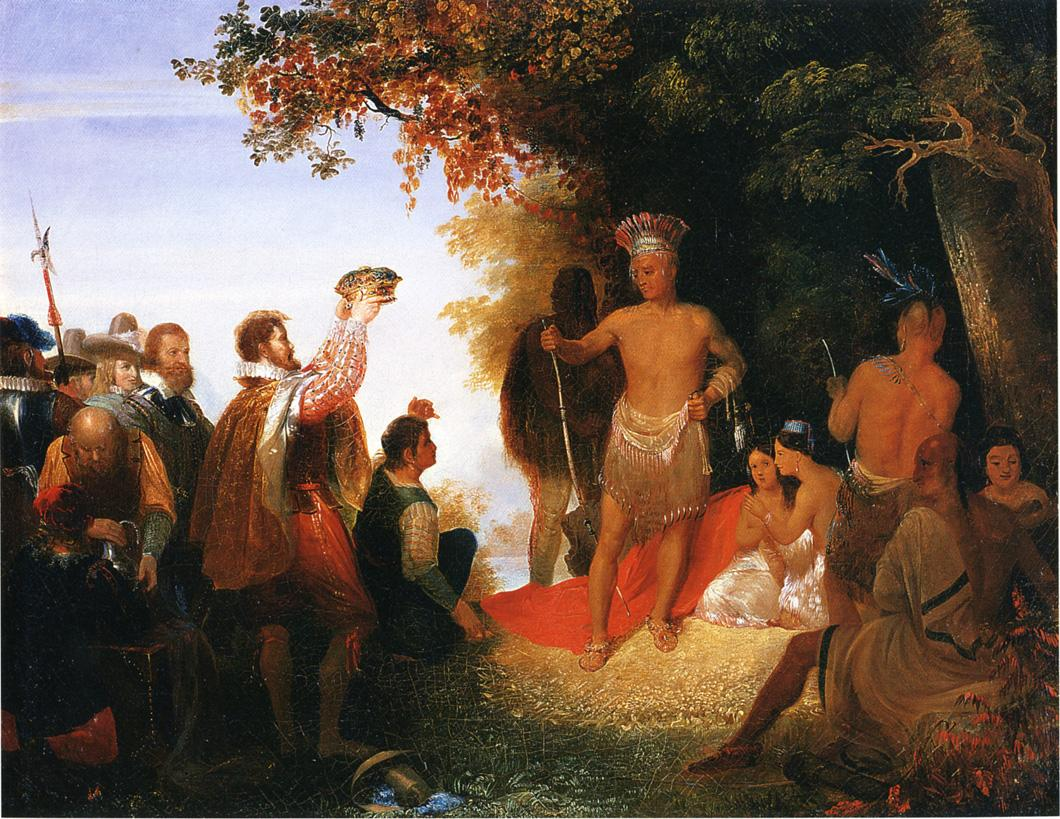
The Coronation of Powhatan, oil on canvas, John Gadsby Chapman, 1835

In 1608, Captain Newport realized that an alliance with the confederacy was crucial to the survival of the small and weak Jamestown colony. In the summer of that year, he tried to "crown" the Mamanatowick with a ceremonial crown to trick him into becoming a vassal of the English crown. They also gave out many gifts from Europe, such as a pitcher, a feather mattress, a bed frame, and clothes. The coronation went badly because they asked Powhatan to kneel to receive the crown, which he refused. As a powerful leader, Powhatan followed two rules: "he who keeps his head higher than others ranks higher," and "he who puts other people in a vulnerable position, without altering his own stance, ranks higher." To finish the "coronation", several English colonists had to lean on Powhatan's shoulders to get him low enough to place the crown on his head, as he was a tall man. Afterward, the English colonists might have thought that Powhatan had submitted to King James, whereas Powhatan likely thought nothing of the sort.

After John Smith became president of the Virginia Colony, he sent a force under Captain Martin to occupy an island in Nansemond territory and drive its native inhabitants away. At the same time, he sent another force with Francis West to build a fort at the James River Falls. This attempt at settling beyond Jamestown soon failed due to the natives' resistance. Smith left Virginia for England in October 1609, never to return, due to an injury sustained in a gunpowder accident. Soon afterward in 1609, English colonists established a second fort, Fort Algernon, in Kecoughtan territory.

=== Anglo-Powhatan Wars and treaties ===
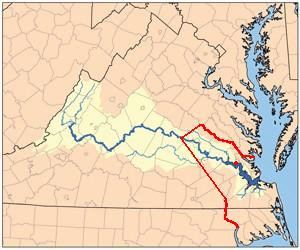
The red line shows the boundary between the Virginia Colony and the tributary native tribes, as established by the Treaty of 1646. The red dot on the river shows Jamestown, the capital of the Virginia Colony.

In November 1609, Captain John Ratcliffe was invited to Orapax, the Powhatan Confederacy's new capital. After Ratcliffe sailed up the Pamunkey River to trade, a fight broke out between the colonists and the natives. All of the English colonists ashore were killed, including Ratcliffe, who was ritually tortured by the women of the tribe. Those aboard the pinnace escaped and told the tale at Jamestown.

During the next year, the confederacy attacked and killed many Jamestown residents. Jamestown fought back, but only killed twenty from the confederacy. The arrival of a new governor, Thomas West, 3rd Baron De La Warr, (Lord Delaware), in June 1610 signaled the beginning of the First Anglo-Powhatan War. A brief period of peace came only after the capture of Pocahontas, her baptism, and her marriage to a tobacco planter, John Rolfe, in 1614. Within a few years, both Powhatan and Pocahontas were dead. Powhatan died in Virginia, while Pocahontas died in England. English settlement in confederacy territory continued unabated.

After Wahunsenacawh's death, his younger brother, Opitchapam, briefly became Mamanatowick, followed by their younger brother Opechancanough. The native's survival was threatened by the influx of English settlers who built towns on traditional farming lands, creating a need for the natives to purchase food from the settlers. The English also forcibly placed native youth in "colleges."

In March 1622, the confederacy attacked the Jamestown plantations, killing hundreds. The settlers quickly sought retaliation, killing hundreds of natives and burning fields. In 1644, the confederacy again attacked English colonial settlements to force them from the confederacy's territories; their attack was again met with strong reprisals from the colonists, ultimately resulting in the near destruction of the confederacy. The Second Anglo–Powhatan War that followed the 1644 incident ended in 1646 after Royal Governor of Virginia William Berkeley's forces captured Opechancanough, thought to be between 90 and 100 years old. While a prisoner, Opechancanough was killed, shot in the back by a soldier assigned to guard him. He was succeeded as Mamanatowick by Necotowance, and later by his daughter Cockacoeske.

The Treaty of 1646 marked the dissolution of the confederacy and granted English colonists an exclusive enclave between the York River and Blackwater River. This physically separated the Nansemonds, Weyanokes, and Appomattox, who retreated southward, from the other tribes then occupying the Middle Peninsula and Northern Neck. While the southern frontier demarcated in 1646 was respected for the remainder of the 17th century, the House of Burgesses lifted the northern one on September 1, 1649. Waves of new immigrants quickly flooded the peninsular region, then known as Chickacoan. This restricted the tribes to smaller and smaller tracts of land that became some of the earliest Indian reservations.

In 1665, the House of Burgesses passed stringent laws requiring the confederacy to accept chiefs appointed by the governor. After the Treaty of Albany in 1684, the Powhatan Confederacy all but vanished.

=== Changing society and English expansion ===
Assimilation programs established through the creation of an Indian School at the College of William & Mary in 1691 were a driving force behind cultural change. The college provided native boys with skills considered useless by their own people. However, settlers viewed Western literacy as a benefit, and boys who had received an education at William & Mary sent their sons to the school.

Many of the survivors had begun gambling, smoking tobacco, and consuming alcohol recreationally by the end of the 17th century.

== Culture and lifeways ==
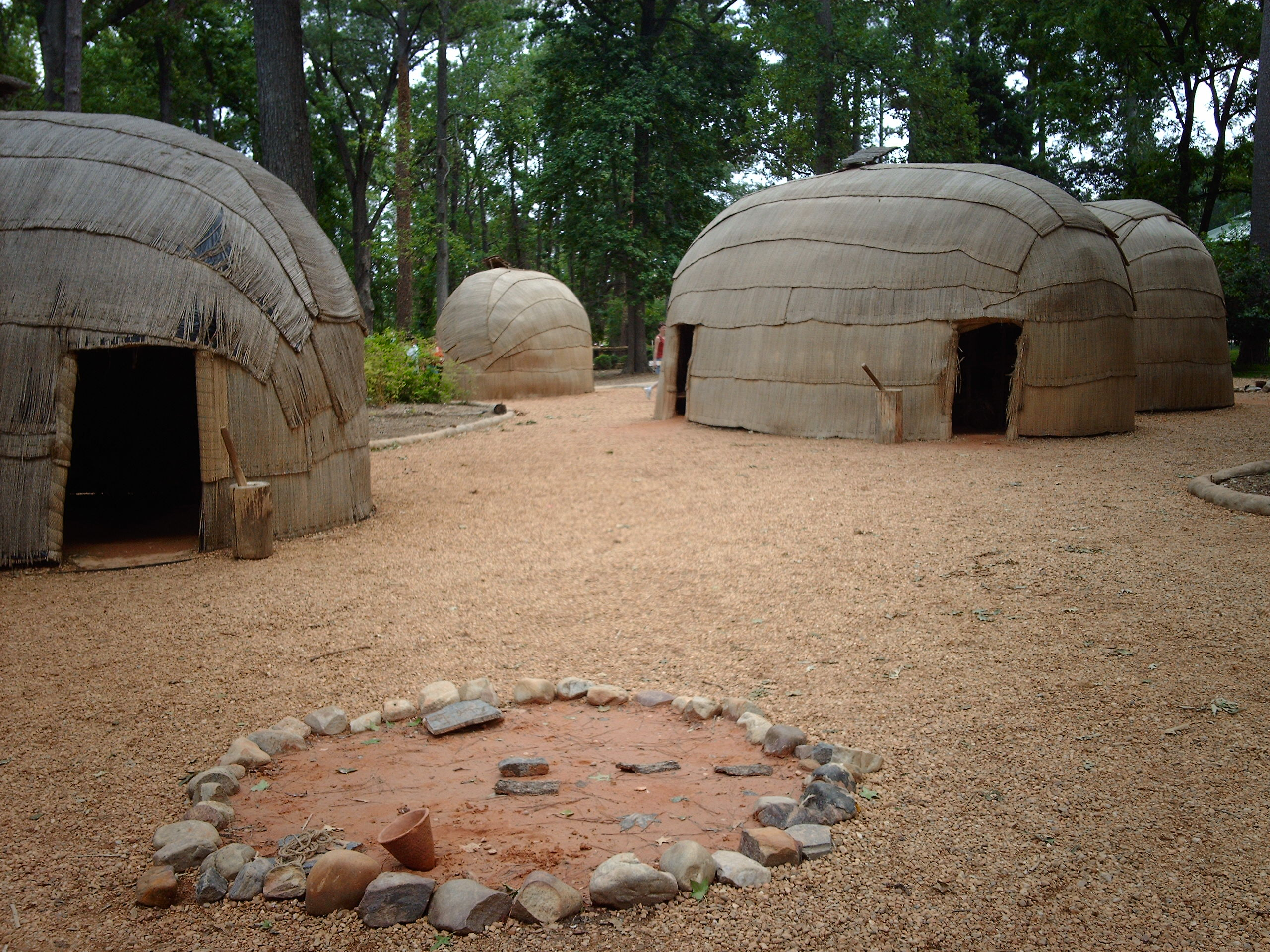
Reconstructed town at the Jamestown Settlement living-history museum.

The peoples of the confederacy lived east of the Fall Line in Tidewater Virginia. They built their houses, called yehakins, by bending saplings and placing woven mats or bark over the top of the saplings. They supported themselves most through agriculture using crops such as maize. They also fished and hunted in the region's large forests. Towns consisted of many related families organized in nations led by a Weroance or Weroansqua if female. They, in turn, were led by the Mamanatowick for Confederacy-wide issues.

The confederacy was roughly bounded by the Potomac River to the north, the Fall Line to the west, the Virginia-North Carolina border to the south, and the Atlantic Ocean to the east. Generally, peaceful interactions with the Pamlicos and Chowanocs occurred along the southern boundary, while the western and northern boundaries were more contested. Conflicts occurred with Monacans and Mannahoacs along the western boundary and the Massawomecks along the northern boundary.

Fires were primarily used to heat their sleeping rooms. As a result, less bedding was needed, and bedding materials could be easily stored during daytime hours. Couples typically slept head to foot. Due to early English hopes that they could appropriate the Powhatan Confederacy for profit, as the Spanish did in their colonies, their statements detailing rigid tribute and hierarchy are "most assurdly overestimated."

Men were soldiers and hunters, while women were farmers and gatherers. Women spent much of their hours growing crops, pounding corn into meals, gathering nuts, and performing other important jobs. When the men undertook extended hunts, the women went ahead of them to construct hunting camps. The economy depended on the labor of both sexes. Women would form work parties to accomplish tasks more efficiently. Women also acted as barbers, home furnishers, and clothing makers. Overall, women maintained independence in both their work lives and sexual lives. After a long day, they would celebrate and burn off any last energy they had by dancing and singing. This also allowed them to release any tensions they had from working.

The native residents of Tsenacommacah practiced Three Sisters agriculture. They periodically moved their towns to different locations. They cleared the fields by felling, girdling, or firing trees at the base and then using fire to reduce the slash and stumps. To stop a town from becoming unusable as soil productivity gradually declined and local fish and game were depleted. The inhabitants would instead move on to allow the area to revitalize, the soil to replenish, the foliage to grow, and the number of fish and game to increase. With every location change, the people used fire to clear new land. The peoples of Tsenacommacah also used fire to maintain extensive areas of open game habitat throughout the East, later called "barrens" by European colonists. There were also rich fishing grounds along the confederacy's shores and rivers. Bison had migrated to this area by the early 15th century.

=== Religion ===
English settlers observed the native people making offerings and praying at sunrise. They also prayed and made offerings to specific spirits, who were believed to ensure a good harvest. They used the land differently, and their religion was a native one. Significantly, one of the major duties of priests was controlling the weather.

== Members of the confederacy ==
The number of members of the Confederacy listed below and the number of soldiers are based on estimates or reports which mostly go back to Captain John Smith (1580 - 1631) and William Strachey (1572 - 1621). Usually, only the number of soldiers of the individual members is known; the stem number will therefore be determined with a ratio of 1: 3, 1: 3,3, or the last 1: 4, and the studies of Christian Feest are decisive. The last-mentioned figures refer to the first mention as well as the last mention of the respective members - e.g., 1585/1627 for the Chesapeake (Source: Handbook of North American Indians).

Tribe	From the Chesapeake Bay upriver the Powhatan (James) River and on the Virginia Peninsula
Chesapeake	Their name's meaning is disputed: it may mean "at a big river", "great water", or it might have just referred to a town located at the bay's mouth. The Chesapeake lived in the region of the Hampton Roads along the Rivers Powhatan River (later: James River), Nansemond River, and Elizabeth River to the Chesapeake Bay, their territory encompasses what is now Norfolk, Portsmouth, Chesapeake, and Virginia Beach. Their capital Skicoke may have been near the junction of the Eastern and Southern Branches of the Elizabeth River in downtown Norfolk. Other evidence suggests it was located in the Pine Beach area of Sewell's Point. The Chesapeake also had two other towns, Apasus and Chesepioc, near the Chesapeake Bay in the present-day city of Virginia Beach. Chesepioc was located in Great Neck Point. Archaeological evidence suggests that the Chesapeake people may have been Carolina Algonquians, possibly Pamlico. According to William Strachey, they were destroyed as a tribe before 1607 based on a vision by the Powhatan; their towns were resettled by members of other tribes; their then-installed chief was Keyghanghton, with about 100 soldiers (335 tribal members). (1585 / 1627) - now extinct as a tribe.
Nansemond	They called their land along both sides of the Nansemond River Chuckatuck and encompassed the areas of the cities of Suffolk and Chesapeake, four towns are known by name (the capital Nansemond, then Mattanock, Teracosick, and Mentoughquemec), on Dumpling Island were their temples and the seat of the Weroance, English colonists burned the sanctuary and the settlement in 1609; their Weroance was Weyhohomo; about 200 soldiers (665 tribal members - according to Smith; Strachey) - according to their descendants, they numbered about 300 soldiers (or 1,200 tribal members). (1585 - today, one of the state-recognized tribes of Virginia).
Appomattoc	Lived along the Lower Appomattox River in the area of Tri-Cities of Virginia with Petersburg as its head of navigation in adjoining counties of Chesterfield, Dinwiddie, and Prince George in south-central Virginia; their leading Werowance was Coquonasum with his capital was in the town of Wighwhippoc on the northside of Wighwhippoc Creek (now: Swift Creek), his sister Opossunoquonuske (Opussoquionuske) (referred to by English colonists as ″Queen of Appamattuck/Hattica″) was Weroansqua of the main town Mattica/Hattica near the mouth of the Appomattox River; 60 soldiers (or 200 tribal members - according to Smith) or 20 soldiers / 100 soldiers (or 65 / 335 tribal members according to Strachey). (1607 / 1705) - now extinct as a tribe.
Arrohateck / Arrohattoc	Lived in six towns east of the Powhatan tribe on both sides of the James River in Henrico County, Virginia, their main town was at the James River in today's Henrico, Virginia; their Weroance was Ashuaquid; about 100 soldiers (or 200 tribal members - according to Smith and Strachey) - Feest estimated at least 300 members. (1607 / 1611) - now extinct as a tribe.
Kecoughtan / Kikotan / Kiccowtan / Kikowtan	Lived in the Hampton Roads, they had only one settlement, its location is disputed - it is assumed at present-day Kecoughtan, Virginia (later called: Elizabeth City) or downtown Hampton, Virginia or Newport News, Virginia, according to William Strachey, Powhatan had slain the Weroance at Kecoughtan in 1597, appointing his own young son Pochins as successor there, while resettling some of the tribe at the Piankatank River. Powhatan annihilated the inhabitants at Piankatank in 1608. (1607 / 1610) - now extinct as a tribe.
Paspahegh	Lived opposite the Quiyoughcohanock along the north bank of the James River to the junction of the James and Chickahominy Rivers in today's Charles City and James City Counties, they maintained several settlements on both sides upriver the Chickahominy River - Namqosick and Cinquaoteck on the east bank of the Chickahominy as three towns not known by name - including their capital - on the west bank, their towns were the closest to Jamestown, Virginia; their Weroance was Wowinchopunck; 40 soldiers(or 135 citizens- according to Smith and Strachey) - but Feest believes that these numbers are too low, quoting George Percy (1607: 139-140), who informed that the Paspahegh Weroance visited the British with "one hundred Sauages armed" and the next day "fortie of his men with a Deere." sent. (1607 / 1610) - now extinct as a tribe.
Potchiack / Potchayick	Lived along the James River in the area of Surry County, were formed and emerged as a new polity at the beginning of the 17th century from scattered groups of Nansemond, Warraskoyack, and Quiyoughcohannock; in 1669, about 30 warriors (or 100 citizens - according to Hening). (1661 /1669) - now extinct as a tribe.
Powhatan / Powatan	Lived east of the Atlantic Seaboard fall line on both sides of the Powhatan (James) River and north of the Kingsland Creek, their capital Powhatan or Paqwachowng (literally "town at the rapids") was close to the waterfalls (called Paqwachowng) in the vicinity of Richmond, the capital of Virginia, besides, they inhabited at least three smaller, not known, towns (according to Smith), Archer (1607a: 86) adds another town on Mayo Island in James River opposite of their capital, which he called Pawatahs Towre (Powhatan Town); their Weroance was Parahunt, another son of Powhatan; about 40 warriors (or 135 members - according to Smith) or 50 soldiers(and 165 members - according to Strachey), according Feest up to 300 members is likely due to the number of settlements. (1607 / 1670) - now extinct as a tribe - Not the same as the Powhatan Renape Nation of New Jersey, a state-recognized tribe of New Jersey.
Quiyoughcohannock / Quiockohannock / Coiacohanauke	Lived east of the Weanock on both sides of the James River in several towns, their capital Quiyoughcohannock was the spiritual center of the Powhatan Confederacy, three towns are known by name: Quiyoughcohannock, Nantapoyac (perhaps Zuñiga's Manattapoyek), and Chawopo, which was led by the former Quiyoughcohannock Weroance Chopoke /Choapock, there were also two other not known towns along Chippoak Creek (in the area of today Chippokes Plantation State Park), they were often mistakenly referred to as the "Tappahannock" after the capital of the northern Rappahanock; their Weroance Pepiscumah (Pipisco) was appointed by Powhatan - further known leaders were the Weroansqua Oholasc and the Weroance Tatahcoope; estimates range from 25 warriors (or 85 members - according to Smith), 60 soldiers (or 200 members - according to Strachey) up to about 300 and even more members (according to Feest), some banded together with splinter groups of Warraskoyack and Nansemond to form a new tribe - the short-lived Potchiack. (1607 / 1627) - now extinct as a tribe.
Warraskoyack / Warrosquyoake / Warrascocke	Lived northwest of the Nansemond along the Pagan (Warraskoyak) River down to its mouth into the James River in Warrosquyoake Shire (today: Isle of Wight, Southampton, Greensville, and Brunswick Counties), the main Warraskoyak town was located in present-day Smithfield, Virginia, while a satellite town called Mokete was at Pagan Point, and another called Mathomank was on Burwell's Bay under a Weroance named Sasenticum. To the southwest and west the north bank of the Blackwater River was the boundary to the enemy Nottoway (Cheroenhaka) people, to the south along the Chowan River lived the rival Chowanoc people with 19 towns the most numerous and powerful of the Carolina Algonquian-speaking tribes in North Carolina, the shore of the James River was the northern boundary of Warraskoyack territory; their Weroance was Tackonekintaco; about 40 warriors (or 135 members according to Smith) or 60 soldiers (and 200 members according to Strachey), some banded together with splinter groups of Quiyoughcohannock and Nansemond to form a new tribe, the short-lived Potchiack (1585/1627) who are now extinct as a tribe.
Weanock / Weyanock / Weanoc / Weyanoke	Lived on both sides of James River on Weyanoke Peninsula or Weanoc Neck in Charles City County, Virginia upriver of the Quiyoughcohannock and Paspahegh and south of the Arrohateck and Appamatuck, to the north of their territory lived the Chickahominy people, while independent, the Chickahominy were at times allied to the Confederacy; according to Smith their capital (Tindall's Pomonke) as well two not named towns on the north bank of the James River - Archer (1607a: 82) adds another town on the north bank -, south of the James River he tells of three more towns (the second of them is Tindall's "Wynough", perhaps identical with Zuñiga's "Weanock"), Strachey (1953: 64) mentions an additional Weanock "province" called Cecocomake near Powell's Creek in Prince George County. After 1623, the settlements Tanx (Little) Weanock north and Great Weanock south of the James River are mentioned, and at least until 1627 there were still two Weanock towns; their Weroance was Kaquothocun; about 100 warriors (or 335 members according to Smith) or 150 warriors (or 500 members according to Strachey, which adds 50 soldiers for Cecocomake, the Weanock province). By the 18th century, they had fully integrated with the Nottoways and were speaking their language, their former presence visible only in the surname "Wineoak" (1607/1707), now extinct as a tribe.
Tribe	Along the Pamunkey (York) River and its tributaries - Youghtanund (Pamunkey) River and Mattaponi River - as well as the southern Middle Peninsula and the Pamunkey Neck
Kiskiack / Chisiack / Chiskiack	Lived in several towns along the south bank of the York River in today's York County (formerly Charles River County) in the northern part of the Virginia Peninsula between the Paspehegh in the west and the Kecoughtan to the east, their capital also known as Kiskiack was about 15 miles (24 km) from Jamestown; their Weroance was Ottahotin; about 40-50 warriors (or 135-170 members - according to Smith & Strachey). (1607 / 1677) - now extinct as a tribe, the remaining Kiskiack appear to have merged and intermarried with other groups, probably the Pamunkey, Chickahominy, or Rappahannock.
Cantauncack / Candaungack	Lived along the north bank of the York River, between Carter and Cedarbush Creeks; their Weroance was Ohonnamo; about 100 soldiers (or 335 members - according to Strachey). (1608 / 1629) - now extinct as a tribe.
Werowocomoco / Werowacomoco	Were living along the York River upriver to the confluence of the Pamunkey and Mattaponi Rivers - since the first capital of the Powhatan Confederacy lay in their territory, this tribe was known by the same name as the capital - it was called Werowocomoco/Werowacomoco - the name "Werowocomoco" comes from the Powhatan werowans (weroance), meaning "leader" in English; and komakah (-comoco), "settlement" - literally: "settlement of the leader", the capital of the Powhatan Confederacy Werowocomoco itself lay on the north bank of the York River in Gloucester County near the city of Yorktown - here resided Powhatan until 1609 when he moved his capital to a new location named Orapaks/Orapax/Orapakes; about 40 warriors (or 135 members - according to Smith & Strachey). (1607 / 1611) - now extinct as a tribe.
Caposepock(e) / Kaposecocke / Kupkipcock	Lived along the north bank of the Pamunkey River; their Weroance was Weyamat - presumably Kaposecocke was, however, only one of the largest towns within the Pamunkey and was under the Werowance of the Pamunkey; However, Strachey gives them to him about 400 warriors and 1,300 members. (1608 / 1611) - now extinct as a tribe.
Orapax / Orapaks / Orapakes	Lived between the upper reaches of the Chickahominy River and the Pamunkey River in the north, on their western border lived the hostile Eastern Sioux tribes, south of them lived the real Powhatan tribe, and north of them the Youghtanund, and directly downstream they had the powerful autonomous Chickahominy as neighbors, since 1609 the second capital of the Powhatan Confederacy called "Orapaks/ Orapax/Orapakes" - Werowocomoco had been abandoned due to the colonists' pressure to settle - was located in their area, this was built for better defense in a swamp area in western New Kent County on the north bank of the Upper Chickahominy River, chief Powhatan resided here (about 1609 - 1611/1614); approx. 50 warriors or 165 members (according to Strachey). (1607 / 1611)
Pamareke / Pamuncoroy / Pamakeroy	Lived along the south bank of the Pamunkey River - sometimes attributed to Pamunkey; their Weroance was Attasquintan; about 400 soldiers or 1,300 members (according to Strachey). (1608 / 1611).
Pamunkey	Lived on both sides of the Pamunkey River above its mouth into the York River in today's King William and New Kent Counties had several main towns, with about 300 soldiers and 1000 members the largest and most powerful nation within the Confederacy (according to Smith & Strachey), (today a federally recognized tribe)).
Paraconosko / Paraconos	Along the Pamunkey River; their Weroancewas Attossomunck (originally a Werowance of the Tauxenent/Doeg); about 10 soldiers or 35 members. (1608 / 1611).
Potaunk / Pataunck / Potawuncack	Lived along the southern banks of the Pamunkey River; their Weroance was Essenataught; about 100 warriors or 335 members (according to Strachey). (1608 / 1611).
Shamapent / Shamapa	Lived south of the Pamunkey River; their Weroance was Nansuapunck; about 100 warriors or 335 members (according to Strachey). (1608 / 1611).
Quackohamaock / Quackohowaon / Ochahannanke / Ochahannauke	Lived either on both sides of the Mattaponi River or along the north bank of the Pamunkey River; their Weroance was Vropaack; about 40 soldiers or 135 members (according to Strachey). (1608 / 1611).
Youghtanund / Youghtamund	Lived northwest of the Pamunkey, along the Pamunkey River to the confluence of the North Anna and South Anna Rivers, which form the Pamunkey River; their Weroance was Pomiscatuck; about 60 warriors or 200 members (according to Smith) or 70 warriors or 235 members (according to Strachey). (1607 / 1611).
Cattachiptico / Cattachipico / Cakkiptico / Chepecho / Chepeco	The main town Cattachiptico was located on the site of today's Pampatike on the Pamunkey River in what is now King William County, other smaller towns were along Totopotmoy Creek (Manskin Creek) and possibly along the Mattaponi River, presumably these towns all belonged to a subgroup of the Pamunkey – the Manaskint / Manskin, which also maintained close ties to the Youghtanand – during the Second Anglo-Powhatan War their main town Cattachiptico figured as the headquarters of Opechancanough then Mamanatowick; their Weroance was Opopohcumunck (possibly meaning Opechancanough); about 300 warriors or 1,000 members (according to Strachey). (1608 / 1611).
Menapacunt / Mummapacune / Mummapacun	Lived between the north bank of the Pamunkey River and the Mattaponi River; their territory was most likely upstream (and thus northwest) of the Mattaponi and Pamunkey; their Weroance was Ottondeacommoc; about 100 warriors or 335 members (according to Strachey). (1608 / 1611).
Mattaponi / Mattapanient	Lived along the central reaches of the Pamunkey and the Mattaponi Rivers until their confluence with the York River in today King William and King and Queen Counties, their main town was named Mattapanient according to Smith, another town was Cinquoteck in the area of West Point (formerly Delaware) (at the confluence of Pamunkey and Mattaponi); their Weroance was Werowough; approximately 30 warriors or 100 members (according to Smith) or 140 soldiers or 465 members (according to Strachey) (now as Mattaponi and Upper Mattaponi two of the state-recognized tribes of Virginia).
Payankatank / Piankatank	Lived in several towns - Smith names three - along the Piankatank River in what is now Middlesex County, to the west their territory bordered the Opiscopank/Opiscatumek, to the south the Werowocomoco / Werowacomoco, and to the north lived directly on the other side of the Rappahannock River the Lower Cuttatawomen, according to Strachey these were defeated by the Powhatan Confederacy in 1608, 24 soldiers were killed and all women and children were taken captive, the area and the towns were then repopulated with former inhabitants of Kecoughtan; Smith gives two numbers: in 1608 about 40 warriors or 135 members, and in 1624 about 50-60 warriors or 165-200 members, according to Strachey about 40-50 soldiers or 135-200 members – according to Feest possibly up to 300 members. (1608 / 1611).
Tribe	Lived along the Rappahannock River north toward the Patawomeck (Tidal Potomac) River and on the northern Middle Peninsula and the Northern Neck
Rappahannock	A powerful polity in the Rappahannock River Valley settled in 13 towns on both sides of the river named after them; their main town was Topahanocke / Tappahannock and their main hunting grounds were south of the river. Due to their military strength and geographical distance from the center of the Powhatan Confederacy, they often acted autonomously; their Weroance was Taweeren; ca. 100 soldiers or 335 members (according to Smith & Strachey). (1608 – now one of the state-recognized tribes of Virginia).
Opiscopank / Opiscatumek	(1608 / 1611).
Lower Cuttatawomen / Corrotoman	Lived in Lancaster County as a direct neighbor of the Moraughtachand/Moratico to the northwest and the Wicocomoco/Wighcocomoco to the north – their territory bordered the Rappahannock River to the south and the Chesapeake Bay to the east; 30 soldiers or 100 members (according to Smith & Strachey). (1608 / 1656).
Matchotic / Mattehatique	Sometimes referred to as Lower Matchotic, lived between the Rappahannock River and the Patawomeck (Potomac) River, north of them lived the Pissaseck and south of them lived the Chicacoan (Seccawoni) – further upstream another group called Upper Matchotic is identified; sometimes the name Matchotic is used as Collective noun for the Tauxenent (Doeg), Patawomeck (Potomac), Cuttatawomen, Pissasec, and Onawmanient in Northumberland, King George and Westmoreland Counties. (1608 / 1659 or 1669).
Moraughtachund / Moratico	Lived on the north bank of the Rappahannock River south of the Rappahannock tribe and north of the Lower Cuttatawomen in what is now Lancaster and Richmond Counties; their Weroance was Ottondeacommoc; 80 soldiers or 270 members (according to Smith & Strachey). (1608 / 1669).
Pissaseck / Pissasec	Lived from the north bank of the Rappahannock River to the south bank of the Potomac River, between the Matchotic (Mattehatique) in the south and the Potomac (Patawomeck) in the north. (1608 / 1611).
Nantaughtacund /Nausatico / Nanzatico	Lived on both sides of the Rappahannock River in the Caroline, King George, and Essex Counties above the Rappahannock tribe and south of the Potomac (Patawomeck); since the middle of the 17th century scattered Nantaughtacund, Patawomeck, Matchotic/Mattehatique, Rappahannock, the Portobago/Portobacco from Maryland, and smaller groups such as the cities Nanzemond, Warisquock, and Ausaticon are known under the anglicized name Nanzatico for this period, in 1705 after a murder committed by members the entire tribe (including some refugees of neighboring tribes – except the Portobago/Portobacco and Rappahannock) were deported to Antigua of the Lesser Antilles and thus ceased to exist as an ethnic group; their Weroance was Vropaack, about 150 soldiers or 500 citizens (according to Smith and Strachey). (1608 / 1705).
Upper Cuttatawomen	Lived along the north bank of the Upper Rappahannock River in what is now King George County; to the north their territory bordered the Patawomeck/Potomac, and directly on the south side of the river lived the Nantaughtacund; about 20 warriors or 70 members (according to Smith & Strachey). (1608 / 1611).
Wicocomoco / Wicocomico / Wighcocomoco / Wicomico	Lived at the southern tip of the Northern Neck along the south bank of the Potomac River and its estuary into the Chesapeake Bay; According to Stephen Potter, their main town was on the upper reaches and slightly north of the Little Wicomico River and another town called Cinquck near the mouth and south of the Little Wicomico in Northumberland County; their Weroance was Mosco; in 1655 the colonial rulers ordered the Chicacoan to join forces with the Wicocomoco (between 1656/1659 the Lower Cuttatawomen had also joined them) and as a common new tribe under the leadership of the English-appointed chief Machywap to settle in a reservation (approximately 18 km2) near Dividing Creek south of the Great Wicomico River; about 130 warriors or 435 citizens (according to Smith and Strachey). (1608 / 1719).
Chicacoan / Sekakawon / Sekakawoni / Seccawoni / Cekakawwon	Lived along the Coan River, a tributary of the Potomac River, in what is now Northumberland County, with about 30 soldiers or 100 members (according to Smith), and other sources about 435 members (according to Smith and Strachey). (1608 / 1660).
Onawmanient	Lived south of Upper Cuttatawomen in Nominy Bay in Westmoreland County; about 100 warriors or 335 members (according to Smith).
Patawomeck / Potomac / Potomack	Lived in at least ten towns along the south bank of the Patawomeck (Potomac) River; approx. 160 warriors or 540 members (1612) or about 200 warriors or 670 members (1624 – both according to Smith); according to Strachey, about 160 soldiers or 540 members. (1608 / 1668). In 1666, the Governor's Council of Virginia called for the "utter destruction" of the Patawomeck. After a devastating attack by the English, the surviving Patawomeck converted to Christianity and remained in the area of White Oak. Their descendants were recognized as a tribe by the state of Virginia in 2010.
Tauxenent / Doeg / Taux / Tacci / Doag / Dogue/ Dogi	Lived in four towns north of the Patawomeck along the south bank of the Upper Patawomeck (Potomac) River above Aquia Creek in what is now Caroline, Prince William, Fairfax, and King George Counties, their main town Tauxenent was located on Doggs Island or Miompse / May-Umps (now known as Mason Neck, south of Washington, D.C.), other towns were Pamacocack (later anglicized to Quantico along Quantico Creek, Yosococomico along Powells Creek near Montclair, Virginia, Niopsco along Neabsco Creek and Namassingakent on the north bank of the Dogue Creek, Assaomeck on the south bank of Hunting Creek and Namoraughquend near today's Roosevelt Island; about 40 soldiers or 135 members (according to Smith & Strachey), probably too low a population. (1607 / 1675).
Tribe	Lived on Southern Delmarva Peninsula were usually only nominally members of the Powhatan Confederation from the mainland, as they were geographically separated from it by the Chesapeake Bay
Accomac	Were organized into a confederation of about 2,000 members under the leadership of Debedeavon ("The Laughing King") when they first came into contact with English colonists in 1608, lived on the Southern Delmarva Peninsula on the Eastern Shore of Virginia; but only about 80 warriors or 270 citizens (according to Smith) – more recent archaeological/historical studies and comparisons with other sources make a much larger population more likely; in the late 17th century were mostly referred to by the colonists as Gingaskins.
Accohannock	Lived along Accohannock Creek in the counties of Accomack and Northampton north of the Accomac Confederation in Virginia; were under the leadership of Kiptoteke, the brother of Debedeavon, and therefore probably politically subject to the Accomac Confederation; about 40 citizens or 135 members.

== 20th-century history ==
Virginia passed stringent racial segregation laws in the early 20th century and the Racial Integrity Act of 1924 which mandated every person who had any African heritage be deemed "black". Walter Plecker, the head of the state's vital statistics office for more than thirty years, directed all state and local registration offices to use only the terms "white" or "colored" to denote race on official documents. This eliminated all traceable records of the native people who lived in Virginia, including birth certificates, death certificates, marriage licenses, tax forms, and land deeds. Plecker took a personal interest in eliminating traces of Virginia Indians and surmized that no true Virginia Indians were remaining, as years of intermarriage had "diluted the race". Over his years of service, he conducted a campaign to reclassify all biracial and multiracial individuals as Black, believing such persons were fraudulently attempting to claim their race to be Indian or white. The effect of his reclassification has been described by tribal members as "paper genocide".

After the United States entered World War II, many of Virginia's native people volunteered to serve in the military. Virginia Indian men fought to be regarded separately from the Black community by the Selective Service. In 1954, they were given partial legal recognition by the Virginia General Assembly through a law stating that people with one-fourth or more Indian ancestry and one-sixteenth or less African ancestry were to be recognized as tribal Indians.

== Confederacy tribes today ==
=== State-recognized tribes ===
The Commonwealth of Virginia has recognized eleven tribes, beginning with the Mattaponi and Pamunkey since its establishment. In the 1980s, Virginia recognized six more tribes, also descended from the Powhatan Confederacy. In 2010, Virginia recognized three more tribes; one being the Patawomeck Indian Tribe of Virginia, who identify as being descendants of the Patawomeck people who were loosely connected to the Powhatan Confederacy.

Of these state-recognized tribes that identify as being descendants of the peoples of the Confederacy, all but the Mattaponi Indian Nation and the Patawomeck Indian Tribe of Virginia have since gained federal recognition.

The Powhatan Renape Nation are a state-recognized tribe in New Jersey that identifies as descendants of the Powhatan Confederacy.

=== Federally recognized tribes ===
Of the original members of the Powhatan Confederacy, there are six federally recognized tribes today, all based in Virginia.

1. Chickahominy Indian Tribe
2. Chickahominy Indian Tribe–Eastern Division
3. Nansemond Indian Nation
4. Pamunkey Indian Tribe
5. Rappahannock Tribe, Inc.
6. Upper Mattaponi Tribe

The Pamunkey Indian Tribe was the first to gain federal recognition in 2016. The other six were recognized by Congress through the Thomasina E. Jordan Indian Tribes of Virginia Federal Recognition Act of 2017. Two of these tribes, the Mattaponi and Pamunkey, still retain their reservations from the 17th century and are located in King William County, Virginia. As part of a treaties in 1646 and 1677, the tribes agreed to bring wild game to the governor of Virginia each year.

== Languages of the confederacy ==
Most members of the Powhatan Confederacy likely spoke mutually intelligible Algonquian languages. This use became dormant due to the widespread deaths and social disruption suffered by the people. Much of the vocabulary is forgotten. Attempts have been made to reconstruct a language using sources such as word lists provided by Smith and by the 17th-century writer William Strachey.

== See also ==
- Black Indians in the United States
- Native Americans in the United States
- Tribe (Native American)
