= Nemattanew =

Captain of the Powhaten Confederacy (died 1621/22)

Nemattanew / "Munetute"
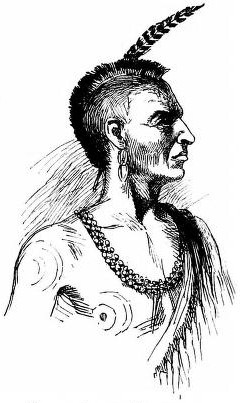
- Conjectural illustration of "Jack o' the Feather"

Personal details
- Born: c. 1600 Tsenacommacah
- Died: November 1621 or March 1621/22 (O.S./N.S.) Near Berkeley Hundred, Virginia Colony
- Cause of death: Gunshot wound
- Nickname(s): Jack of the Feather(s), Munetute, Nemattanow, Nemattanon

Nemattanew (d. 1622 N.S.) was a weroance leader of the Powhatan during the First Anglo-Powhatan War. At the time he served as a close adviser to Mamanatowick Opechancanough (1554-1646).

== History ==
Nemattanew first appears in English colonial records in 1611, when George Percy mentioned a "Munetute" as being sent by Mamanatowick Wahunsunacawh to lead resistance to the colonists' expansion in the upper James River region. This was when Henricus was founded, during the course of the First Anglo-Powhatan War.

Percy notes that the colonists derisively called the leader "Jacke of the Feathers", on account of his native war regalia, remarking that:

"...he used to come into the field all covered over with feathers and swans' wings fastened unto his shoulders, as though he meant to fly".

Nemattanew reportedly never sustained injuries in these skirmishes (small, quick attacks, ambushes or unplanned battles), leading him and others to believe he was supernaturally immune to musket-fire. He persuaded his fellow tribesmen of this attribute, enhancing his reputation with them. George Wyatt of Kent (father of governor Francis Wyatt) was convinced that Nemattanew had instilled his tribesmen with:

"[A] strong perswation [sic] of an Ointment that could secuere them from our [Gunshot]..."

In the more peaceful times following war, Nemattanew continued to play a prominent role. The colonists trained him to become a proficient musket shot. At one point in 1618, he raided an English colonial settlement, capturing some guns, but these were returned by Chief Opechancanough.

In 1619, Opechancanough sent Nemattanew to propose that the English colonists contribute eight to ten soldiers to accompany a Powhatan war party for an assault on a Siouan-speaking tribe above the Fall Line to avenge some Powhatan women they had slain. In return, the Powhatans would equally share all plundered captives, corn and territory with the colonists. This proposal was accepted by House of Burgesses; however, it failed to implement it by supplying the soldiers.

A short time before the Indian massacre of 1622, in which the Powhatan attacked Henricus, Nemattanew appeared at the home of settler Morgan. He saw some trading-trinkets and proposed taking Morgan to Pamunkey to gain a good price. Morgan was never seen again. A few days later, Nemattanew showed up at the plantation and announced Morgan's death. As he was wearing Morgan's hat, settlers suspected the Native American might have killed the settler. They tried to force him to go with them to the nearest magistrate, he resisted, and one of the colonists fatally shot him. As Nemattanew lay dying, he begged to be buried behind English lines and not to reveal to his people that he had been felled by English gunfire.

In England, John Smith, who had not been in Virginia since 1609, wrote in his 1624 Generall Historie of Nemattanew's death as occurring two weeks before the Henrico massacre. But 20th-century historian Rountree says, based on contemporary documents, particularly Council in Virginia, that it occurred no later than November 1621, while George Yeardley was still governor. This was five months before the massacre. There is some evidence in this document that by 1621, Nemattanew had fallen out of favor with Opchanacanough. Modern historians debate the nature of Nemattanew's true role in this event. They agree that the massacre was already being planned before he died, rather than being in reaction to his death at the hands of English colonists.

== See also ==
- Epanow, Native American leader in New England at this time.
