= Necotowance =

Pamunkey chief (died before 1655)

Necotowance (Unknown birth year – died before 1655) was Werowance (leader) of the Pamunkey tribe and Mamanatowick of the Powhatan Confederacy after Opechancanough, from 1646 until his death sometime before 1655. Necotowance signed a treaty with the Colony of Virginia in 1646, at which time he was addressed by the English as "King of the Indians."

After his death he was succeeded by Totopotomoi as Weroance of the Pamunkey. Totopotomoi's wife, Cockacoeske, who became Weroansqua after Totopotomoi's death, briefly reunited some of the tribes.

== Background ==
In February 1644 Opechancanough, then mamanatowick of the Powhatan Confederacy in Tsenacommacah, made a final attempt to drive English colonists from Virginia. This was the beginning of a 2 1/2-year period of conflict between English colonists and the Indians of Virginia, known as the Third Anglo-Powhatan War. By 1646 Opechancanough, elderly, decrepit, and in ill health, but still with a fighting spirit, had to be carried into battle on a stretcher. Determined to end the war, Governor Sir William Berkeley attacked Opechancanough's village, captured him, and imprisoned him at Jamestown. It is believed that at the time of his capture Opechancanough had already been succeeded by Necotowance as mamantowick of the confederacy.

The origins of Necotowance are unknown, his first historical appearance was in October, 1646. After surrendering to the English, Necotowance signed a peace treaty with the General Assembly of Virginia which ended the Third Anglo-Powhatan War(1644-1646). In the Assembly he was identified as "Necotowance, king of the Indians," the successor of Opechancanough, Mamanatowick of the Powhatan Confederacy and appears to have been the leader of all the neighboring tribes on the south as well as the north side of the river.

Shortly after the treaty was signed, Opechancanough died in prison, shot to death by one of his jailers.

There followed a 30-year period of relative peace. During this time various Acts were passed by the Assembly to benefit and protect the Indians who were often the victims of land grabs and other unscrupulous activities. In one such instance in March 1659 a law was enacted because the King of Wyanoak had been arrested by his creditors because if his debts. Necotowance is sometimes misidentified as this 'King of Wyanoak', however, there is no evidence Necotowance was ever arrested and he is believed to have died before 1655.

Although Necotowance was successor to Opechancanough, this does not indicate he was his son. According to Dr. Helen C. Rountree (the leading researcher and writer on Virginia Indians), the Powhatans practiced matrilineal descent—Wahunsenacawh to Opitchapan to Opechancanough (all brothers of the same mother), to Catataugh to 2 living sister (unnamed) having the same mother; but, not necessarily the same father (Leaving aside adoption practices) would be the line of succession. Necotowance was likely the son of Opechancanough's sister or the son of one of his nieces. If Opechancanough followed tradition and married his niece, then it is possible that Necotowance was his son, however, there are no written records identifying exactly who the parents of Necotowance were. He is commonly identified as Pamunkey and Patawomeck Indian and son of Opechancanough and unknown.

Necotowance is believed by some to be the father of Totopotomoi. Because Totopotomoi succeeded Necotowance many assume they were father and son, however, as discussed before, the tribes practice of matrilineal succession makes it is more likely that Totopotomoi was the son of the sister of Necotowance or even a younger brother. Conversely, many people also identify Necotowance as the father of Cockacoeske, who was the wife of Totopotomoi. Although there was a practice in the Powhatan ruling family for the Mamantowick to marry his niece to preserve the ruling bloodline, marriage of sister to brother was not tolerated. It is not possible that Cockacoeske and Totopotomoi were both children of Necotowance. It is believed that Cockacoeske was either a daughter or granddaughter of Opechancanough. Her marriage to Totopotomoi increases the likelihood that Totopotomoi was Necotowance's younger brother, and that they were both the son's of Opechancanough's niece or sister.

== Weroances of Powhatan Confederacy ==
1. Toppahannock/Rappahonnock -Werowance of the Rappahannock; King of the “Queen’s River” Before 1607 -til ? (Strachey's notes on Smith's diary while a prisoner of Opechancanough). http://www.rappahannocktribe.org/p/
2. “Powhatan”-Wahun Son A Cock (Wahunsonacaw) Mamanatowick of the Powhatan Confederacy in 1607 when English colonists began their colonization of Virginia. Born circa 1547 (estimated to be 60 years old on 1607). Relinquished his office to his brother Opitchapam in 1618, due to poor health and died about April of that same year. Maternal brother of Opitchapam, Opechancanough, and Kekataugh. Inherited the office through his mother. Recorded by William Strachey in 1611 to have had 100 wives, and 32 living children, including Pocahontas.
3. Opitchapam - Also known as: Itoyatin, Otiotan and Sasawpen. Maternal brother of Wahunsenacawh and Opechancanough. Mamanatowick after the death of his older brother Wahunsenacawh, 1618 to 1630. While he was Mamanatowick his younger brother Opechancanough was his War Chief. Died in 1630 and Opechancanough became Mamanatowick.
4. Opechancanough: weroance and mamanatowick from 1630 to 1646. Died 1646. Also known as Mangopeesomon and Apachiso. Maternal brother of Wahunsenacawh and Opitchapam. Experts are saying his line is yDNA tied to West Indies NA, paternally. Weroance of the Pamunkey Tribe, war chief under Mamanatowick Opitchapam, planned the massacres of 1622 and 1644. Became mamanatowick of The Powhatan Confederacy upon the death of his brother Opitchapam. Captured by Sir William Berkeley and died while a captive at Jamestown in 1646, killed by a settler assigned to guard him out of revenge.
5. Necotowance - mamanatowick of the Powhatan Confederacy, “Emperor of the Indians”
6. Totopotomoi - Weof the Pamunkey 1649-1656; died in the Battle of Bloody Run.
7. Cockacoeske - weroance of Pamunkey and mamanatowick of the Powhatan Confederacy
8. Mrs Betty the Queen, possibly later known as Queen Ann -1686-1715

Preceded by Opechancanough	Weroance of the Pamunkey; 1644–1649	Succeeded by Totopotomoi

== Sources ==
- Middle Peninsula Historic Marker "Cockacoeske"
- "The Powhatan Indians of Virginia: Their Traditional Culture.", Rountree, Helen C., University of Oklahoma Press, 1989. ISBN 0-8061-2156-4
- "Cockacoeske, Queen of Pamunkey: Diplomat and Suzeraine.", Martha W. McCartney, 1898 - in "Powhatan's Mantle: Indians in the Colonial Southeast.", P. H. Wood and G. A. Waselkov, eds. pp 173–195. Lincoln: University of Nebraska Press.
- "The Royal Family of the Powhatan.", John C.E. Christensen says Nectowance is "assumed to be son of Opechoncanough. Signed Treaty with the Commonwealth of Virginia in 1645, at which time he was called by the English "King of the Indians."" See http://home.earthlink.net/~paws22/pow.htm#i1068
