= Orapax =

Former capital of the Powhatan Confederacy

Orapax Orapaks
- Native American Settlement
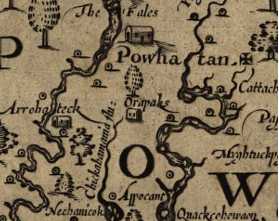
- Orapax settlement included in Captain John Smith's 1624 map of Virginia
- Established as capital: 1609
- Ceased as capital: 1614

Government
  - Type: Tribal government
  - Body: Powhatan Confederacy
  - Chief: Powhatan

Orapax (also spelled Orapakes or Orapaks) served as a significant capital for the Powhatan Confederacy during the early 17th century. This strategic relocation reflected the dynamic interactions between the indigenous Powhatan people and the encroaching English settlers.

== Establishment and location ==
In 1609, Wahunsenacawh, commonly known as Chief Powhatan, moved his primary residence from Werowocomoco to Orapax. This move was likely a strategic response to the increasing presence and pressure from English colonists at Jamestown. Orapax was situated approximately 50 miles west of Werowocomoco, nestled in a swamp at the headwaters of the Chickahominy River, in what is now New Kent County, Virginia. The swampy terrain provided natural defenses against potential threats. Powhatan erected a temple at Orapax which had four free-standing posts which resembled a wolf. The settlement included a trail which led to the western Shenandoah Valley.

The Orapax area is believed to be the burial site of Chief Powhatan.

=== Role in Powhatan-English Relations ===
Orapax became a focal point in the complex and often tumultuous relations between the Powhatan Confederacy and the English settlers. During this period, the English boy Henry Spelman lived among the Powhatan at Orapax for several months in 1609. His experiences provided valuable insights into Powhatan society and their perspectives on the English settlers. In late 1609, Captain John Ratcliffe led a group of about thirty colonists to Orapax, enticed by promises of corn and provisions. However, upon arrival, the English were ambushed, and Ratcliffe, along with his men, was killed.

In Captain John Smith's 1624 writings, he recounted that he had been taken to Orapax after being captured near the Chickahominy River in 1607 by Opechancanough's warriors.

== Subsequent relocations ==
By 1614, Chief Powhatan had relocated his capital from Orapax to Matchut, situated on the north bank of the Pamunkey River in present-day King William County. This move further inland may have been motivated by ongoing conflicts and the desire for a more secure position away from English encroachments.

== Legacy ==
Orapax is the namesake of the unincorporated community of Orapax Farms, Virginia. Today, the exact location of Orapax remains uncertain, with historians placing it along the Chickahominy River, possibly on its north side in western New Kent County. The modern-day interchange of Interstate 64 and Interstate 295 is near this location.

In 2010, a highway historical marker was unveiled to honor Orapax, recognizing its role during Chief Powhatan's leadership and the early interactions between Native Americans and English settlers.
