= Opechancanough =

Powhatan Confederacy chief (c.1554–1646)

- (Mangopeesomon)
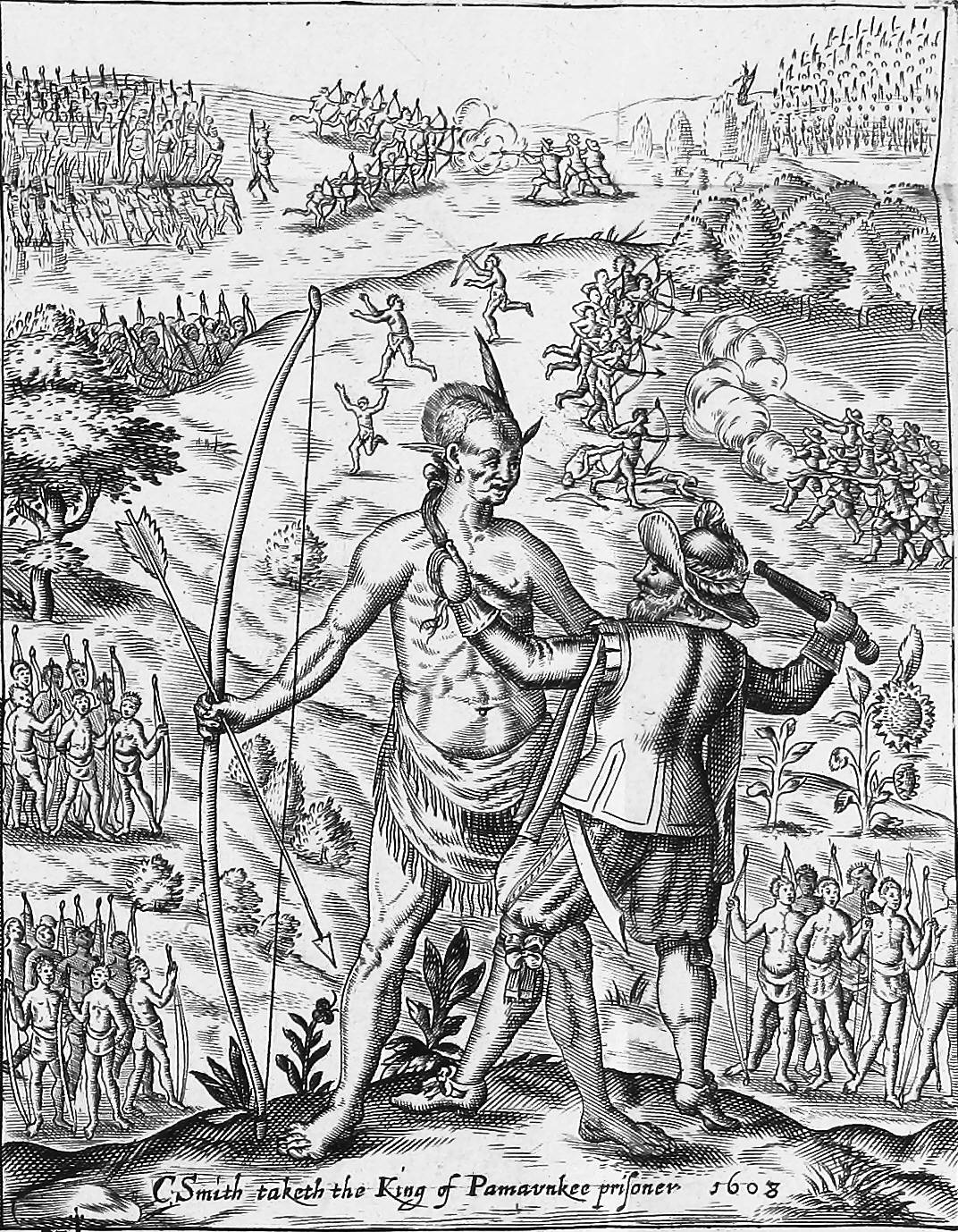
- 'John Smith taking the King of Pamunkey prisoner', a fanciful image of Opechancanough from Smith's General History of Virginia (1624). The image of Opechancanough is based on a 1585 painting of another native warrior by John White (see below)

Mamanatowick of the Powhatan Confederacy
- Preceded by: Opitchipam
- Succeeded by: Necotowance

Personal details
- Born: c. 1554
- Died: 1646 (aged 92) Jamestown, Colony of Virginia, British America
- Cause of death: Shot in the back while a prisoner
- Resting place: Pamunkey Reservation, King William, Virginia, U.S.
- Relatives: Chief Powhatan (brother); Pocahontas (niece); John Rolfe (nephew-in-law)

Military service
- Allegiance: Powhatan Confederacy
- Battles/wars: Anglo-Powhatan Wars

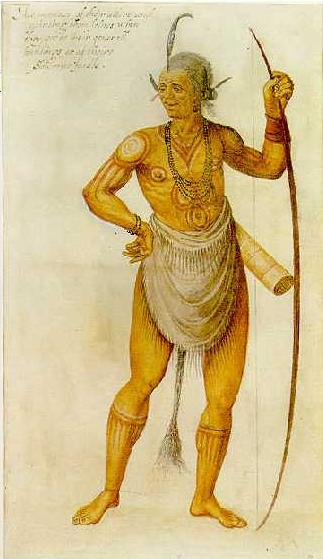
A 1585 painting of a Chesapeake Bay warrior by John White; this painting was adapted to represent Opechancanough in the engraving above.

Opechancanough (/oʊpəˈtʃænkənoʊ/ oh-pə-CHAN-kə-noh; b. 1554 – d. 1646) was the Mamanatowick (leader) of the Powhatan Confederacy in present-day Virginia from 1618 until his death. He had been a leader in the confederacy led previously by his older brother Powhatan.

Opechancanough led the Powhatan in the second and third Anglo-Powhatan Wars, including the Indian massacre of 1622.

In 1646, the aged Opechancanough was captured by English colonists and taken to Jamestown, where he was killed by a settler assigned to guard him.

== Name ==
The name Opechancanough means "He whose Soul is White" in the Powhatan language.

It was likely derived from a Powhatan original phonemically spelled as /a·pečehčakeno·w/ < a·pe "white" + čehčak "soul" + -en "inanimate verb ending" + -o·w "3rd person transitive inanimate subject". This would have the reconstructed pronunciation [ɔpət͡ʃəht͡ʃakənoːw] or perhaps [ɔpət͡ʃãkə̃noːw] with nasal spreading and haplology.

Before the 1622 massacre, Opechancanough ceremoniously changed his name "Mangopeesomon".

== Powhatan warrior ==
The Powhatan Confederacy was established in the late 16th and early 17th centuries under the leadership of Chief Wahunsonacock (more commonly known as Chief Powhatan, named for the tribe he originally led, which was based near present-day Richmond, Virginia). Over a period of years, through negotiation, Chief Powhatan united more than 31 of the Virginia Indian tribal groups in the Tidewater region of what is now the Commonwealth of Virginia, essentially the southeastern portion of the modern state.

At the time of the English settlement at Jamestown, which was established in May 1607, Opechancanough was a much-feared warrior and a charismatic leader of the Powhatans. As Chief Powhatan's younger brother (or possibly half-brother), he was sachem of a tribe situated along the Pamunkey River near the present-day town of West Point.

Known to be strongly opposed to European settlers, he captured Captain John Smith along the Chickahominy River and brought him before Chief Powhatan at Werowocomoco, one of the Powhatans' two capital villages. Located along the northern shore of the present-day York River, Werowocomoco is thought to be where Powhatan's young daughter Matoaka (known as Pocahontas to historians) intervened on Smith's behalf during a ceremony, based upon Smith's account.

Written accounts by other colonists confirm that Pocahontas later served as an intermediary between the natives and the colonists, and helped deliver crucial food during the winter of 1607–08, when the colonists' fort at Jamestown Island burned in an accidental fire in January.

The marriage of Pocahontas and colonist John Rolfe in April 1614 brought a period of peace; this ended not long after her death while on a trip to England and the death of her father, Wahunsonacock, in 1618. A short time later, after a brief succession of the chiefdom by his older brother Opitchapam (during which Opechancanough was war chief), Opechancanough became the Mamanatowick of the Powhatan Confederacy.

== Powhatan chief ==
The natives and the colonists came into increasingly irreconcilable conflict as tobacco (which had been first developed by Rolfe) became the colony's cash crop. The relationship became even more strained as ever-increasing numbers of Europeans arrived and began establishing "hundreds" and plantations along the navigable rivers.

Beginning with the Indian massacre of 1622, in which his forces killed many settlers, Chief Opechancanough abandoned diplomacy with the English colonists as a means of settling conflicts and tried to force them to abandon the region altogether. On March 22, 1622, approximately a third of the settlers in Virginia were killed by Powhatan forces during a series of coordinated attacks along both shores of the James River, extending from Newport News Point, near the mouth of the river, to Falling Creek, near the Fall Line at the head of navigation. But the colony eventually rebounded, and colonists later killed hundreds of natives in retaliation, including many warriors poisoned by Dr. John Pott at Jamestown.

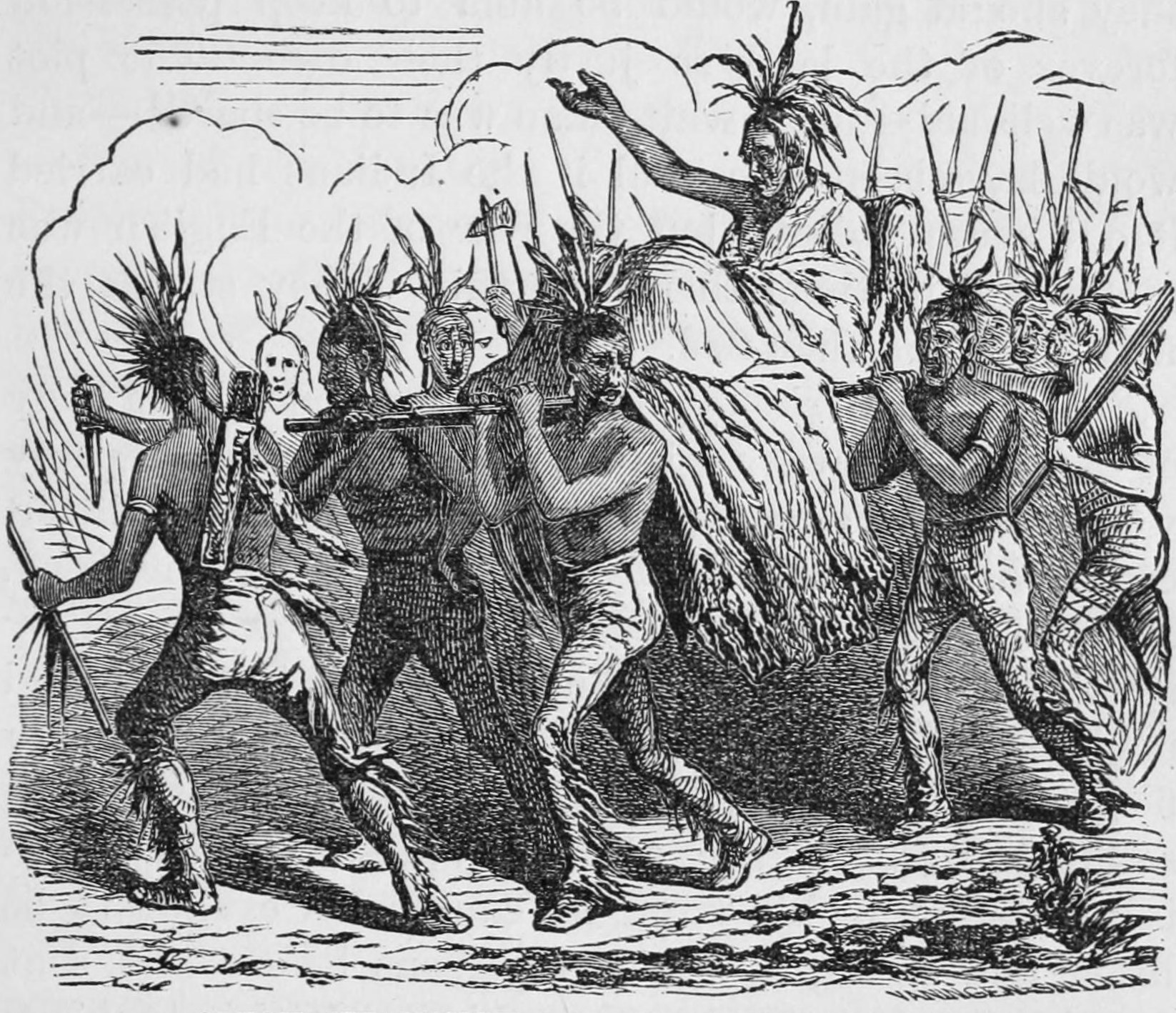
Opechankanough [sic] leading his warriors, circa 1644

Chief Opechancanough launched a last major effort to expel the colonists on April 18, 1644, the third Anglo-Powhatan War. In 1646, forces under Royal Governor William Berkeley captured Opechancanough, at the time believed to be between 90 and 100 years old. They paraded him as a prisoner through Jamestown before a jeering crowd, and he was subsequently killed by a settler who shot him in the back while assigned to guard him in prison. Before dying, Opechancanough reportedly said, "If it had been my fortune to take Sir William Berkeley prisoner, I would not have meanly exposed him as a show to my people."

He was succeeded as weroance first by Nectowance, then by Totopotomoi, then by Cockacoeske, Totopotomoi's wife, who is believed to be Opechancanough's daughter or granddaughter.

== Connection with Don Luis ==
Historians, including Carl Bridenbaugh, have speculated that Opechancanough was the same Native American youth who was a chief's son and is known to have been transported voluntarily from the village of Kiskiack, Virginia, to Spain in the 16th century at the age of 17 and educated. He became known as Don Luis. Murrin, however, suggests that Opechancanough was more likely Don Luis's nephew or cousin.

Rechristened as Don "Luis", the young man returned to his homeland in what is now the Virginia Peninsula subregion of the Hampton Roads region of Virginia, where Jesuit priests established Ajacán Mission in September 1570. Shortly thereafter, Don Luis is believed to have returned to live with the Powhatan and turned against the Europeans. He and his allies killed the Jesuits at the mission in the winter of 1571, ending Spanish efforts to colonize the area.

Other historians speculate that Don Luis may have become the father of Powhatan chiefs Wahunsunacock and Opechancanough. Their remains are buried on the Pamunkey Indian Reservation in King William, Virginia.

== Illness ==
From various contemporary reports, it is speculated that Opechancanough suffered from myasthenia gravis. These reports include symptoms of weakness which improved with resting, and visible drooping of the eyelids.

== Representations ==
- Opechancanough was portrayed by Stuart Randall in the 1953 low-budget film Captain John Smith and Pocahontas. The film shortened his name to Opechanco.
- He appeared as a figure in the Animated Hero Classics 1994 episode "Pocahontas," and was voiced by Lorenzo Gonzalez, but is entirely absent in Disney's 1995 animated film Pocahontas as well as its 1998 direct-to-video sequel Pocahontas II: Journey to a New World.
- Opechancanough is portrayed by Wes Studi in Terrence Malick's 2005 film The New World. In this live-action film, he is conflated with Tomocomo, a priest who accompanied Pocahontas/Rebecca to London.
- In the Sky TV show Jamestown, he is played by Raoul Max Trujillo.

== See also ==
- History of Virginia
- Nemattanew

Preceded by Opitchipam	Weroance of the Pamunkey; 1618–1646	Succeeded by Necotowance
