= Arrohattoc =

Historical Native American tribe in Virginia, U.S.

Arrohateck
Total population
- Extinct

Regions with significant populations
- Eastern Virginia

Languages
- Powhatan

Religion
- Indigenous religion

Related ethnic groups
- Pamunkey, Patawomeck, Chickahominy, and other Algonquian peoples

The Arrohattoc, also occasionally spelled Arrohateck, was a Native American tribe from Henrico County, Virginia in the United States.

In the early 18th century, the tribe was led by their chief Ashuaquid and was part of the Powhatan Confederacy. Their main village was located on the James River, the location of which is now the site of Henrico, Virginia.

== History ==
=== 17th century ===
In 1607 the tribe came into contact with Christopher Newport and John Smith, who were exploring the area with a small group of men associated with the Virginia Company of London. The group was given a warm welcome by the Arrohattocs, a reception that they enjoyed when they continued up the James River and arrived at another village, which was ruled over by Powhatan's son Parahunt, also known as Tanx (meaning "Little") Powhatan. The tribe would also continue to help the settlers when their fort was attacked by hostile Indians later that same year.

However, as time progressed relations between the Arrohattocs and English colonists deteriorated, and by 1609 the tribe was unwilling to trade with the settlers. As the population began to dwindle, the tribe declined and was last mentioned in a 1610 report by the visiting William Strachey. By 1611 the tribe's Henrico town was found to be deserted when Sir Thomas Dale went to use the land to found Henricus.

== See also ==
- History of Richmond, Virginia
