= Totopotomoi =

17th-century Native American leader

Totopotomoi (c. 1615–1656) was a Native American leader from what is now Virginia. He served as the weroance of Pamunkey and as mamanatowick of the Powhatan Confederacy from 1649 to 1656, when he died in the Battle of Bloody Run.

== Name ==
Totopotomoi is also spelled "Totopotomoy" and pronounced "To-to-POT-omy." English colonists of his time often spelled his name "Totopotomy". Totopotomy Creek in Hanover and Stafford counties memorializes his name.

== Personal life ==
Totopotomoi's parentage and date of birth are not known and have never been proved, but multiple theories have been put forth. Many assume he is the son of Necotowance because he succeeded him as weroance. However, the Pamunkey and other tribes of Tidewater, Virginia were matrilineal societies. The right to become weroance was passed down through the mother, not the father, and often from one brother to another, sons of the same mother. This is why Totopotomoi is believed to be Necotowance's brother and not his son. In one recently self-published book the author repeats an old theory that claims Totopotomoi was the son of Thomas West, 3rd Baron De La Warr, one of the early governors of the Virginia Colony, by a Powhatan woman who the author identifies as having a possible name of "Elizabeth" or Noy, who may have been one of the young Powhatan women who accompanied Pocahontas and John Rolfe on their 1616 visit to England.

Totopotomoi married Cockacoeske, who became Weroansqua (female weroance) of the Pamunkey after her husband's death and was better known by English colonists in Virginia as "Queen Cockacoeske of the Pamunkey".

== Political career ==
Totopotomoi became the Mamanatowick of the Powhatan Confederacy, a confederacy of Native American tribes in Virginia, in about 1649 upon the death of Nectowance.

Totopotomoi's community controlled lands that are now in New Kent County, Virginia, including that part of New Kent which is now Hanover. After the death of Opechancanough, the once powerful Confederacy disintegrated and the member tribes were eradicated by colonial expansion or absorbed into other tribes. Seeing the futility of opposing them, Totopotomoi became a staunch ally of the Virginian colonists and often sided with them in conflicts. The allied Monacan and Manahoac confederacies were constantly at war with the Powhatan and the Iroquois. In the 16th century, the powerful Haudenosaunee Confederacy fought against these tribes to the south, causing others to flee, and eventually to merge for protection.

== Military service ==
About 1654, six or seven hundred members of the Shackoconian tribe of the Manahoac confederacy in search of a new dwelling place, moved down near the falls of the James River. The colonists in nearby Richmond were uneasy with the proximity of a new potentially hostile force. In 1656, the Virginia General Assembly commissioned Colonel Edward Hill to remove the Indian presence. His orders specifically stated that he was not to use force unless necessary, and that war should only be a last resort. The General Assembly sent messages to Totopotomoi requesting he lend Hill assistance, which he did.

Colonel Hill led the Colonial Rangers, reinforced by 100 Pamunkey warriors under Totopotomoi. At a place along the James River, near the falls, at a point in the eastern limits of present-day Richmond, Virginia, five "Richahecrian" leaders came to negotiate, and contrary to his orders, Hill ordered they be taken and killed. What resulted was one of the bloodiest Native American battles ever fought on the soil of Virginia, and the last great fight between the Eastern Siouan and the Algonquian-speaking peoples, the Battle of Bloody Run.

During the battle, Hill and his men retreated, resulting in the slaughter of their Indian allies, including Totopotomoi himself. The large number of casualties, nearly all the Pamunkey warriors, and a good part of the Colonial Rangers, earned the site its name of Bloody Run, as the creek was said to have run red with blood.

After the tremendous defeat, Hill was censured by the Virginia Assembly, stripped of his rank and had to personally pay for the English cost of the battle. The Pamunkey Tribe were never compensated for their losses or for the death of their leader Totopotomoi. Cockacoeske, Totopotomoi's widow, reminded the Virginia General Assembly of this 20 years later when they again requested assistance during Bacon's Rebellion.

== Succession ==
Upon the death of her husband, Cockacoeske became the weroansqua of the Pamunkey. Over the thirty-year span of her leadership, she worked within the English colonial system to recapture the former power of Opechancanough, to protect her people by maintaining a peaceful unity among the tribes under her control. The Powhatan Confederacy was dissolved and the tribes absorbed into other tribes. The Treaty of Middle Plantation, signed on May 29, 1677, nominally made the tribes subjects of the British Crown, and relinquished their remaining claims to their ancestral lands. In return they were to be protected from the remaining hostile tribes and guaranteed a limited amount of reserved land, the first Native American reservations to be established in America.

Preceded by Necotowance 1646 (died 1647)	Weroance of the Pamunkey; 1649–1656	Succeeded by Cockacoeske

== Sources ==
- "Middle Peninsula Historic Marker "Cockacoeske"
- "The Powhatan Indians of Virginia: Their Traditional Culture. Rountree, Helen C., University of Oklahoma Press, 1989.
- "Cockacoeske, Queen of Pamunkey: Diplomat and Suzeraine." W. Martha W. McCartney.
- "Powhatan's Mantle: Indians in the Colonial Southeast by Peter H. Wood.
- "A Brief Outline of Recorded History of the Patawomeck Tribe." Deyo, William L., 2000.
- "Monteith Family and the Potomac Indians." Deyo, William L., 1991.
