= Orapax Farms, Virginia =

Unincorporated community in Virginia, US

Coordinates: 37°32′02″N 77°12′20″W

Orapax Farms is an unincorporated community in New Kent County, Virginia, United States.
