= Cockacoeske =

Native American leader (17th C)

Cockacoeskie
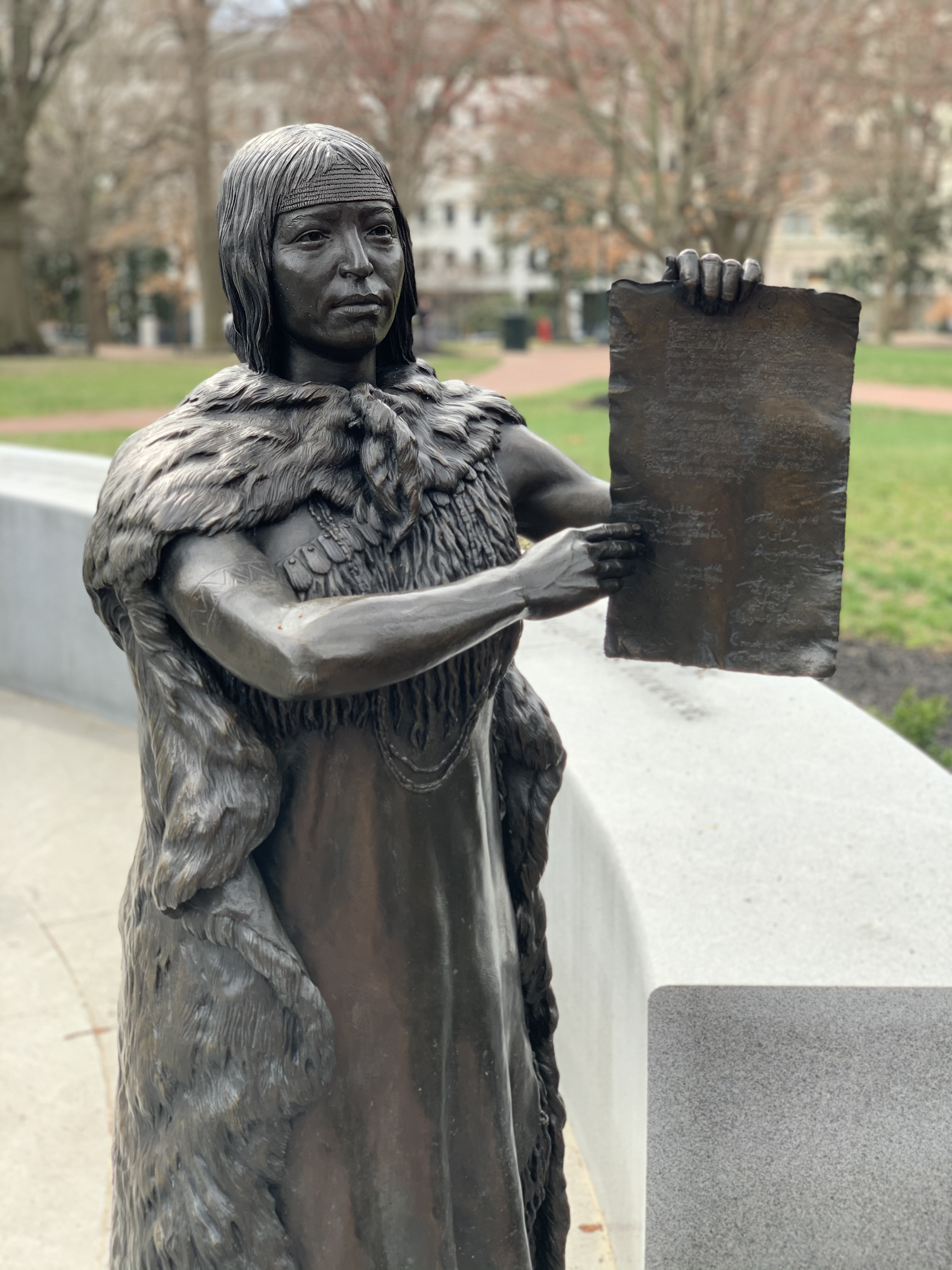
- Statue of Cockacoeske included in the Virginia Women's Monument.

Pamunkey leader
- Preceded by: Totopotomoi
- Succeeded by: Betty

Personal details
- Born: ca. 1640 Pamunkey Neck, Virginia
- Died: 1686
- Spouse: Totopotomoi
- Children: John West
- Known for: First signatory of the Treaty of 1677

Cockacoeske (pronounced Coke a cow ski) (also spelled Cockacoeskie) (c. 1640 – c. 1686) was a 17th-century leader, titled weroansqua, of the Pamunkey in what is now the U.S. state of Virginia and asserted herself as Mamanatowick of the Confederacy. During her thirty-year reign, she worked with the English colony of Virginia, trying to recapture the former power of past mamanatowicks and maintain peaceful unity among the several tribes under her leadership. She was the first of the tribal leaders to sign the Virginia-Indian Treaty of Middle Plantation. In 2004 Cockacoeske was honored as one of the Library of Virginia's "Virginia Women in History".

== Early life and rule ==
The death of Opechancanough in 1646 led to the disintegration of the confederacy built by his brother Powhatan. Cockacoeske's husband Totopotomoi became leader in 1649, but English colonists in Virginia only referred to him the "king of the Pamunkeys," not "king of the Indians," as they had earlier chiefs. Totopotomoi was killed in what was later called the Battle of Bloody Run, while fighting alongside the Virginia militia against migrating Westo.

A descendant of Opechancanough herself, Cockacoeske became the solitary werowansqua of the Pamunkey and the colonial government of Virginia recognized her as the "Queen" of Pamunkey. She remained in power for nearly thirty years, living in the land between the Pamunkey and Mattaponi Rivers on land ceded to them after the end of the war in 1646 (land later designated as the Pamunkey Indian Reservation).

The biggest threat to peace during her rule came during Bacon's Rebellion, a multiracial uprising of disaffected groups led by Nathaniel Bacon. Although of the wealthy planter class, Bacon competed for power with Gov. Berkeley, drawing upon resentments among frontier settlers about poor land and the colonial government's protection of allied Indian nations who raided frontier settlements in retaliation for their land grabs. Cockacoeske soon after heard from Governor Berkeley's faction as he sought help from the Pamunkey in this new conflict. So she went to the statehouse in Jamestown to answer the request, dressed in her finest state regalia: Wampum, a fringed deerskin mantle, and accompanied by an interpreter and several retainers, including her son.

Told that she must honor treaty obligations by supplying warriors for Berkeley, Cockacoeske played the consummate diplomat. She was the one to inform them of her husband's death. In doing so, Queen Cockacoeske successfully shamed her audience for their inattention to her own people's survival. As Martha McCartney asserted, this was "a reminder to the council that it was in identical circumstances that her husband and a hundred of his bowmen had lost their lives, for which sacrifice there had been no compensation." When Martha asked once more what she and her people would contribute, Cockacoeske responded with disdain that she would only send a small number of people.

Bacon's first attacks were against the Pamunkey, who fled into the Dragon Swamp. As Cockacoeske and her people abandoned their camp, they were chased by Bacon's followers, who captured one of the Queen's attendants and tried to coerce her to bring them to the Pamunkey, but she led them astray, and they killed her. Cockacoeske asked for help from the Governor's Council, and eventually the Assembly sent an unsuccessful naval expedition against Bacon's camp in Maryland. After Bacon died of disease, the rebellion gradually fizzled out. Crown officials appointed a commission which criticized both parties for their mistreatment of the Pamunkey and other friendly Indian tribes, and stressed the importance of restoring peace to the region.

== Treaty of Middle Plantation ==
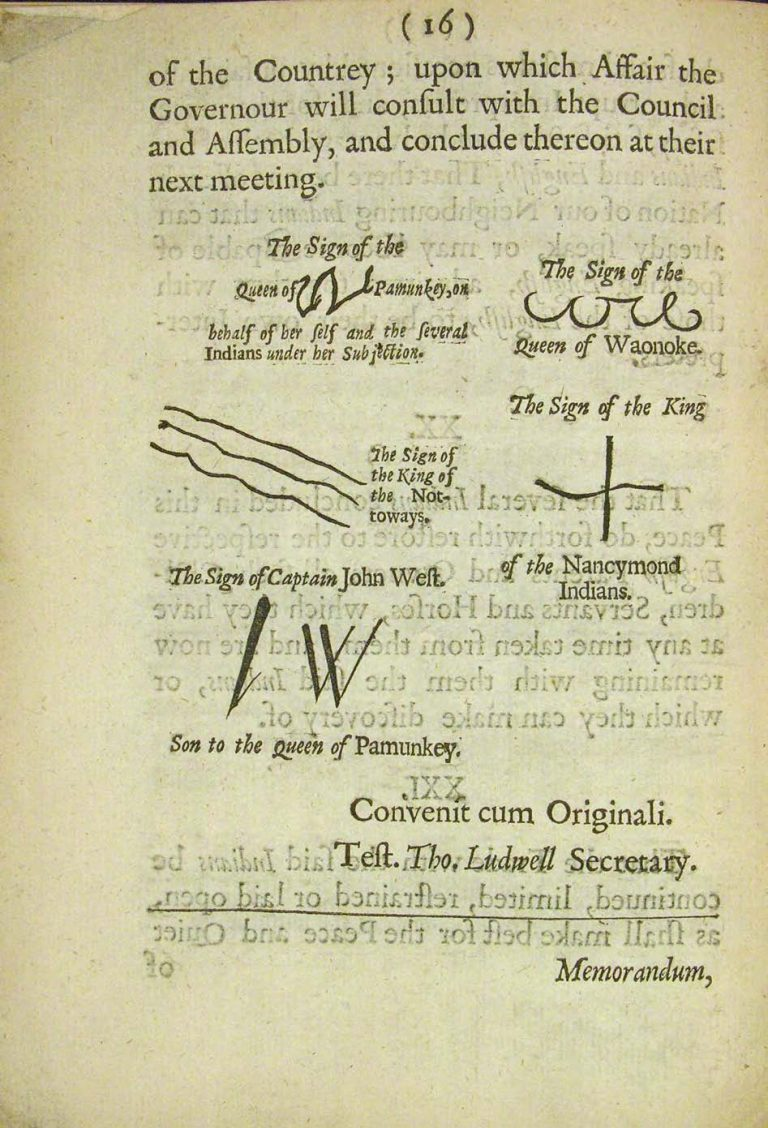
Signatures to the Treaty of Middle Plantation 1677

Cockacoeske and her son John West signed the Treaty of Middle Plantation with new Virginia Governor Jeffreys on May 29, 1677, forged after almost a month of negotiations that commenced on May 5. In the treaty, Indian leaders like Cockacoeske accepted their de facto position as subjects of the Crown, and gave up their remaining claims to their ancestral land, in return for protection from the remaining hostile Indians and a guarantee of a limited amount of reserved land. Yet the treaty also strengthened alliances between Indian groups fractured by the wars, and dictated rights and responsibilities of the English colonists in return. Cockacoaeske, called "Queen of the Pamunkey," was the first signatory, a reflection of her strong negotiating position and ability to claim other tributary groups under her leadership. (Only four people's marks were included in the printed version of the treaty published in London, including Cockacoeske's son John West, the Queen of the Weyanokes and the king of the Nansemonds. The full list of signatories includes Peracuta, King of Appomattux; Pattanochus, King of Nansaticoen; Shurenough, King of the Manakina; Mastegone, young King of the Sappones; Tachapoake, Chiefe man of the Sappones; Tachapoake, Chief man of the Meherians; Norehannah, next Chiefe man of the Meherians. Given Cockacoeske's prominence, King Charles II had a medal fashioned specifically for her to be worn in recognition of her help securing the treaty.

The treaty text shows that Cockacoeske intended to take on a role more than just as Queen of the Pamunkey. She influenced the wording of Article 12, which stated that "each Indian King and Queen have equal power to govern their owne people and none to have greater power than other except the Queen of Pamunkey to whom several scattered Indian Nations doe now againe owne their antient subjection...." This "ancient subjection" was an allusion to the powerful states created and sustained by Powhatan and Opechancanough, and historians believe that the several "scattered nations" Cockacoeske claimed as tributary were the Chickahominys and Rappahannocks, perhaps also the Chiskiacks, Totachus, and Mattaponys. Three other local Indian groups joined the treaty by 1780. But almost immediately after the treaty was signed, some among the Chickahominys and Rappahannocks resisted Cockacoeske's demands for tribute and obedience, asserting they had not paid such tribute for many years, and complaining that she had executed some Chickahominys. Virginia officials nonetheless expressed confidence in Cockacoeske's leadership, although they complained about Article 18 of the treaty, which had designated the colonial government the arbiters of inter-tribal grievances, when they would just as rather allow them to "weaken themselves... by their Intestine Broyls." Cockacoeske tried to utilize colonial arbitration several times in 1678 to enforce the tribute clauses of the Treaty of 1677, but it appears that the Chicahominys and Rappahonnocks successfully rejected her claims of sovereignty over them, much as they had done to the Powhatan in the years of his chieftaincy.

== Descendants and succession ==
The English's Colonial records document only one child, John West, born to Cockacoeske and John West II. However, Pamunkey record and tradition and later genealogical evidence indicate additional children such as Susannah who were not recorded by the English traditions. Her son John West, was born around 1656–57 and "reputed the son of an English colonel." On the basis of his name, and birth after her husband's death, he has often been considered the son of John West, who established a plantation (now the town of West Point at the confluence of the Mattaponi and Pamunkey Rivers, where they form the York River), or his son John West. The Virginia-Indian Treaty of 1677/1680, which this youth signed, identified him as "Cap't John West, sonne to the Queen of Pamunkey."

Cockacoeske died in 1686, and, as this was a matrilineal society, was succeeded by her niece, Betty.

Preceded by Totopotomoi	Weroansqua of the Pamunkey; 1656–1686	Succeeded by Betty
