= Battle of Bloody Run (1656) =

Battle involving colonists and indigenous peoples fought near Richmond, Virginia

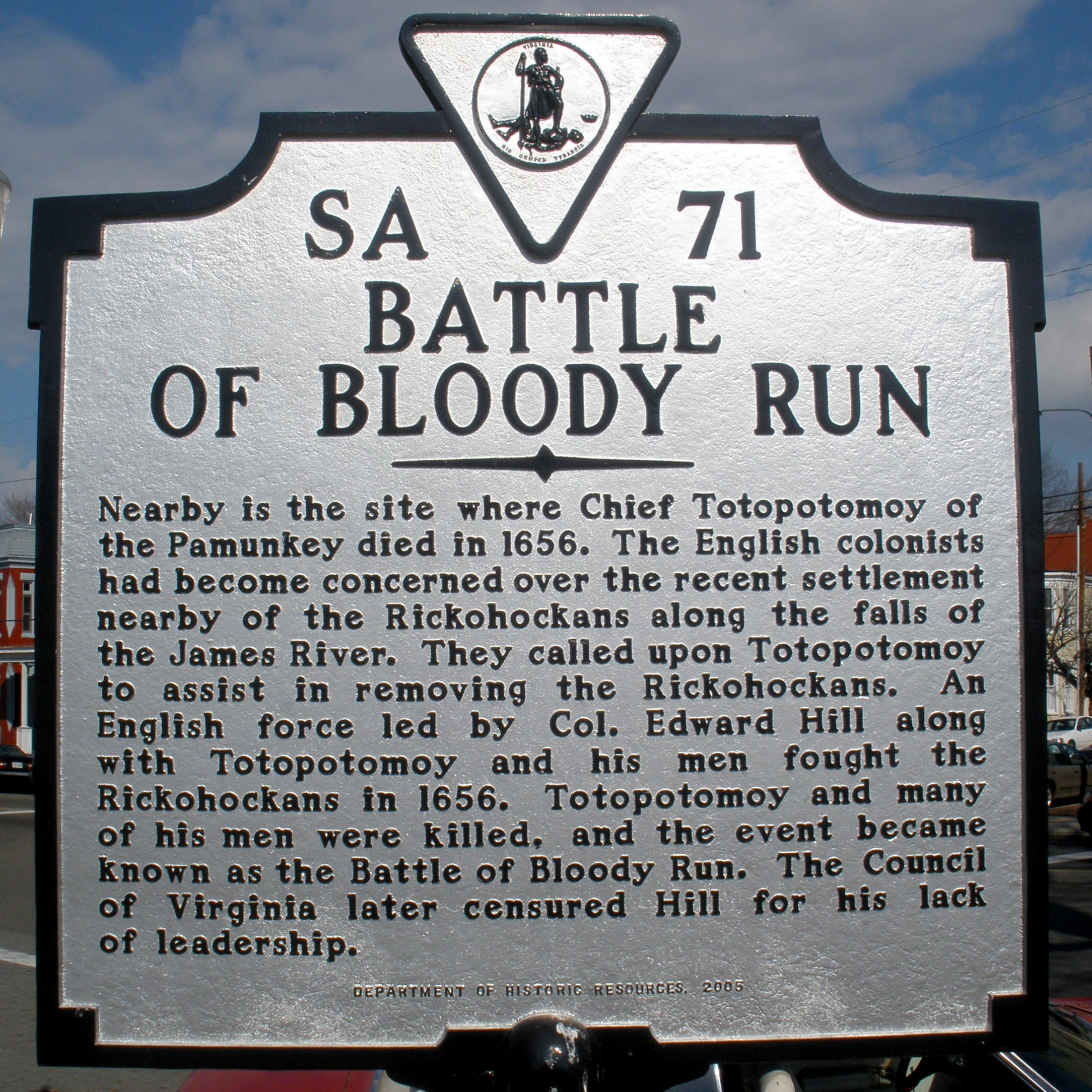
- a marker erected concerning the battle
Date	1656
Location	Bloody Run Creek, currently paved over, previously near 32nd Street, Richmond, Virginia
Result	"Richahecrian" victory

Belligerents
"Richahecrian" tribe	Virginia Colony; Pamunkey tribe

Commanders and leaders
Unknown	Colonel Edward Hill; Chief Totopotomoi †

Strength
500–600	~200 (100 Colonial Rangers and 100 Pamunkey warriors) 37°31′39″N 77°24′45″W

The Battle of Bloody Run was fought in March or April 1656 near Richmond, Virginia.

In 1654, the expansion of the Iroquois Nation (during the Beaver Wars) displaced several tribes from their homelands around Lake Erie. Some survivors, most likely of the Erie tribe, moved south into Virginia, settling temporarily around the James River. Records of the time refer to these people as the "Richahecrians", while James Lederer said they were "Mahocks and Nahyssans". The colonists in nearby Richmond were uneasy with the proximity of a potentially hostile force. Within two years, the Virginia General Assembly had given permission to Colonel Edward Hill to remove the Indian presence. His orders specifically stated that he was not to use force unless necessary. The General Assembly also specifically sent messages to Chief Totopotomoi and the Chichahominy Indians, requesting their assistance.

Colonel Hill led the Colonial Rangers, reinforced by 100 Pamunkey warriors under Chief Totopotomoi. During the battle, Hill and his men retreated, resulting in the slaughter of their Indian allies, including Totopotomoi himself. The large number of casualties—nearly all of the Pamunkey warriors, and a good part of the Colonial Rangers—earned the site its name of Bloody Run, as the creek was said to have run red with blood. Afterward, Hill was disgraced because of his defeat, censured by the Virginia Assembly, and stripped of his rank.

The creek was the site of another bloody battle 20 years later, during Bacon’s Rebellion, in 1676. More Indian incursions led the Virginia colonists to authorize Nathaniel Bacon to march against the Indians. The battle of Bacon’s Quarter Branch took place near Bloody Run, and the creek was once again christened with blood.

Today, the site of the battle had been paved over and the creek and spring have dried up. The only indication of the site is a state-erected marker commemorating the event in the northwest corner of Chimborazo Park.
