= Pamunkey =

Federally recognized tribe in Virginia, U.S.

Pamunkey Indian Tribe
Total population
- Enrolled citizens: 430

Regions with significant populations
- Pamunkey Indian Reservation, Virginia, U.S.

Languages
- English, formerly Pamunkey

Religion
- Christianity; Indigenous

Related ethnic groups
- Mattaponi, Chickahominy, Patawomeck

The Pamunkey Indian Tribe is a federally recognized tribe of Pamunkey people in Virginia. They control the Pamunkey Indian Reservation in King William County, Virginia. Historically, they spoke the Pamunkey language.

They are one of 11 Native American tribes in Virginia and an Indigenous people of the Northeastern Woodlands. The tribe became the Commonwealth of Virginia's first federally recognized tribe receiving its status in January 2016.

The Pamunkey people were part of the Powhatan Confederacy, made up various nations in Tsenacommacah. The Powhatan Confederacy was made up of over 30 nations, estimated to total about 10,000 to 15,000 people at the time the English arrived in 1607. The Pamunkey nation comprised about one-tenth to one-fifteenth of the total. They numbered about 1,000 persons in 1607.

When the English colonists arrived, the Pamunkey were one of the most powerful nations in the Powhatan Confederacy. They inhabited the coastal tidewater of Virginia on the north side of the James River near Chesapeake Bay.

The Pamunkey Tribe is one of only two that retain the reservation lands assigned by the 1646 and 1677 treaties with the English colonial government. Their reservation is located on some of their ancestral land on the Pamunkey River adjacent to present-day King William County.

== Language ==
The Pamunkey language is generally assumed to have been similar in nature to Algonquian languages, but only fourteen words have been preserved. The words, which were recorded in 1844 by Reverend E.A. Dalrymple S.T.D., are,

tonshee 'son', nucksee 'daughter', petucka 'cat', kayyo 'thankfulness', o-ma-yah 'O my Lord', kenaanee 'friendship', baskonee 'thank you', eeskut 'go out dog', nikkut 'one', orijak 'two', kiketock 'three', mitture 'four', nahnkitty 'five', vomtally 'six', talliko 'seven', tingdum 'eight', yantay 'ten'.

Except for nikkut 'one', which is clearly similar to Powhatan nekut, none of the words correspond to any known Algonquian language, or to reconstructions of proto-Algonquian. Given the extensive ethnic mixing that occurred among the Pamunkey before 1844, it's possible that Dalrymple's list is from an inter-ethnic pidgin or even a language from an otherwise unknown language family, rather than from the original Pamunkey language.

== Way of living ==
=== Subsistence and relationship to the land ===
The traditional Pamunkey way of life was subsistence living. They lived through a combination of fishing, trapping, hunting, and farming. The latter was developed in the late Woodland Period of culture, roughly the years 900 to 1600. The peoples used the Pamunkey River as a main mode of transportation and food source. The river also provided access to hunting grounds, and other tribes. Access to the river was crucial, because Pamunkey villages were seldom permanent settlements. Because the Pamunkey people did not use fertilizers, they moved their fields and homes about every ten years to allow land to lie fallow and recover from cultivation.

The Pamunkey, and all Virginia tribes, had an intimate, balanced relationship with the animals, plants, and the geography of their homeland. Like other native tribes, they had techniques, such as controlled burning, to clear land for cultivation or hunting. The land belonged to the group as a whole. The chief and council would allot a parcel of cleared ground to a family head for life.

Differing concepts of land and farm animal ownership and use caused some conflicts between the Virginia tribes and English colonists. For native tribes, the land was "owned" only as long as it was farmed; after that, it was available for "public" use. The Englishmen had, instead, laws on private property and believed that the land was theirs as soon as the tribe sold it to them. As a result, when Englishmen allowed land to lie fallow, Native Americans assumed they were free to use it for hunting and gathering. Many Englishmen considered both as encroachments on their private property.

=== Homes ===
Pamunkey homes, called yehakins, were long and narrow; they were described as "longhouses" by English colonists. They were structures made from bent saplings lashed together at the top to make a barrel shape. Indians covered the saplings with woven mats or bark. The 17th-century historian William Strachey thought that bark was harder to acquire, as he noticed that only higher-status families owned bark-covered houses. In summer, when the heat and humidity increased, the mats could be rolled up or removed to allow more air circulation.

Inside the house, they built bedsteads along both walls. They were made of posts put in the ground, about a foot high or more, with small poles attached. The framework was about four feet (1.2 m) wide, over which reeds were put. One or more mats were placed on top for bedding; more mats or skins served as blankets, with a rolled mat for a pillow. The bedding was rolled up and stored during the day to make the space available for other functions.

=== Government ===
The Pamunkey practice of matrilineal succession also created some confusion for Englishmen, who finally in the 1677 Treaty of Middle Plantation recognized the Pamunkey queen. As with other surviving members of the Powhatan Confederacy, the Pamunkey adopted a chief and a council composed of seven members, elected every four years. The chief and council execute all the tribal governmental functions as set forth by their laws. Elections used a basket, as well as peas and corn kernels, in the same number as voters. Members first voted for the chief, followed by votes for the seven council members. For each candidate, a corn kernel signified approbation and a pea a "no" vote, or if there were but two candidates, each could be indicated by a type of seed.

The same 1896 study noted that tribal laws were concerned with, but not limited to, controlling land use, stealing, and fighting (breaking the peace). Instead of using corporal punishment, incarceration, or chastisement, anyone who broke a tribal law was fined or banished. Because the Pamunkey resented that, in the past, outsiders picked out some laws for ridicule, no outsiders are now allowed to see tribal laws.

Tribal laws govern all civil matters. In criminal matters, outside authorities such as a Sheriff or Police, may respectfully notify the Tribal Chief about serving a warrant. But, such action is not legally required. The tribe does not operate a police force or jail. Most tribal members obey the tribal laws out of respect for the chief and the council. The tribe discourages verbal attacks against members. As the former Chief Brown explains, they have strict slander laws because, "We're like a 400-year-old subdivision. If we didn't get along we'd have probably killed each other long before now." The chief continued to pay the annual tribute to Virginia's governor. This consists of game, usually a deer, and pottery or a "peace pipe". The Pamunkey have been paying such tribute since the treaty of 1646. Making this annual payment has not always been easy. Former Chief Miles remembers one year that was particularly hard, "We couldn't find anything, no deer, no turkeys—nothing. My dad was chief then, and we knew we had to have something to present to the governor; so we went to a turkey farm, bought a live turkey, brought it back to the reservation and killed it. That way we were able to fulfill the terms of the treaty—after all it was killed on the reservation." As far as anyone knows, they have not missed a payment in 342 years.

== History ==
=== Precontact ===
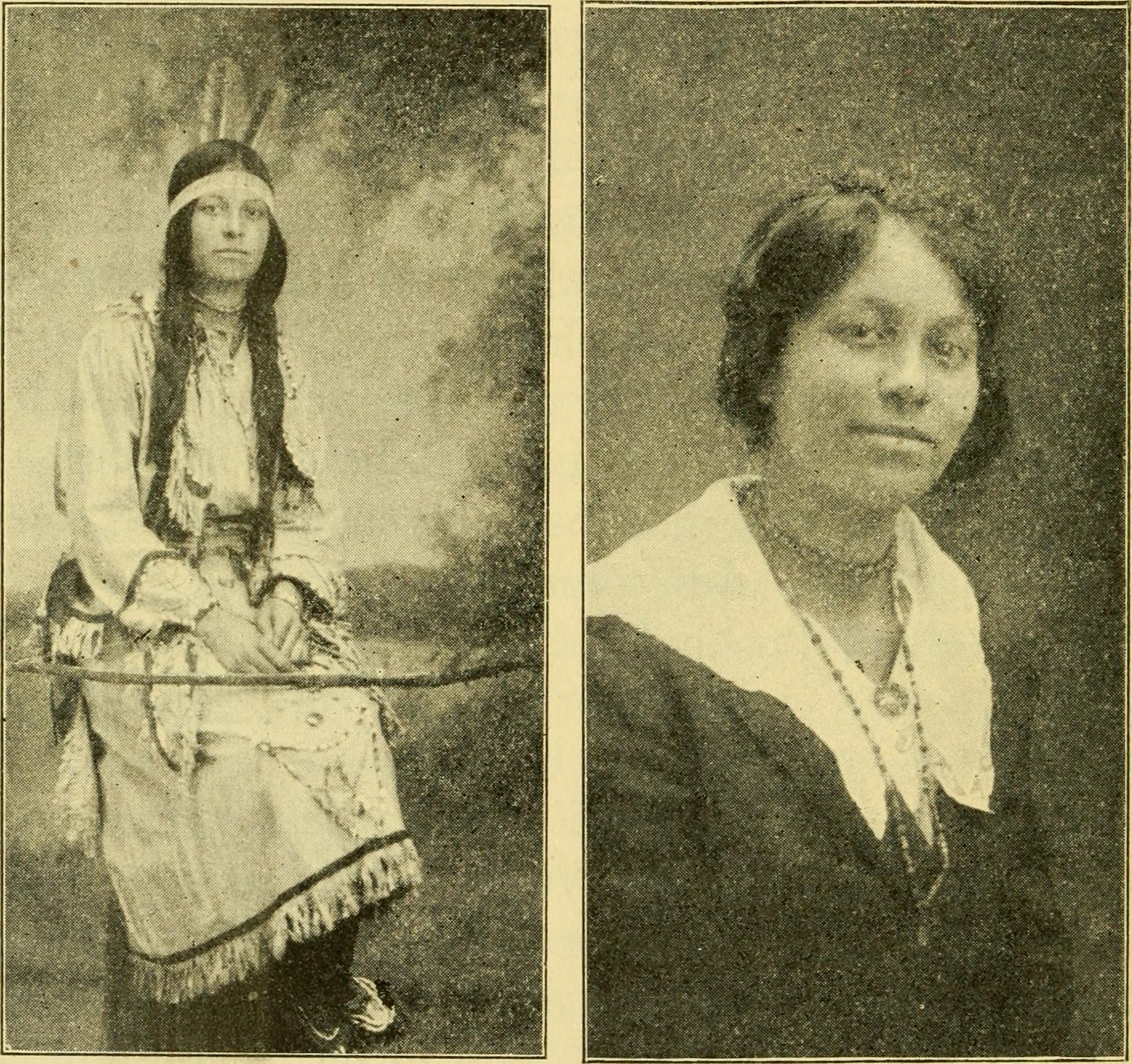
Photograph of a 20th-century Pamunkey girl; the text says she has a sister named Pocahontas. (from A History of Virginia for Boys and Girls (1920) by John Walter Wayland)

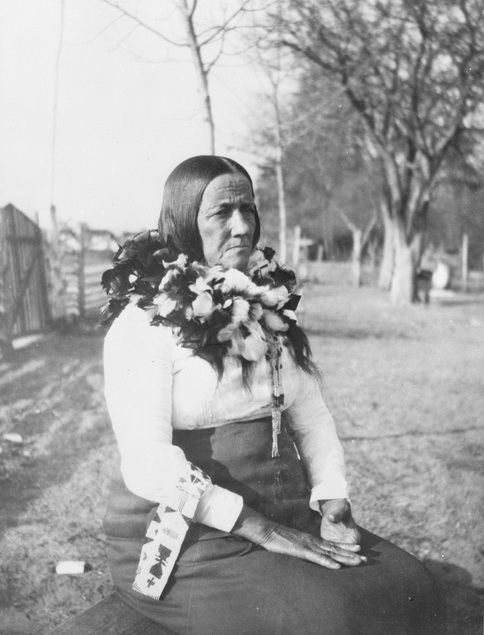
Theodora Octavia Dennis Cook, wife of Chief George Major Cook, wearing a woven feather neck ornament of wild turkey feathers, wild goose, and shelldrake or shellduck, ca. 1864-ca. 1935

In the pre-Columbian era, based on archaeological evidence, scholars estimate that various distinct cultures of American Indians occupied this part of the mid-Atlantic coast for more than 10,000 years before European contact. Evidence has been collected by archaeologists, anthropologists, and historians. Varying cultures of indigenous peoples of the Americas lived in the areas later occupied by the historic Pamunkey.

The Pamunkey are part of the larger Algonquian-speaking language family. This was composed of a number of tribes who spoke variations of the same language, a language now mostly lost. By 1607, more than 30 tribes were tributaries of the Algonquian Powhatan Confederacy, of which the Pamunkey were the largest and one of the most powerful. Powhatan and his daughter Matoaka (better known as Pocahontas to historians), who achieved historical fame, were the Pamunkey Indians. Captain Samuel Argall abducted her as a hostage in an attempt to secure the release of some English prisoners and ammunitions held by her father.

=== European Arrival ===
Initial contact with European Colonists was around 1570. "And from [1570] on at ever briefer intervals until the first permanent English colony was established at Jamestown in 1607, the Powhatan Confederacy was visited by white men: Spanish, French, and English." (Barbour, 5). Scholars estimate that when the English arrived in 1607, the country numbered about 14,000–21,000 people.

Colonists of the first successful English settlement, based at Jamestown, had a complicated relationship with Virginia's tribes. In the winter of 1607, Opechanacanough, Weroance of the Pamunkey tribe, captured Captain John Smith. Smith was brought to Opechancanough's brother, Powhatan. This first meeting between Powhatan and Smith resulted in an alliance between the two people. Powhatan sent Smith back to Jamestown in the spring of 1608 and started sending gifts of food to the colonists. If not for Powhatan's donations, the settlers would not have survived through the first winters. As the settlement expanded, competition for land and other resources, and conflict between the European settlers and Virginia tribes, had increased.

=== Gradual English colonization ===
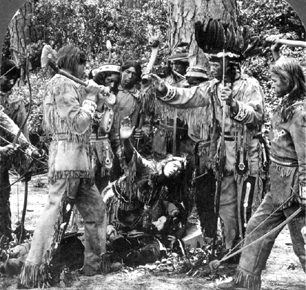
Pamunkey tribal members re-enact the story of Pocahantas – photo taken in 1910.

The story of Pocahontas (Matoaka) tells a piece of Pamunkey history, but from an English colonial perspective. Study of primary documents from the time of English arrival shows that initial contact was characterized by mutual cultural misunderstanding. Colonists portrayed the Virginia tribes by contrasts. They had respect for Powhatan, but characterized other American Indians by terms such as "naked devils". Their fear and appreciation of American Indians was coupled with distrust and unease. George Percy's account of the early years expresses such duality: "It pleased God, after a while, to send those people which were our mortal enemies to relieve us with victuals, as bread, corn fish, and flesh in great plenty, which was the setting up of our feeble men, otherwise we had all perished".

The colonists generally mistrusted most Indian tribes, but they noted the Pamunkey did not steal. "Their custom is to take anything they can seize off; only the people of Pamunkey we have not found stealing, but what others can steal, their king receiveth."

The Powhatan could not understand the violent tactics employed by the colonists. As one noted, "What it will avail you to take by force you may quickly have by love, or to destroy them that provide you food? What can you get by war, when we can hide our provisions and fly to the woods? Whereby you must famish by wronging us your friends. And why are you thus jealous of our loves seeing us unarmed, and both do, and are willing still to feed you, with that you cannot get but by our labors?" Smith included this translation of Powhatan's questions in his writings.

Powhatan's maternal half-brother and ultimate successor, Opechancanough, launched attacks in 1622 and 1644 as a result of English colonists encroaching on Powhatan lands. The first, known as the Indian massacre of 1622, destroyed colonial settlements such as Henricus and Wolstenholme Towne, and nearly wiped out the colony. Jamestown was spared in the attack of 1622 due to a warning. During each attack, about 350–400 settlers were killed. In 1622, the population had been 1,200, and in 1644, 8,000 prior to the attacks. Captured in 1646, Opechancanough was killed by a settler assigned to guard him, against orders. His death contributed to the decline of the Powhatan Confederacy.

In 1646, the first treaty was signed between the Opechancanough's successor, Necotowance, and the English. The treaty set up boundaries between lands set aside for the Virginia tribes and those that were now considered property of English colonists, reservations lands, and yearly tribute payment of fish and game (made to the English). These boundaries could not be crossed unless it was on official business and badges had to be worn to illustrate the point. During the late 17th and early 18th centuries, English settlers continued to expand the colony of Virginia, even further by displacing the Pamunkey and making it impossible for them to sustain their traditional practices.

=== Bacon's Rebellion ===
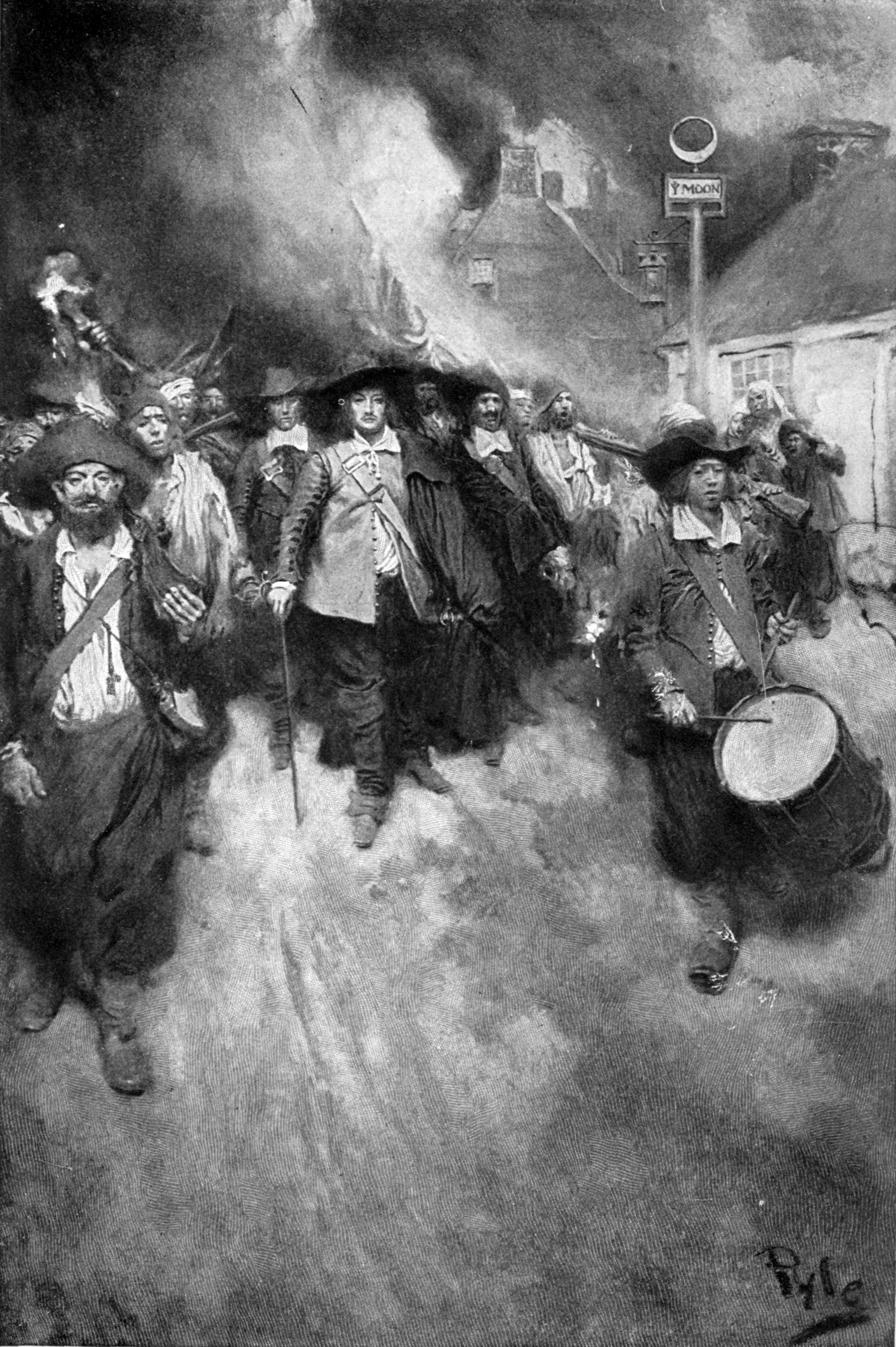
The Bacon's Rebellion (1675), featured a coalition of multiracial laborers, including women, against the Colony of Virginia's aristocracy represented by Governor Berkeley – Painting made in 1905 by Howard Pyle.

Bacon's Rebellion, which began in 1675, resulted in attacks on several tribes that were loyal to the English. The rebellion was a joint effort of white and black former indentured servants. The rebellion was led by Nathaniel Bacon against his relation, Governor Sir William Berkeley. The cause of the rebellion was Berkeley's refusal to come to the aid of colonists subjected to frequent raids and murder by the Indians. Bacon and other colonists, former indentured servants, were victims of raids by local Virginia tribes. Bacon's overseer was murdered by raiding Indians.

Cockacoeske (weroansqua of the Pamunkey), who succeeded her husband after he was killed fighting for the English, was an ally of Berkeley against Bacon. To the English, she was known as "Queen of the Pamunkey". She is known for having signed the Articles of Peace (Treaty of Middle Plantation) in 1677, after Bacon's Rebellion ended. As a result of the treaty, she gained authority over the Rappahannock and Chickahominy tribes, which had not formerly been members of the Confederacy. Completion of the treaty ushered in a time of peace between the Virginia tribes and the English Colonists. This treaty was signed by more tribal leaders than that of 1646. It reinforced the annual tribute payments and added many neighboring tribes to the Tributary Indians of the colonial government. More reservation lands were established for the tribes, but the treaty required Virginia’s tribal leaders to acknowledge they and their peoples were subjects of the King of England. While the rebellion did not completely succeed in the initial goal of driving the American Indians away from Virginia, it did result in Governor Sir William Berkeley being recalled to England, where he died shortly thereafter.

=== 20th–21st centuries ===
In 2009, about 430 tribal members remained, some of whom lived on their 1,200-acre (4.9 km^{2}) reservation. Others spread out across the United States.

The Pamunkey have been able to survive because of their ability to adapt as a tribe. Withstanding pressure to give up their reservation lands has helped them maintain traditional ways. Men use some of the old methods for fishing, part of the tribe's traditional heritage. They also continued to hunt and trap on reservation lands.

In 1998, the tribe built a shad hatchery to ensure continuation of an important food source. When shad are caught, the eggs of females are taken and placed into a bucket. Sperm from males are put into the same bucket. At holding tanks, the fertilized eggs are allowed to grow and hatch. Once the new fish are grown enough, usually after 21 days, they are flushed back into the river. Chief Miles estimated that seven million fry were put back into the river in 1998 and probably triple that number in 1999.

In 2026, some Pamunkey tribal members joined a multi-tribal coalition to protect Tree Hill, the birthplace of Chief Wahunsenacawh. They asked for consultation by a Canadian development firm who planned to build over 2000 housing units and commercial space.

==== Pottery ====
The Pamunkey tradition of pottery making dates back to before the English settled Jamestown. They have been using clay from the banks of the Pamunkey River since prehistoric times. Many continue to use the traditional method. To do so, they let the clay dry, then break it into smaller pieces. These pieces are soaked in water until reaching the consistency of cream. The clay is strained to remove rocks or debris. The water is drained and pressed out until the clay is like dough. It is then ready to be made into pots. Traditional pottery by Pamunkey ancestors of the Woodland Period was strengthened with crushed or burned shells, crushed steatite, river pebbles, or quartz sand.

In 1932, during the Great Depression, the Commonwealth of Virginia helped the Pamunkey develop their pottery as a source of income. The state set up a program for a pottery school and provided a teacher. The state furnished materials for the building, but the tribe built it themselves. Tribal members learned methods to increase the speed of manufacture. They incorporated firing pottery in a kiln and using glazes into their techniques. They learned to use squeeze molds to produce copies of pots quickly. Kiln firing produced finished pottery of more uniform brown tones than the shades of gray from traditional pottery techniques.

Pamunkey pottery-makers learned how to paint and glaze pots. The teacher taught them designs and pictographs based on well-known and popular Southwestern Indigenous traditions. Two pictographs represent important stories to the tribe: the story of Captain John Rolfe and Pocahontas and the story of the treaty that set up payments of game. After the teacher left the school, some members returned to traditional pottery techniques. Pamunkey used both traditional and newer techniques to create their pieces. To differentiate, pots made the traditional way are called 'blackware'. The Pamunkey Indian Museum has a variety of vessels, as well as videos and exhibits, that explain the differences in construction methods, types of temper, and decorating techniques.

The Pamunkey ensured their Pamunkey Indian Tribe Museum, built in 1979, resembled the traditional yehakin. Located on the reservation, the museum provides visitors with insight into the tribe's long history and culture. Included are artifacts from more than 10,000 years of indigenous settlement, replicas of prehistoric materials, and stories. The Smithsonian Institution recently selected the Pamunkey as one of 24 tribes to be featured in the National Museum of the American Indian in Washington, D.C.

==== Federal recognition ====
The Commonwealth of Virginia has always recognized the Pamunkey tribe, with formal relations dating back to the treaties of 1646 and 1677. However, since the United States did not exist at the time of those treaties, no formal relations existed between the Pamunkey and the federal government. In 1982, the Pamunkey began the process of applying for federal recognition. Their formal application met with opposition from MGM Casinos, which feared potential competition with its planned casino in Prince George's County, Maryland, and from members of the Congressional Black Caucus, who noted that the tribe had historically forbidden intermarriage between its members and Black people. The interracial marriage ban, which had long been unenforced and was formally rescinded in 2012, was a relic of the tribe's attempt to circumvent Virginia's Racial Integrity Act of 1924, which recognized only "White" and "Colored" people. The Bureau of Indian Affairs initially said that the Pamunkey had met its requirements for federal recognition in January 2014, but the final decision was repeatedly delayed until July 2, 2015, when the BIA granted them formal recognition. In February 2016 the Pamunkey received a court victory over a challenge to their right to exist as a political entity.

During the process of obtaining federal recognition, controversy around the tribe's racist legacy came to light, as the tribe disenfranchised and outlawed their members from intermarrying with Black families such as the Dungey's/Dungee families during their 1861 "Black laws". Therefore, using the 1900 and 1910 censuses as their only base rolls has been considered problematic by many because it excludes those Pamunkey Indians who were disenfranchised and forced to move from the Reservation before those censuses were taken. Despite the Black Laws supposedly being repealed in 2014, the tribe has yet to change their enrollment criteria.

Scholar Bartl Renate writes that the tribe had to remove tribal laws mandating the expulsion of those who married African-Americans before they could acquire federal recognition. These laws dated to 1887, such that "No Member of the Pamunkey Indian Tribe shall intermarry with anny [sic] Nation except White or Indian under penalty of forfeiting their rights in Town".
