= The True Story of Pocahontas: The Other Side of History =

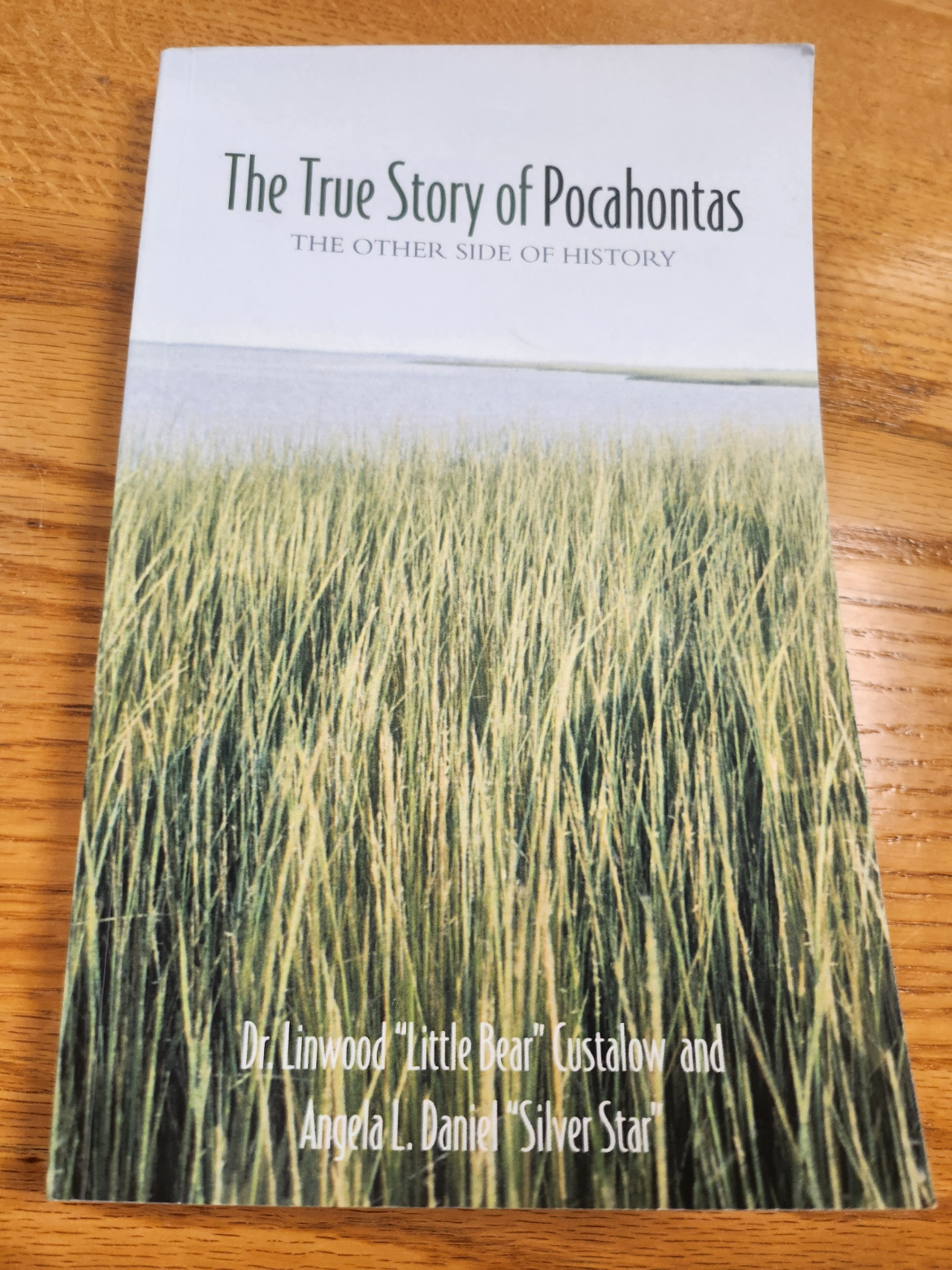
- Front cover
- Author: Dr. Linwood "Little Bear" Custalow, Angela L. Daniel "Silver Star"
- Language: English
- Genre: History
- Publisher: Fulcrum Publishing
- Publication date: January 2007
- Publication place: United States of America
- Pages: 168
- ISBN: 978-1-55591-632-9
- Website: https://www.fulcrumbooks.com/product-page/the-true-story-of-pocahontas

The True Story of Pocahontas: The Other Side of History is a book published in 2007 and was written by Dr. Linwood “Little Bear” Custalow and Angela L. Daniel “Silver Star”. The book itself delves into the history of Pocahontas as understood by the Powhatan people, the tribe in which Pocahontas belonged to.

== Research methods ==
The book's methodology is described by the authors as "Mattaponi sacred oral history". The Powhatan people did not have a written language so instead of writing, they would pass down their history and knowledge orally from generation to generation. To ensure that their knowledge and stories would be passed down accurately, a handful of people would be picked to know all of this information, memorize it, and share it responsibly with others. These people were known as quiakros (thought to be equivalent to Catholic priests) and were held in high regards as they are what many would call "human libraries."

During the time that the English came over to America, many of the quiakros went into hiding to avoid displacement and other malicious acts performed by the English. To then secure and protect the Powhatan people's history and stories many of the quiakros went to hide and continued to live with Mattaponi tribe.

Dr. Custalow, who was a descendent of Mattaponi chiefs, was also the oral historian of the Mattaponi tribe, and it is through this connection that he has the knowledge of what went on during Pocahontas' life, her abduction, and her death. At the time of publication, Angela L. Daniel was a doctoral student in anthropology at William and Mary.

== Contents ==
The book is split into two different parts. The first part primarily speaks of Pocahontas' childhood, her experiences and reasonings for interacting/not interacting with European colonizers when she did, and the relationship between the Powhatan people and the Europeans as well as what led to Pocahontas' capture in 1613.

The second half of the book discusses Pocahontas' time in captivity, her relationship with the English, and her death while then also revealing the aftermath of the English's arrival and how this has affected and continued to affect the Powhatan peoples and other Indigenous tribes as well.

Included in the book is also a list of chronological events starting from 1580 up until 1618. This list marks events such as the births of John smith and John Rolfe, the first and last meeting between John Smith and Chief Powhatan Wahunsenaca, as well as the marriage between Pocahontas and John Rolfe.

== Reception ==
Reviews of the book have been overall positive. Writing for Native Peoples Magazine, Debra Utacia Krol argues that "recollection of Pocahontas' real-life experiences should be required reading for all students of American history. Recognizing how the book departs from both American myth surrounding the figure of Pocahontas, as well as other historical interpretations, Lisa Heuvel recognizes that a "postmodern message resonates from The True Story of Pocahontas: There are many sides to history, and some contest much of the colonial Virginia saga schoolchildren have grown up with. This narrative exemplifies how specific alternative histories reside in different cultures and can produce much different portraits of historical figures." A more negative review, written by J. Frederick Fausz for the Virginia Magazine of History and Biography questions the credibility of the account. "This book," asserts Fausz, "had the potential to resolve conundrums in the history of early (or late) Virginia, but obviously the Mattaponis cannot supply the most crucial new details about Don Luis, the identity of Pocahontas's rapist, or even the name of her first son."

== See also ==
- Pocahontas
- Powhatan
- Mattaponi
- Oral history
- Tsenacommacah
- Colony of Virginia
- Oral tradition
