= Pocahontas =

Native American woman (c. 1596 – 1617)

- Pocahontas depicted in a 1616 portrait engraving by Simon de Passe
- Born: Amonute c. 1596; Werowocomoco, Tsenacommacah (near present-day Gloucester Courthouse, Virginia, U.S.)
- Died: March 1617 (aged 20–21); Gravesend, Kent, Kingdom of England
- Resting place: St George's Church, Gravesend, Gravesham, England
- Other names: Matoaka, Rebecca Rolfe
- Known for: Association with Jamestown colony, inclusion in writings by John Smith, and as a Powhatan convert to Christianity
- Spouse: John Rolfe (m. 1614)
- Children: Thomas Rolfe
- Parent: Wahunsenacawh (father)

Pocahontas (US: /ˌpoʊkəˈhɒntəs/, UK: /ˌpɒk-/; born Amonute, also known as Matoaka and Rebecca Rolfe; c. 1596 – March 1617) was a Native American woman belonging to the Powhatan people, notable for her association with the colonial settlement at Jamestown, Virginia. She was the daughter of Wahunsenacawh, the Mamanatowick (leader) of a network of tributary tribes in the Powhatan Confederacy, encompassing the Tidewater region of what is today the U.S. state of Virginia.

Pocahontas was captured and held for ransom by English colonists during hostilities in 1613. During her captivity, she was encouraged to convert to Christianity and was baptized under the name Rebecca. She married the tobacco planter John Rolfe in April 1614 at the age of about 17 or 18, and she bore their son, Thomas Rolfe, in January 1615.

In 1616, the Rolfes travelled to London, where Pocahontas was presented to English society as an example of the "civilized savage" in hopes of stimulating investment in Jamestown. On this trip, she may have met Squanto, a Patuxet man from New England. Pocahontas became a celebrity, was elegantly fêted, and attended a masque at Whitehall Palace. In 1617, the Rolfes intended to sail for Virginia, but Pocahontas died at Gravesend, Kent, England, of unknown causes, aged 20 or 21. She was buried in St George's Church, Gravesend; her grave's exact location is unknown because the church was rebuilt after being destroyed by a fire.

Numerous places, landmarks, and products in the United States have been named after Pocahontas. Her story has been romanticized over the years, many aspects of which are fictional. Many of the stories told about her by the English explorer John Smith have been contested by her documented descendants. She is a subject of art, literature, and film. Many famous people have claimed to be among her descendants, including members of the First Families of Virginia, First Lady Edith Wilson, American actor Glenn Strange, and astronomer Percival Lowell.

== Early life ==
Pocahontas's birth year is unknown, but some historians estimate it to have been around 1596. In A True Relation of Virginia (1608), the English explorer John Smith described meeting Pocahontas in the spring of 1608 when she was "a child of ten years old". In a 1616 letter, Smith again described her as she was in 1608, but this time as "a child of twelve or thirteen years of age".

Pocahontas was the daughter of Powhatan, Mamanatowick of the Powhatan Confederacy, an alliance of about thirty polities in the Tidewater region of the present-day U.S. state of Virginia. Her mother's name and origin are unknown, but she was probably of lowly status. English adventurer Henry Spelman had lived among the Powhatan people as an interpreter, and he noted that, when one of the Mamanatowick's many wives gave birth, she was returned to her place of origin and supported there by the Mamanatowick until she found another husband. However, little is known about Pocahontas's mother, and it has been theorized that she died in childbirth. The Mattaponi Reservation people are descendants of the Powhatans, and their oral tradition claims that Pocahontas's mother was the first wife of Powhatan and that Pocahontas was named after her.

=== Names ===
Pocahontas is known to have had two other names, Matoaka (Matoax) and Amonute. It appears that at birth, Powhatan children were given a "formal" name announced to the community and a "secret" name known only to one's parents. This was the case in neighboring Native American cultures. However, the best evidence we have for the existence of a secret name among the Powhatan is Pocahontas herself. Historian William Stith claimed that "her real name, it seems, was originally Matoax, which the Native Americans carefully concealed from the English and changed it to Pocahontas, out of a superstitious fear, lest they, by the knowledge of her true name, should be enabled to do her some hurt." According to anthropologist Helen C. Rountree, Pocahontas revealed her secret name Matoaka to the colonists "only after she had taken another religious – baptismal – name" of Rebecca.

While the formal name was retained throughout life, Powhatan people would give children more familiar nicknames as their behaviors began to demonstrate a character. According to colonist William Strachey, "Pocahontas" was a childhood nickname meaning "little wanton". In his account, Strachey describes Pocahontas as a child visiting the fort at Jamestown and playing with the young boys; she would "get the boys forth with her into the marketplace and make them wheel, falling on their hands, turning up their heels upwards, whom she would follow and wheel so herself, naked as she was, all the fort over".

=== Title and status ===
Pocahontas is frequently viewed as a princess in popular culture. In 1841, William Watson Waldron of Trinity College, Dublin, published Pocahontas, American Princess: and Other Poems, calling her "the beloved and only surviving daughter of the king". She was her father's "delight and darling", according to colonist Captain Ralph Hamor, but she was not in line to inherit a position as a weroance, local leader, or mamanatowick (paramount leader). Instead, Powhatan's brothers and sisters and his sisters' children all stood in line to succeed him. In his A Map of Virginia, John Smith explained how matrilineal inheritance worked among the Powhatans:

His kingdom descendeth not to his sonnes nor children: but first to his brethren, whereof he hath three namely Opitchapan, Opechanncanough, and Catataugh; and after their decease to his sisters. First to the eldest sister, then to the rest: and after them to the heires male and female of the eldest sister; but never to the heires of the males.

== Interactions with the colonists ==
=== John Smith ===
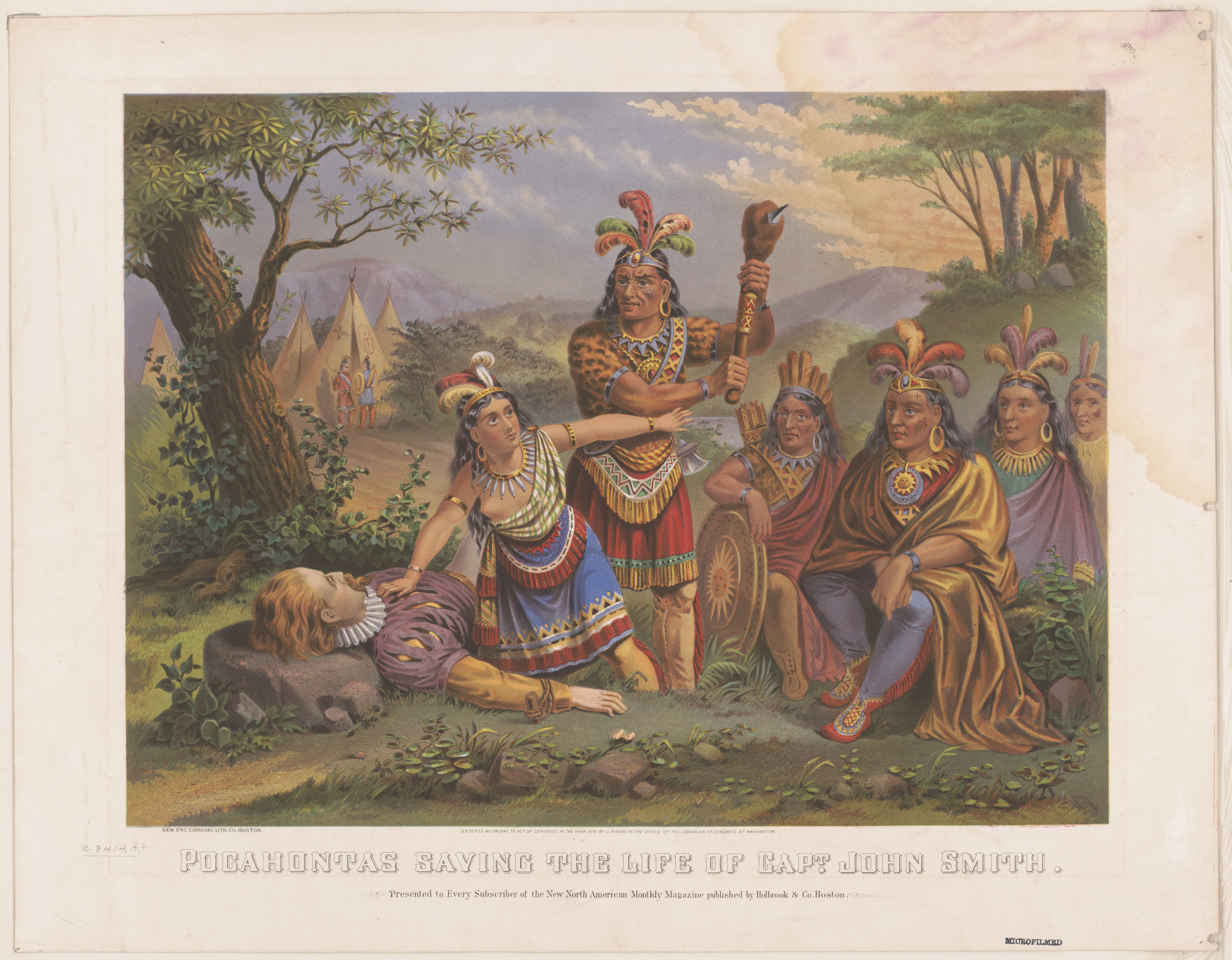
Pocahontas saves the life of John Smith in this chromolithograph, credited to the New England Chromo. Lith. Company around 1870. The scene is idealized; there are no mountains in Tidewater, Virginia, for example, and the Powhatans lived in thatched houses rather than tipis.

Pocahontas is most famously linked to colonist John Smith, who arrived in Virginia with 100 other settlers in April 1607. The colonists built a fort on a marshy peninsula on the James River, and had numerous encounters over the next several months with the people of Tsenacommacah – some of them friendly, some hostile.

A hunting party led by Powhatan's close relative Opechancanough captured Smith in December 1607 while he was exploring on the Chickahominy River and brought him to Powhatan's capital at Werowocomoco. In his 1608 account, Smith describes a great feast followed by a long talk with Powhatan. He does not mention Pocahontas in relation to his capture, and claims that they first met some months later. Margaret Huber suggests that Powhatan was attempting to bring Smith and the other colonists under his own authority. He offered Smith rule of the town of Capahosic, which was close to his capital at Werowocomoco, as he hoped to keep Smith and his men "nearby and better under control".

In 1616, Smith wrote a letter to Queen Anne of Denmark, the wife of King James, in anticipation of Pocahontas' visit to England. In this new account, his capture included the threat of his own death: "at the minute of my execution, she hazarded the beating out of her own brains to save mine; and not only that but so prevailed with her father, that I was safely conducted to Jamestown." He expanded on this in his 1624 Generall Historie, published seven years after the death of Pocahontas. He explained that he was captured and taken to the Mamanatowick where "two great stones were brought before Powhatan: then as many as could layd hands on him [Smith], dragged him to them, and thereon laid his head, and being ready with their clubs, to beate out his braines, Pocahontas the Kings dearest daughter, when no intreaty could prevaile, got his head in her armes, and laid her owne upon his to save him from death."

Karen Ordahl Kupperman suggests that Smith used such details to embroider his first account, thus producing a more dramatic second account of his encounter with Pocahontas as a heroine worthy of Queen Anne's audience. She argues that its later revision and publication was Smith's attempt to raise his own stock and reputation, as he had fallen from favor with the London Company which had funded the Jamestown enterprise. Anthropologist Frederic W. Gleach suggests that Smith's second account was substantially accurate but represents his misunderstanding of a three-stage ritual intended to adopt him into the confederacy, but not all writers are convinced, some suggesting the absence of certain corroborating evidence.

Early histories did establish that Pocahontas befriended Smith and the colonists. She often went to the settlement and played games with the boys there. When the colonists were starving, "every once in four or five days, Pocahontas with her attendants brought [Smith] so much provision that saved many of their lives that else for all this had starved with hunger." As the colonists expanded their settlement, the Powhatans felt that their lands were threatened, and conflicts arose again. In late 1609, an injury from a gunpowder explosion forced Smith to return to England for medical care and the colonists told the Powhatans that he was dead. Pocahontas believed that account and stopped visiting Jamestown but learned that Smith was living in England when she traveled there with her husband John Rolfe.

=== Capture ===
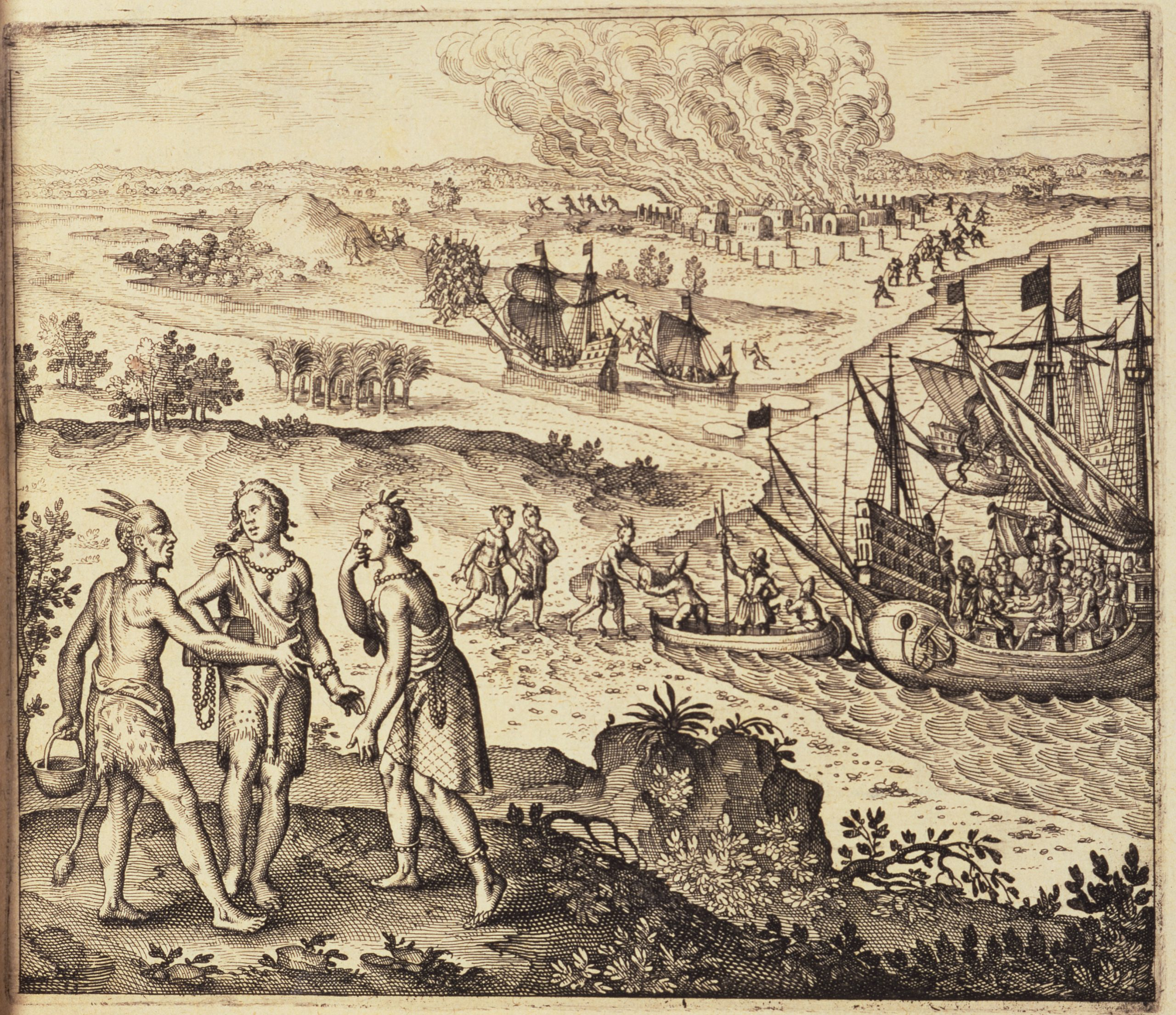
The abduction of Pocahontas (1624) by Johann Theodor de Bry, depicting a full narrative. Starting in the lower left, Pocahontas (center) is deceived by weroance Iopassus, who holds a copper kettle as bait, and his wife, who pretends to cry. At center right, Pocahontas is put on the boat and feasted. In the background, the action moves from the Potomac to the York River, where negotiations fail to trade a hostage and the colonists attack and burn a Native village.

Pocahontas' capture occurred in the context of the First Anglo-Powhatan War, a conflict between the Jamestown settlers and the Natives which began late in the summer of 1609.

In the first years of war, the colonists took control of the James River, both at its mouth and at the falls. In the meantime, Captain Samuel Argall pursued contacts with Native tribes in the northern portion of Powhatan Confederacy. The Patawomecks lived on the Potomac River and were not always loyal to Powhatan, and living with them was Henry Spelman, a young English interpreter. In March 1613, Argall learned that Pocahontas was visiting the Patawomeck village of Passapatanzy and living under the protection of the weroance Iopassus (also known as Japazaws).

With Spelman's help interpreting, Argall pressured Iopassus to assist in Pocahontas' capture by promising an alliance with the colonists against the Powhatans. According to Mattaponi oral tradition, Iopassus was also pressured by his councilors, who called an emergency meeting demanding that Iopassus hand over Pocahontas to the English. Iopassus, with the help of his wives, tricked Pocahontas into boarding Argall's ship, Treasurer, and held her for ransom, demanding the release of colonial prisoners held by her father and the return of various stolen weapons and tools.

During the year-long wait, Pocahontas was held at the English settlement of Henricus in present-day Chesterfield County, Virginia. Little is known about her life there, although colonist Ralph Hamor wrote that she received "extraordinary courteous usage" (meaning she was treated well). According to Mattaponi oral tradition, Powhatan refused to retaliate in fear of his daughter's life despite the Powhatan priests pressuring him to retaliate in revenge.

Linwood "Little Bear" Custalow refers to an oral tradition which claims that Pocahontas was raped; Helen Rountree counters that "other historians have disputed that such oral tradition survived and instead argue that any mistreatment of Pocahontas would have gone against the interests of the English in their negotiations with Powhatan. A truce had been called, the Indians still far outnumbered the English, and the colonists feared retaliation." At this time, Henricus minister Alexander Whitaker taught Pocahontas about Christianity and helped her improve her English. Upon her baptism, she took the Christian name "Rebecca".

In March 1614, the stand-off escalated to a violent confrontation between hundreds of colonists and Powhatan men on the Pamunkey River, and the colonists encountered a group of senior Native leaders at Powhatan's capital of Matchcot. The colonists allowed Pocahontas to talk to her tribe when Powhatan arrived, and she reportedly rebuked him for valuing her "less than old swords, pieces, or axes". She said that she preferred to live with the colonists "who loved her".

=== Possible first marriage ===
Mattaponi tradition holds that Pocahontas' first husband was Kocoum, brother of the Patawomeck weroance Japazaws, and that Kocoum was killed by the colonists after his wife's capture in 1613. Today's Patawomecks believe that Pocahontas and Kocoum had a daughter named Ka-Okee who was raised by the Patawomecks after her father's death and her mother's abduction.

Kocoum's identity, location, and very existence have been widely debated among scholars for centuries; the only mention of a "Kocoum" in any English document is a brief statement written about 1616 by William Strachey that Pocahontas had been living married to a "private captaine called Kocoum" for two years. Pocahontas married John Rolfe in 1614, and no other records even hint at any previous husband, so some have suggested that Strachey was mistakenly referring to Rolfe himself, with the reference being later misunderstood as one of Powhatan's officers.

=== Marriage to John Rolfe ===
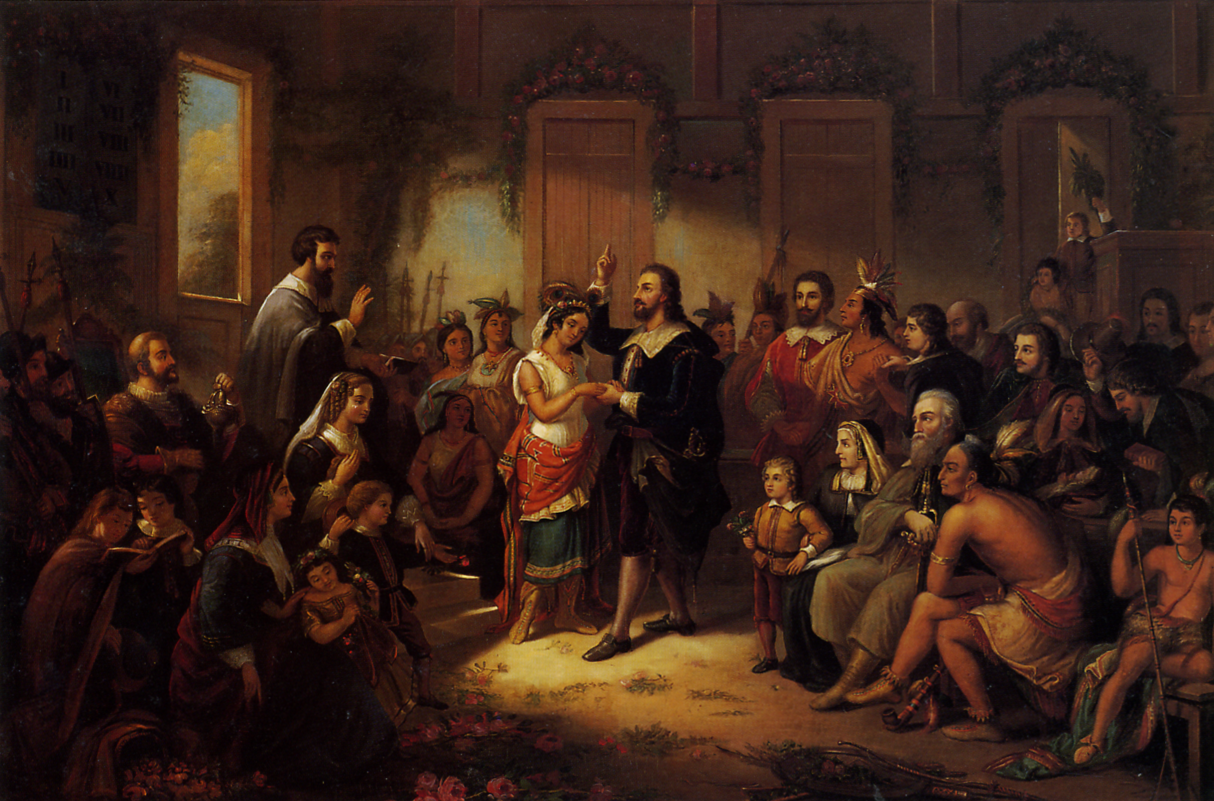
Marriage of Pocahontas (1855)

During her stay at Henricus, Pocahontas met John Rolfe. Rolfe's English-born wife Sarah Hacker and child Bermuda had died on the way to Virginia after the wreck of the ship Sea Venture on the Summer Isles, now known as Bermuda. He established the Virginia plantation Varina Farms, where he cultivated a new strain of tobacco. Rolfe was a pious man and agonized over the potential moral repercussions of marrying a heathen, though in fact Pocahontas had accepted the Christian faith and taken the baptismal name Rebecca. In a long letter to the governor requesting permission to wed her, he expressed his love for Pocahontas and his belief that he would be saving her soul. He wrote that he was:

motivated not by the unbridled desire of carnal affection, but for the good of this plantation, for the honor of our country, for the Glory of God, for my own salvation... namely Pocahontas, to whom my hearty and best thoughts are, and have been a long time so entangled, and enthralled in so intricate a labyrinth that I was even a-wearied to unwind myself thereout.

The couple were married on April 5, 1614, by chaplain Richard Buck, probably at Jamestown. For two years they lived at Varina Farms, across the James River from Henricus. Their son, Thomas, was born in January 1615.

The marriage created a climate of peace between the Jamestown colonists and Powhatan's tribes; it endured for eight years as the "Peace of Pocahontas". In 1615, Ralph Hamor wrote, "Since the wedding we have had friendly commerce and trade not only with Powhatan but also with his subjects round about us." The marriage was controversial in the English court at the time because "a commoner" had "the audacity" to marry a "princess".

=== England ===
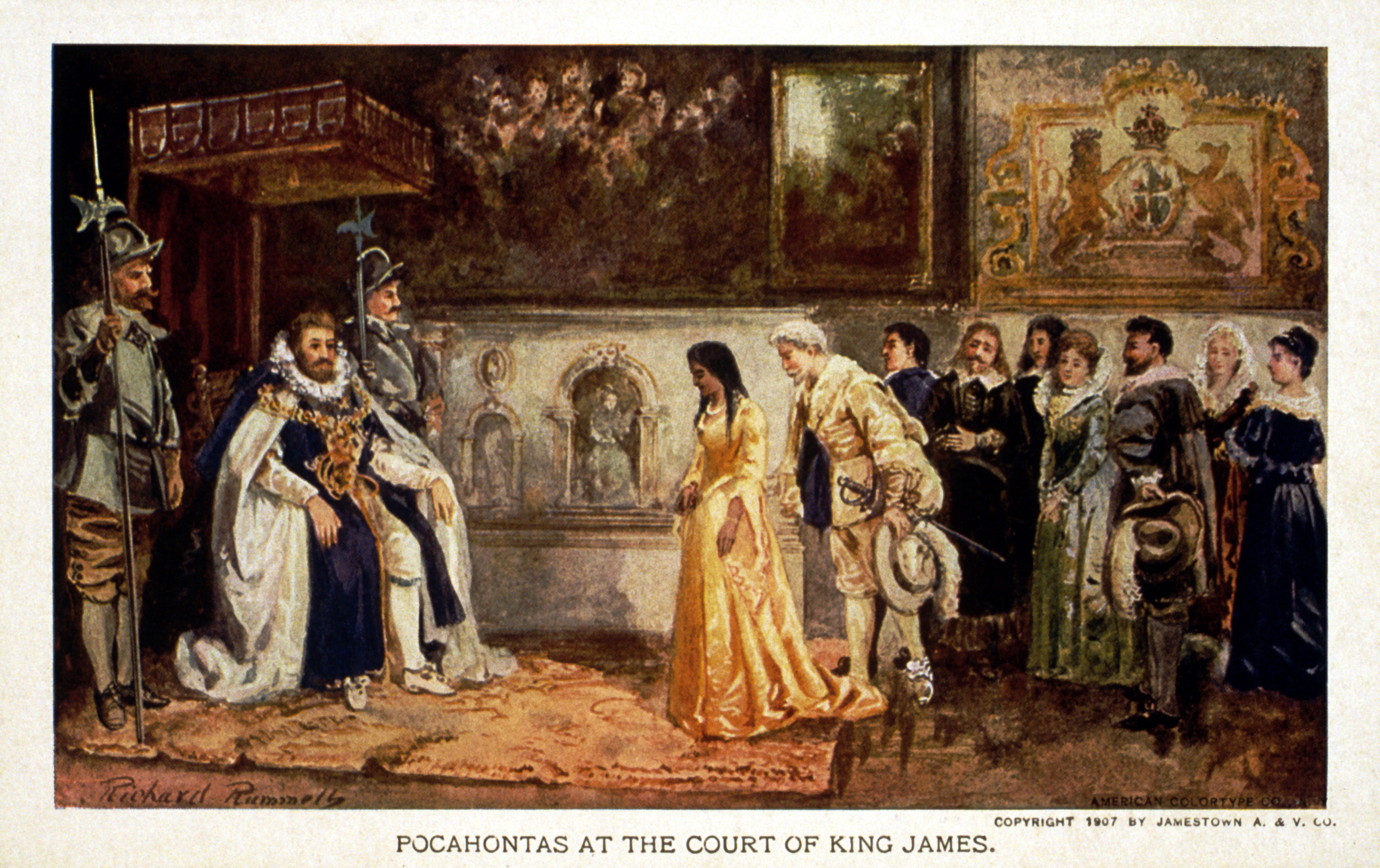
Pocahontas at the court of King James of England

One goal of the London Company was to convert Native Americans to Christianity, and they saw an opportunity to promote further investment with the conversion of Pocahontas and her marriage to Rolfe, all of which also helped end the First Anglo-Powhatan War. The company decided to bring Pocahontas to England as a symbol of the tamed New World "savage" and the success of the Virginia colony, and the Rolfes arrived at the port of Plymouth on June 12, 1616. The family journeyed to London by coach, accompanied by eleven other Powhatans including a holy man named Tomocomo.

John Smith was living in London at the time while Pocahontas was in Plymouth, and she learned that he was still alive. Smith did not meet Pocahontas, but he wrote to Queen Anne urging that Pocahontas be treated with respect as a royal visitor. He suggested that, if she were treated badly, her "present love to us and Christianity might turn to... scorn and fury", and England might lose the chance to "rightly have a Kingdom by her means".

Pocahontas was entertained at various social gatherings. On January 5, 1617, she and Tomocomo were brought before King James at the old Banqueting House in the Palace of Whitehall at a performance of Ben Jonson's masque The Vision of Delight. According to Smith, the king was so unprepossessing that neither Pocahontas nor Tomocomo realized whom they had met until it was explained to them afterward.

Pocahontas was not a princess in Powhatan culture, but the London Company presented her as one to the English public because she was the daughter of an important chief. The inscription on a 1616 engraving of Pocahontas reads "MATOAKA ALS REBECCA FILIA POTENTISS : PRINC : POWHATANI IMP:VIRGINIÆ", meaning "Matoaka, alias Rebecca, daughter of the most powerful prince of the Powhatan Empire of Virginia". Many English at this time recognized Powhatan as the ruler of an empire, and presumably accorded to his daughter what they considered appropriate status. Smith's letter to Queen Anne refers to "Powhatan their chief King". Cleric and travel writer Samuel Purchas recalled meeting Pocahontas in London, noting that she impressed those whom she met because she "carried her selfe as the daughter of a king". When he met her again in London, Smith referred to her deferentially as a "King's daughter".

Pocahontas was apparently treated well in London. At the masque, her seats were described as "well placed" and, according to Purchas, London's Bishop John King "entertained her with festival state and pomp beyond what I have seen in his greate hospitalitie afforded to other ladies".

Not all the English were so impressed, however. Helen C. Rountree claims that there is no contemporaneous evidence to suggest that Pocahontas was regarded in England "as anything like royalty," despite the writings of John Smith. Rather, she was considered to be something of a curiosity, according to Rountree, who suggests that she was merely "the Virginian woman" to most Englishmen.

Pocahontas and Rolfe lived in the town of Brentford, Middlesex, for some time, as well as at Rolfe's family home at Heacham, Norfolk. In early 1617, Smith met the couple at a social gathering and wrote that, when Pocahontas saw him, "without any words, she turned about, obscured her face, as not seeming well contented," and was left alone for two or three hours. Later, they spoke more; Smith's record of what she said to him is fragmentary and enigmatic. She reminded him of the "courtesies she had done," saying, "you did promise Powhatan what was yours would be his, and he the like to you." She then discomfited him by calling him "father", explaining that Smith had called Powhatan "father" when he was a stranger in Virginia, "and by the same reason so must I do you". Smith did not accept this form of address because, he wrote, Pocahontas outranked him as "a King's daughter". Pocahontas then said, "with a well-set countenance":

Were you not afraid to come into my father's country and caused fear in him and all his people (but me) and fear you here I should call you "father"? I tell you then I will, and you shall call me child, and so I will be for ever and ever your countryman.

Finally, Pocahontas told Smith that she and her tribe had thought him dead, but her father had told Tomocomo to seek him "because your countrymen will lie much".

== Death ==
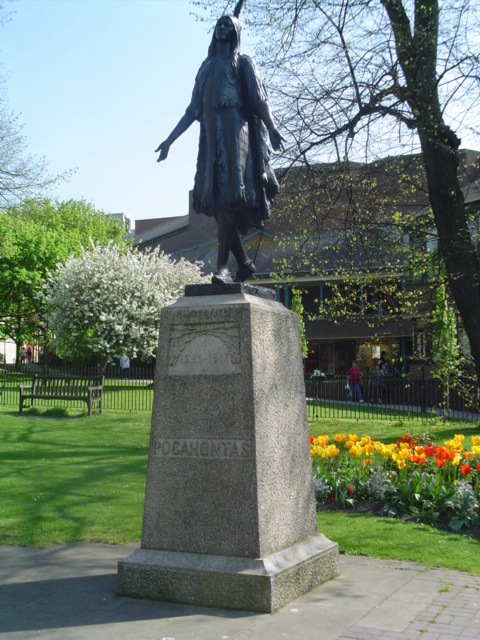
Statue of Pocahontas outside St George's Church, Gravesend, Kent, where she was buried in a grave now lost

In March 1617, Rolfe and Pocahontas boarded a ship to return to Virginia, but they had sailed only as far as Gravesend on the River Thames when Pocahontas became gravely ill. She was taken ashore, where she died from unknown causes, aged approximately 21 and "much lamented". According to Rolfe, she declared that "all must die"; for her, it was enough that her child lived. Speculated causes of her death include pneumonia, smallpox, tuberculosis, hemorrhagic dysentery (the "bloody flux") and poisoning.

Pocahontas's funeral took place on March 21, 1617, in the parish of St George's Church, Gravesend. Her grave is thought to be underneath the church's chancel, though that church was destroyed in a fire in 1727 and its exact site is unknown. Since 1958, she has been commemorated by a life-sized bronze statue in St. George's churchyard, a replica of the 1907 Jamestown sculpture by the American sculptor William Ordway Partridge.

== Legacy ==
Pocahontas and John Rolfe had a son, Thomas Rolfe, born in January 1615. Thomas and his wife, Jane Poythress, had a daughter, Jane Rolfe, who was born in Varina, in present-day Henrico County, Virginia, on October 10, 1650. Jane married Robert Bolling of present-day Prince George County, Virginia. Their son, John Bolling, was born in 1676. John Bolling married Mary Kennon and had six surviving children, each of whom married and had surviving children.

In 1907, Pocahontas was the first Native American to be honored on a U.S. stamp. She was a member of the inaugural class of Virginia Women in History in 2000. In July 2015, the Pamunkey Native tribe became the first federally recognized tribe in the state of Virginia; they are descendants of the Powhatan Confederacy, of which Pocahontas was a member. Pocahontas is the twelfth great-grandmother of the American actor Edward Norton.

=== Image gallery ===
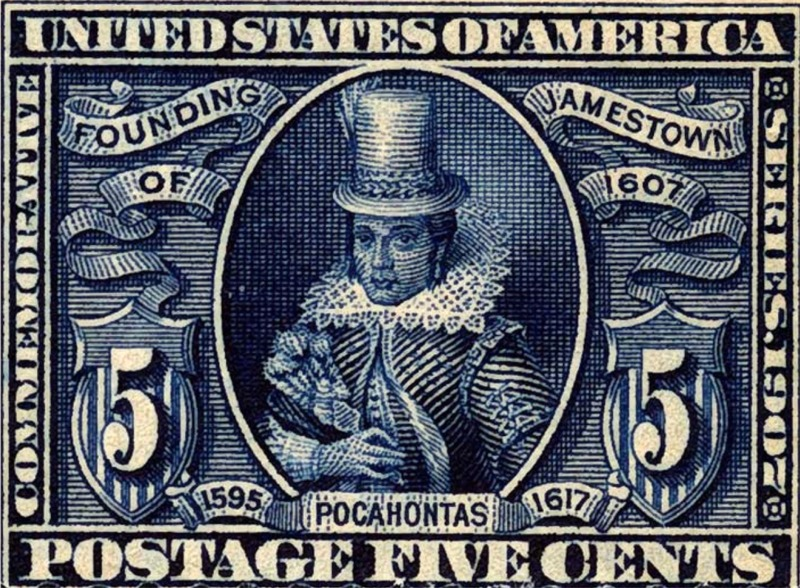
Pocahontas commemorative postage stamp of 1907

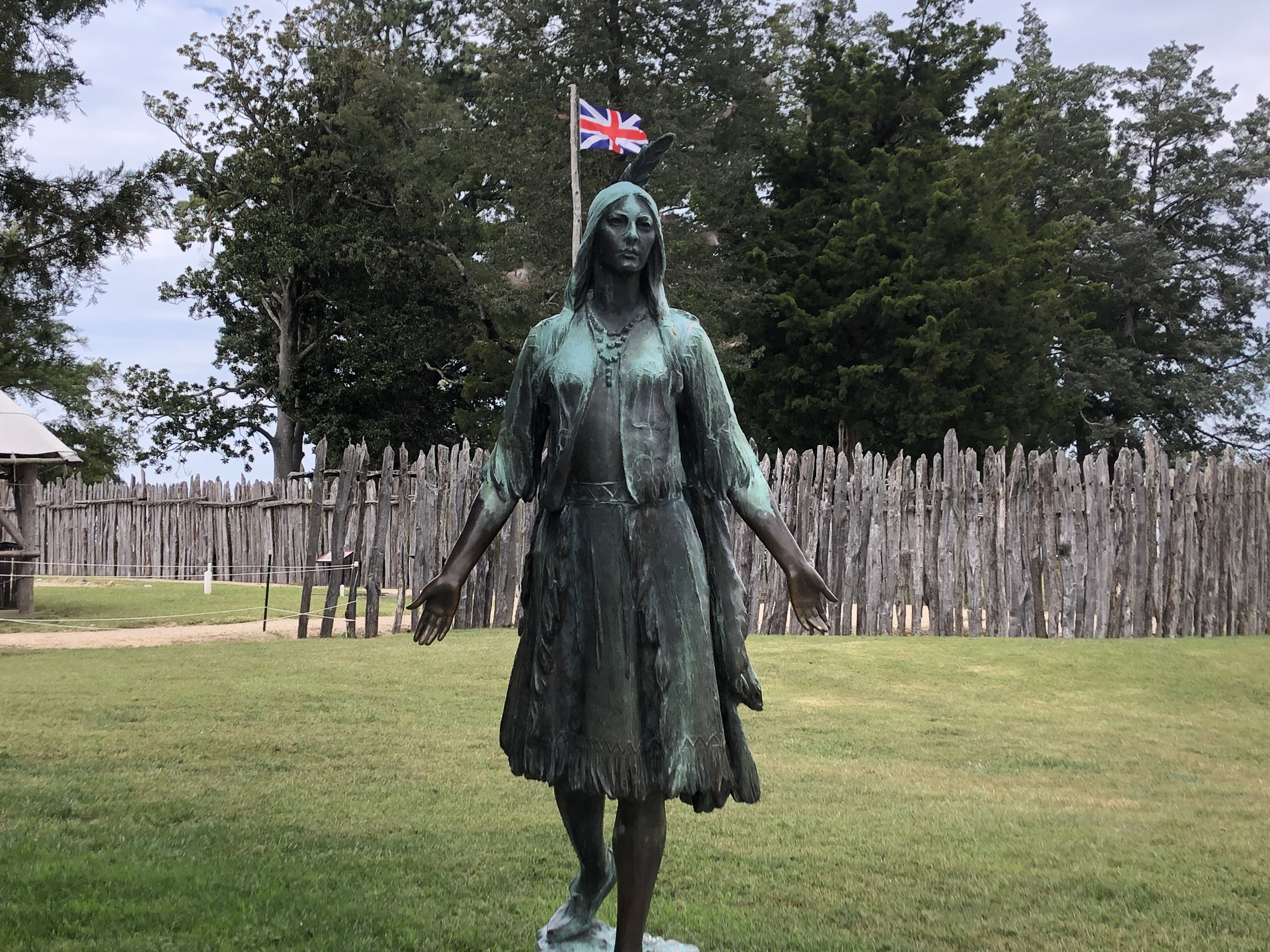
Statue in Jamestown, Virginia

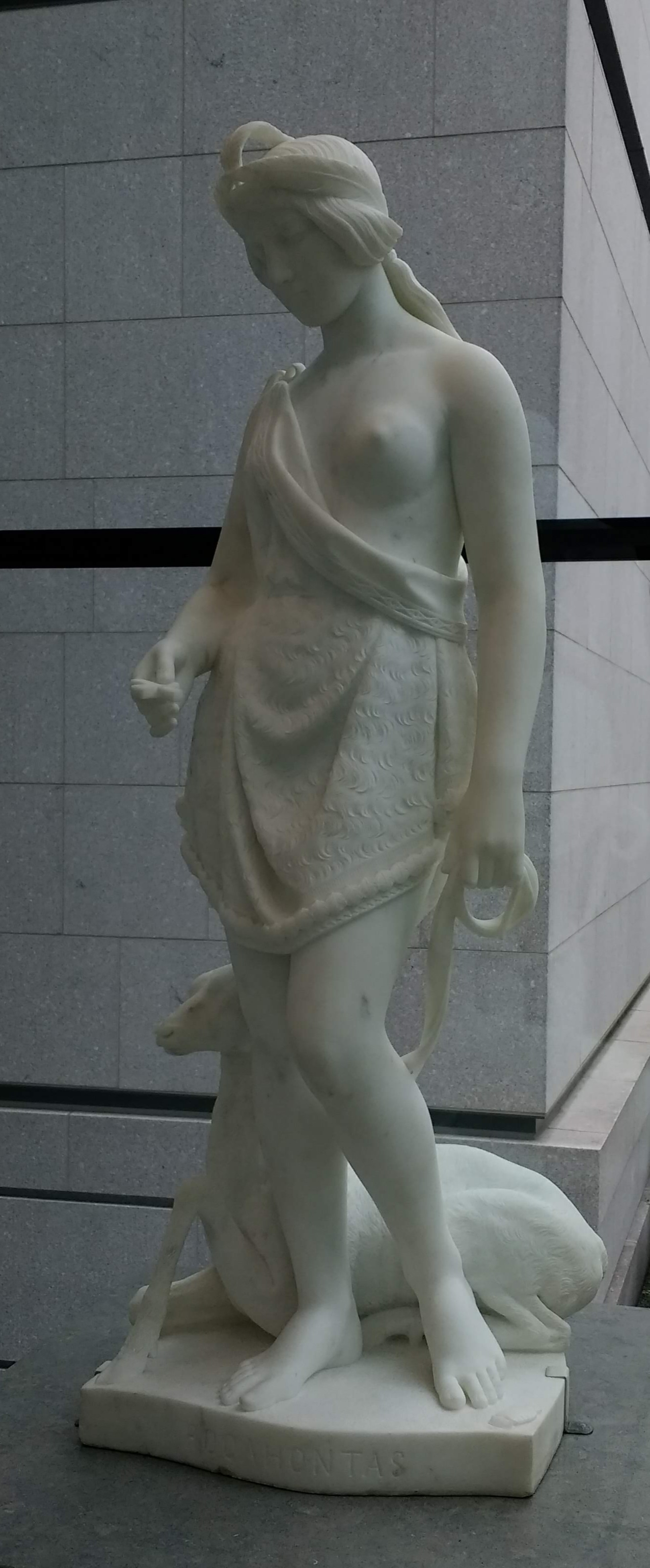
Statue by Joseph Mozier

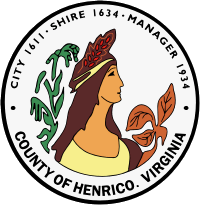
Likeness of Pocahontas on the seal of Henrico County, Virginia

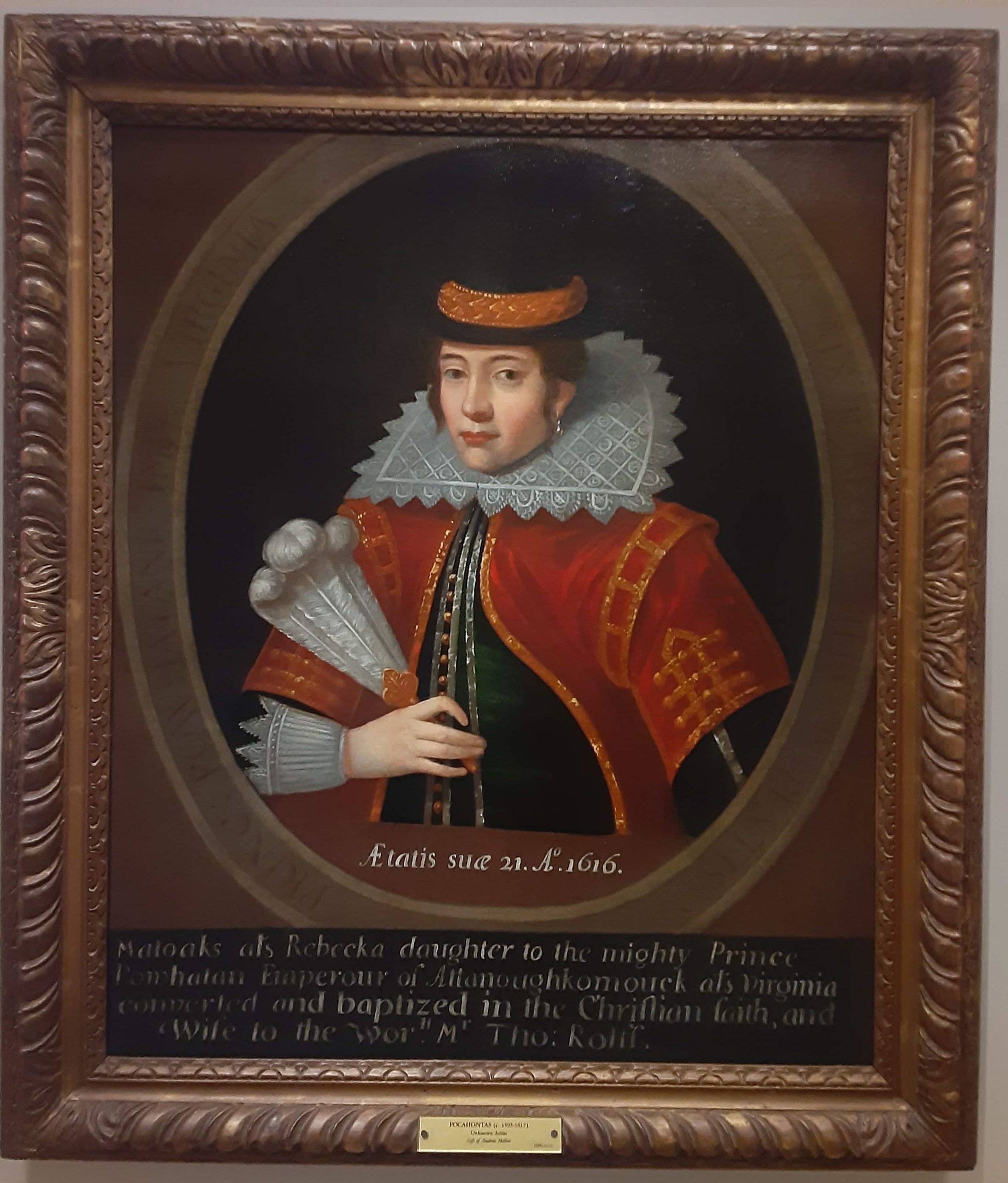
A painting of Pocahontas in the National Portrait Gallery in Washington, DC

== Cultural representations ==
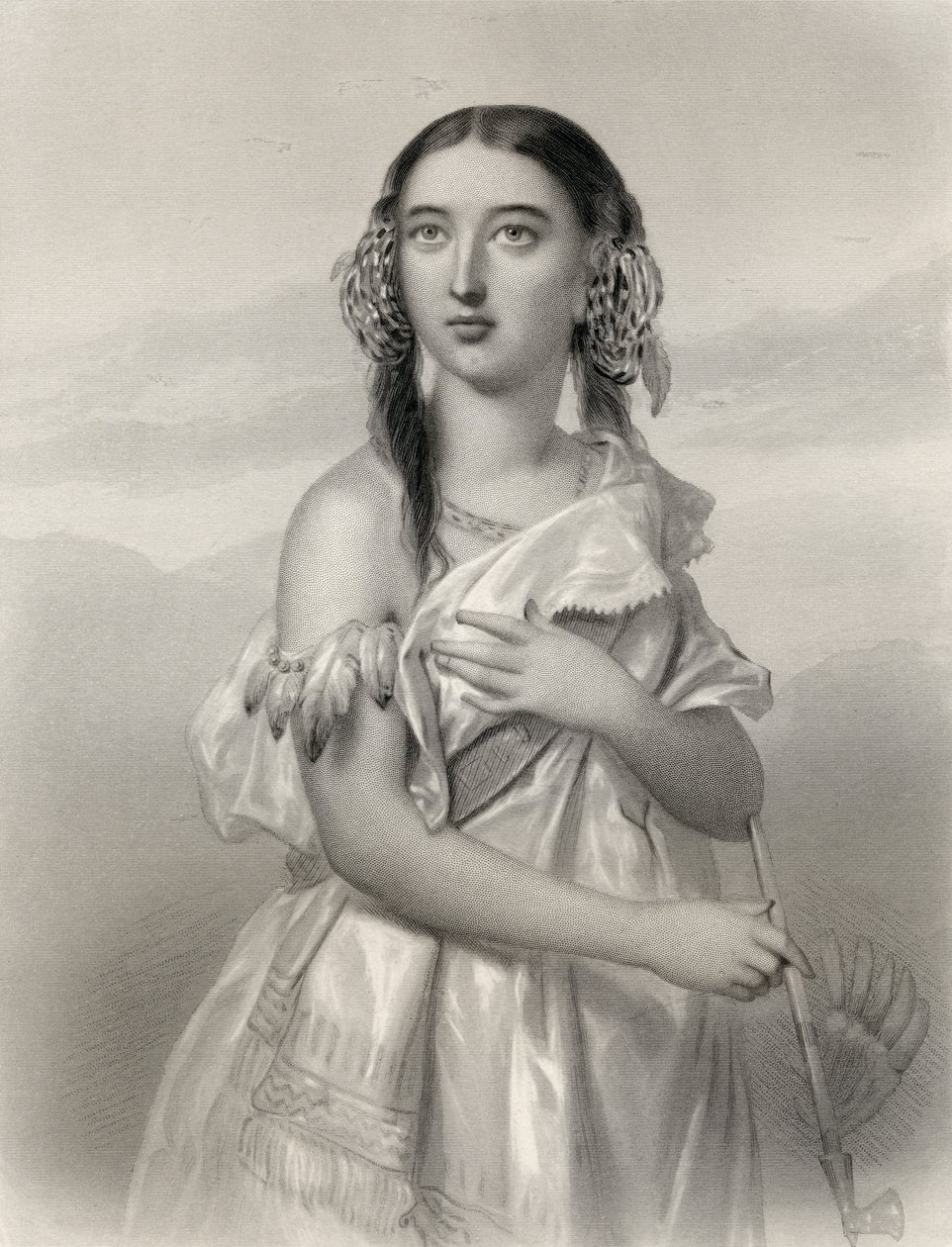
A 19th-century depiction

After her death, increasingly fanciful and romanticized representations were produced about Pocahontas, in which she and Smith are frequently portrayed as romantically involved. Contemporaneous sources substantiate claims of their friendship but not romance. The first claim of their romantic involvement was in John Davis' Travels in the United States of America (1803).

Rayna Green has discussed the similar fetishization that Native and Asian women experience. Both groups are viewed as "exotic" and "submissive", which aids their dehumanization. Also, Green touches on how Native women had to either "keep their exotic distance or die," which is associated with the widespread image of Pocahontas trying to sacrifice her life for John Smith.

Cornel Pewewardy writes, "In Pocahontas, Indian characters such as Grandmother Willow, Meeko, and Flit belong to the Disney tradition of familiar animals. In so doing, they are rendered as cartoons, certainly less realistic than Pocahontas and John Smith; In this way, Indians remain marginal and invisible, thereby ironically being 'strangers in their own lands' – the shadow Indians. They fight desperately on the silver screen in defense of their asserted rights, but die trying to kill the white hero or save the Indian woman."

=== Stage ===
- Pocahontas: Schauspiel mit Gesang, in fünf Akten (A Play with Songs, in five Acts) by Johann Wilhelm Rose (1784)
- Captain Smith and the Princess Pocahontas (1806)
- James Nelson Barker's The Indian Princess; or, La Belle Sauvage (1808)
- George Washington Parke Custis, Pocahontas; or The Settlers of Virginia (1830)
- John Brougham's production of the burlesque Po-ca-hon-tas, or The Gentle Savage (1855)
- Brougham's burlesque revised for London as La Belle Sauvage, opening at St James's Theatre, November 27, 1869
- Sydney Grundy's Pocahontas, a comic opera, music by Edward Solomon, which opened at the Empire Theatre in London on December 26, 1884, and ran for just 24 performances with Lillian Russell in the title role and C. Hayden Coffin in his stage debut in the piece, taking the role of Captain Smith for the final six nights
- Miss Pocahontas (Broadway musical), Lyric Theatre, New York City, October 28, 1907
- Pocahontas ballet by Elliot Carter Jr., Martin Beck Theatre, New York City, May 24, 1939
- Pocahontas musical by Kermit Goell, Lyric Theatre, West End, London, November 14, 1963

=== Stamps ===
- The Jamestown Exposition was held in Norfolk, Virginia from April 26 to December 1, 1907, to celebrate the 300th anniversary of the Jamestown settlement, and three commemorative postage stamps were issued in conjunction with it. The five-cent stamp portrays Pocahontas, modeled from Simon van de Passe's 1616 engraving. About 8 million were issued.

=== Film ===
Pocahontas had renewed popularity within the media after the release of the 1995 Disney animated children's film Pocahontas., in which, she is depicted as a "noble, romantic savage–an innocent, one with nature, and inherently good" person, despite her being a Native woman only perpetuates the "single image mainstream society has of Natives as gentle, traditional, and stuck in the past."

Films about Pocahontas include:

- Pocahontas (1910), a Thanhouser Company silent short drama
- Pocahontas and John Smith (1924), a silent film directed by Bryan Foy
- Captain John Smith and Pocahontas (1953), directed by Lew Landers and starring Jody Lawrance as Pocahontas
- Pocahontas (1994), a Japanese animated production from Jetlag Productions directed by Toshiyuki Hiruma Takashi
- Pocahontas: The Legend (1995), a Canadian film based on her life
- Pocahontas (1995), a Walt Disney Company animated feature, one of the Disney Princess films, and the most well known adaptation of the Pocahontas story. The film presents a fictional romantic affair between Pocahontas and John Smith, in which Pocahontas teaches Smith respect for nature. Irene Bedard voiced and provided the physical model for the title character.
  - Pocahontas II: Journey to a New World (1998), a direct-to-video Disney sequel depicting Pocahontas falling in love with John Rolfe and traveling to England
- The New World (2005), film directed by Terrence Malick and starring Q'orianka Kilcher as Pocahontas
- Pocahontas: Dove of Peace (2016), a docudrama produced by Christian Broadcasting Network

=== Literature ===
- Davis, John (1803). Travels in the United States of America.
- The first settlers of Virginia: an historical novel New York: Printed for I. Riley and Co. 1806
- Lydia Sigourney's long poem Pocahontas relates her history and is the title work of her 1841 collection of poetry.

=== Art ===
- Simon van de Passe's engraving of 1616
- The abduction of Pocahontas (1619), a narrative engraving by Johann Theodor de Bry
- William Ordway Partridge's bronze statue (1922) of Pocahontas in Jamestown, Virginia; a replica (1958) stands in the grounds of St George's Church, Gravesend
- Baptism of Pocahontas (1840), a painting by John Gadsby Chapman which hangs in the rotunda of the United States Capitol Building

=== Others ===
- Lake Matoaka, an 18th-century mill pond on the campus of the College of William & Mary renamed for Pocahontas's Powhatan name in the 1920s
- The USS Princess Matoika, a Barbarossa-class ocean liner seized by the U.S. and used as a transport during the First World War
- The SS Pocahontas, name of three vessels including one that Virginia Ferry Corporation completed in 1940 for Little Creek–Cape Charles Ferry, sold to Cape May–Lewes Ferry in 1963, and renamed as the SS Delaware, operating from 1964 to 1974
- The USS Pocahontas (ID-3044)
- The Pocahontas – a passenger train of the Norfolk and Western Railway, running from Norfolk, Virginia to Cincinnati, Ohio
- The minor planet 4487 Pocahontas

== See also ==
- La Malinche – a Nahua woman from the Mexican Gulf Coast, who played a major role in the Spanish-Aztec War as an interpreter for the Spanish conquistador Hernán Cortés
- List of kidnappings before 1900
- Mary Kittamaquund – daughter of a Piscataway Weroance in colonial Maryland
- Sedgeford Hall Portrait – once thought to represent Pocahontas and Thomas Rolfe but now believed to depict the wife (Pe-o-ka) and son of Seminole Chief Osceola
- The True Story of Pocahontas: The Other Side of History

== Bibliography ==
- Argall, Samuel. Letter to Nicholas Hawes. June 1613. Repr. in Jamestown Narratives, ed. Edward Wright Haile. Champlain, VA: Roundhouse, 1998.
- Bulla, Clyde Robert. "Little Nantaquas." In Pocahontas and The Strangers, ed Scholastic Inc., New York. 1971.
- Custalow, Linwood "Little Bear" and Daniel, Angela L. "Silver Star." The True Story of Pocahontas, Fulcrum Publishing, Golden, Colorado 2007, ISBN 978-1-55591-632-9.
- Dale, Thomas. Letter to 'D.M.' 1614. Repr. in Jamestown Narratives, ed. Edward Wright Haile. Champlain, VA: Roundhouse, 1998.
- Dale, Thomas. Letter to Sir Ralph Winwood. June 3, 1616. Repr. in Jamestown Narratives, ed. Edward Wright Haile. Champlain, VA: Roundhouse, 1998.
- Fausz, J. Frederick. "An 'Abundance of Blood Shed on Both Sides': England's First Indian War, 1609–1614". The Virginia Magazine of History and Biography 98:1 (January 1990), pp. 3–56.
- Gleach, Frederic W. Powhatan's World and Colonial Virginia. Lincoln: University of Nebraska Press, 1997.
- Hamor, Ralph. A True Discourse of the Present Estate of Virginia. 1615. Repr. in Jamestown Narratives, ed. Edward Wright Haile. Champlain, VA: Roundhouse, 1998.
- Herford, C.H. and Percy Simpson, eds. Ben Jonson (Oxford: Clarendon Press, 1925–1952).
- Huber, Margaret Williamson (January 12, 2011). "Powhatan (d. 1618)". Encyclopedia Virginia. Retrieved February 18, 2011.
- Kupperman, Karen Ordahl. Indians and English: Facing Off in Early America. Ithaca, NY: Cornell University Press, 2000.
- Lemay, J.A. Leo. Did Pocahontas Save Captain John Smith? Athens, Georgia: The University of Georgia Press, 1992
- Price, David A. Love and Hate in Jamestown. New York: Vintage, 2003.
- Purchas, Samuel. Hakluytus Posthumus or Purchas His Pilgrimes. 1625. Repr. Glasgow: James MacLehose, 1905–1907. vol. 19
- Rolfe, John. Letter to Thomas Dale. 1614. Repr. in Jamestown Narratives, ed. Edward Wright Haile. Champlain, VA: Roundhouse, 1998
- Rolfe, John. Letter to Edwin Sandys. June 8, 1617. Repr. in The Records of the Virginia Company of London, ed. Susan Myra Kingsbuy. Washington: US Government Printing Office, 1906–1935. Vol. 3
- Rountree, Helen C. (November 3, 2010). "Divorce in Early Virginia Indian Society". Encyclopedia Virginia. Retrieved February 18, 2011.
- Rountree, Helen C. (November 3, 2010). "Early Virginia Indian Education". Encyclopedia Virginia. Retrieved February 27, 2011.
- Rountree, Helen C. (November 3, 2010). "Uses of Personal Names by Early Virginia Indians". Encyclopedia Virginia. Retrieved February 18, 2011.
- Rountree, Helen C. (December 8, 2010). "Pocahontas (d. 1617)". Encyclopedia Virginia. Retrieved February 18, 2011.
- Smith, John. A True Relation of such Occurrences and Accidents of Noate as hath Hapned in Virginia, 1608. Repr. in The Complete Works of John Smith (1580–1631). Ed. Philip L. Barbour. Chapel Hill: University Press of Virginia, 1983. Vol. 1
- Smith, John. A Map of Virginia, 1612. Repr. in The Complete Works of John Smith (1580–1631), Ed. Philip L. Barbour. Chapel Hill: University Press of Virginia, 1983. Vol. 1
- Smith, John. Letter to Queen Anne. 1616. Repr. as 'John Smith's Letter to Queen Anne regarding Pocahontas'. Caleb Johnson's Mayflower Web Pages 1997, Accessed April 23, 2006.
- Smith, John. The Generall Historie of Virginia, New-England, and the Summer Isles. 1624. Repr. in Jamestown Narratives, ed. Edward Wright Haile. Champlain, VA: Roundhouse, 1998.
- Spelman, Henry. A Relation of Virginia. 1609. Repr. in Jamestown Narratives, ed. Edward Wright Haile. Champlain, VA: Roundhouse, 1998.
- Strachey, William. The Historie of Travaile into Virginia Brittania. c. 1612. Repr. London: Hakluyt Society, 1849.
- Symonds, William. The Proceedings of the English Colonie in Virginia. 1612. Repr. in The Complete Works of Captain John Smith. Ed. Philip L. Barbour. Chapel Hill: University of North Carolina Press, 1986. Vol. 1
- Tilton, Robert S. (1994). Pocahontas: The Evolution of an American Narrative. Cambridge UP. ISBN 978-0-521-46959-3.
- Waldron, William Watson. Pocahontas, American Princess: and Other Poems. New York: Dean and Trevett, 1841
- Warner, Charles Dudley. Captain John Smith, 1881. Repr. in Captain John Smith Project Gutenberg Text, accessed July 4, 2006
- Woodward, Grace Steele. Pocahontas. Norman: University of Oklahoma Press, 1969.
