= Po-ca-hon-tas, or The Gentle Savage =

Po-ca-hon-tas or The Gentle Savage
- Music: James Gaspard Maeder
- Book: John Brougham
- Basis: Life of Pocahontas
- Productions: 1855; 1869 London

Po-ca-hon-tas, or The Gentle Savage (subtitled "An Original Aboriginal Erratic Operatic Semi-civilized and Demi-savage Extravaganza") is a two-act musical burlesque by John Brougham (words) and James Gaspard Maeder (music). It debuted in 1855 and became an instant hit. Po-ca-hon-tas remained a staple of theatre troupes and blackface minstrel companies for the next 30 years, typically as an afterpiece.

The play parodies the Indian narratives that were popular at the time in the United States, particularly those featuring Indian heroines in the Noble Savage mould, such as The Indian Princess. The burlesque is usually credited with bringing the fad for Indian narratives to an end.

== Production history ==
The piece was reinvented in London at St James's Theatre, where it opened on 27 November 1869 as La Belle Sauvage, with music arranged by W. H. Montgomery. Mrs John Wood played Pocahontas, Lionel Brough was Captain Smith and A.W. Young appeared as Count Rolff (sic).

== Synopsis ==
The plot very loosely follows events in the life of the historical Pocahontas. It begins with the arrival of white men led by John Smith, who says they are there to "ravage the land and steal gold". Smith and company raid the "Tuscarora Finishing School of Emancipated Maidens" and there meet Pocahontas. The remainder of the play revolves around the love triangle formed by Pocahontas, Smith, and John Rolfe, concluding with a card game between Smith and Rolfe for the hand of the Indian princess.

However, Brougham's narrative merely adds some action to what is otherwise a collection of gags and puns rapidly delivered in the form of rhymed couplets. For example:

Pocahontas rushing in heroineically distressed and dishevelled, followed by sailors.

POCAHONTAS

Husband! for thee I scream!

SMITH

Lemon or Vanilla?

POCAHONTAS

Oh! Fly with me, and quit those vile dominions!

SMITH

How can I fly, beloved, with these pinions?

Many of these jokes hinge upon the play's cavalier approach to historical accuracy. For example, in a scene where Smith attempts to win the affections of the Native American princess, she denies him with an appeal to historian George Bancroft:

POCAHONTAS

Stop! One doubt within my heart arises! A great historian before us stands, Bancroft himself, you know, forbids the banns!

SMITH

Bancroft be banished from your memory's shelf,

for spite of fact, I'll marry you myself.

Even the stage directions are written for farce. Upon one entrance of Pocahontas, "her overburdened soul bursts forth in melody." Other directions parody Italian opera: "GRAND SCENA COMPLICATO, In the Anglo-Italiano Style".

Musical numbers to the tunes of popular songs punctuate the jokes. Some of these reiterate the play's theme of the white man despoiling virgin America:

Grab away
While you may

In this game, luck is all

And the prize
Tempting lies

In the rich City Hall.

Grab away
While you may,

Every day there's a job.

It's a fact,
By contract

All intact you may rob.

Theatre companies and orchestra leaders took great liberties with the music, often substituting popular songs with little or no connection to the plot. For an 1860 staging in New Orleans, for example, Mrs. John Wood performed "Dixie" for a concluding scene featuring a Zouave march.

== Historical Context ==
=== Indian Removal ===
This prevalent success of Brougham upon the genre of American burlesque sits mainly on his choice to take a spin-off of such a specific American topic. Po-Ca-Hon-Tas appeared to surpass the usual guidelines of burlesque, lampooning up-to-the-minute dramatic formulas and characters. Po-Ca-Hon-Tas was also “specifically linked to the social and cultural transformations that were taking place in America” during this nineteenth century period. In the heat of century, there was a revolution of sorts happening between the Native Americans and the United States settlers due to the unrest concerning territory and authority. There were some groundbreaking Americans who believed that Indians could embody “what once had been, or yet could be, if only America’s overpowering drive to conquer and contaminate could be reined in”, but regardless of this view, the culture of the Native Americans took on a considerable amount of damage over the course of the nineteenth century. After winning independence from England in 1776, the new United States’ government began taking possession of Indian territories that lay west of the Appalachian Mountains, even though the United States did not yet manifest past that frontier. From this seizure on, there was a rapid fire of treaties and court cases between the American government and the Indian nations. Treaties were considered “legal … agreements between two legitimate governments” – in this case, the United States and an Indian Nation. Whenever an Indian Nation would sign a treaty, it consented to “give the federal government some or all of its land, as well as some or all of its sovereign powers” in exchange for the government's “protection, benefits, and rights” to the Native people. Almost none of these agreements ended well for the Natives, as “Indians saw their lands greatly diminished between 1763 and 1889” and eventually all Natives were forced to relocate to relatively minuscule Indian reservations. Not only did the United States government greatly impose on the Indian's geographical boundaries, but their cultural boundaries as well. The newly created and crammed reservations became a hub for government officials to “civilize Indians” and “prepare them for inclusion into the U.S. polity” – a concept that Pocahontas’ story specifically highlights. In the American perspective, Pocahontas’ conversion to English culture presented the possibility of the “European’s fulfilling their hopes for commercial, religious, and political gains” among the Natives – the idea that drove the condescension and controversy of the time.

=== Jacksonian Democracy ===
In the early 19th century, there was a huge infatuation with Indians, especially Pocahontas, as her story was a prime example of Jacksonian democracy: ‘expansion (nationalism), antimonopoly (egalitarianism) and white supremacy’ . The Jacksonian democracy, an era that defined American beliefs in the early 1800s supported the “Manifest Destiny” (1840), which extended the belief that the United States should extend from the Pacific to the Atlantic coast. Jackson battled Congress in order to pass his Indian Removal Act (1830), which would authorize removal of Native Americans west of the Mississippi River in order to increase United States territory. This only added to American's practice of white supremacy and superiority over inferior races. There was pride in this idea of the eventual submission of the Indians to the whites’ colonizing/ ‘civilizing’ power. People idealized this story as proof that they could change the Indians and win them over to the white side, the “right side.” Pocahontas was this legendary figure, the famous Indian Princess who willingly renounced her own people and culture, converted to Christianity, and married the English colonizer Celebrating these ideas is to inadvertently suppress Indian culture and present it in an inferior to the new “White American” culture. John Brougham's burlesque deeply goes against the ideals of “Jacksonian democracy” by portraying Pocahontas as a satire.

== John Brougham ==
However, before all of this was John Brougham himself. Born in Dublin, Ireland in 1810, Brougham was educated at Trinity College to be a surgeon, but he expended much of his college career partaking in substandard theatre endeavors. He made his true theatrical debut in London in 1830 playing six characters in the play Tom and Jerry. Being the well-rounded theatre man he was, Brougham also became the manager of the Lyceum Theatre in 1840, where he wrote several of his lighter burlesques. Finally in 1842, he made the fateful move to the United States, where he quickly joined in on the theatre scene – managing first the Niblo's Garden, and then opening his own namesake lyceum in 1850, Brougham's Lyceum. It was here that Po-Ca-Hon-Tas was produced and performed originally. Despite his seemingly successful managing career, theatrical business was not Brougham's forte, and he lost his beloved Lyceum to comrade James Wallack, who proceeded to rename the theatre to Wallack's Lyceum. In spite of this, Brougham stayed in the same location and was reported to have been paid $250 a week by Wallack, which according to Moody, in Dramas from the American Theatre, was “the largest salary then paid any artist in a regular New York company.” Brougham was noted to have said that working at Wallack's Theatre was the “brightest part of his life.” Nevertheless, Brougham did manage to write “no fewer than 126 plays, including burlesques, adaptations, Gothic melodramas, tear-jerkers, Irish plays, and social satire." Brougham was one of the first to bring a bit of the action of his plays into the auditorium. “Brougham was not a behind-the-proscenium, peephole-stage, realistic actor.” According to Moody, “He was genial, jovial, hearty, handsome, immensely popular, dashing, clever, and always stylishly dressed.” Many people attended the theatre just to hear his impromptu “before-the-curtain” speeches. He ignored the critic's protests of “impropriety” and gave the audience what they wanted. “Few actors have received the personal acclaim accorded Brougham.” Fulfilling his American dream as both an actor and a dramatist, Brougham earned the “enthusiastic applause of American audiences, the praise of American critics, and the enviable title of America’s Aristophanes.”
