= Powhatan's Chimney =

Early Virginia structure rebuilt as a monument

Coordinates: 37°17′30″N 76°31′52.7″W

Powhatan's Chimney is located at present day Wicomico, in Gloucester County, Virginia, United States.

Powhatan's Chimney was long considered a clue to the site of Werowocomoco, a capital village of Chief Powhatan in what is now Virginia. According to English colonist Captain John Smith, Werowocomoco was located on the north side of the York River about 25 miles (40 km) from where the river divided at West Point, Virginia, at the time the Jamestown Settlement was established in 1607.

Soon after in 1609, Chief Powhatan relocated his capital to a more inland location for better security. The exact location of Werowocomoco was lost through changes in settlement patterns. The Powhatan Confederacy and its people were largely displaced by English settlers by the middle of the 17th century.

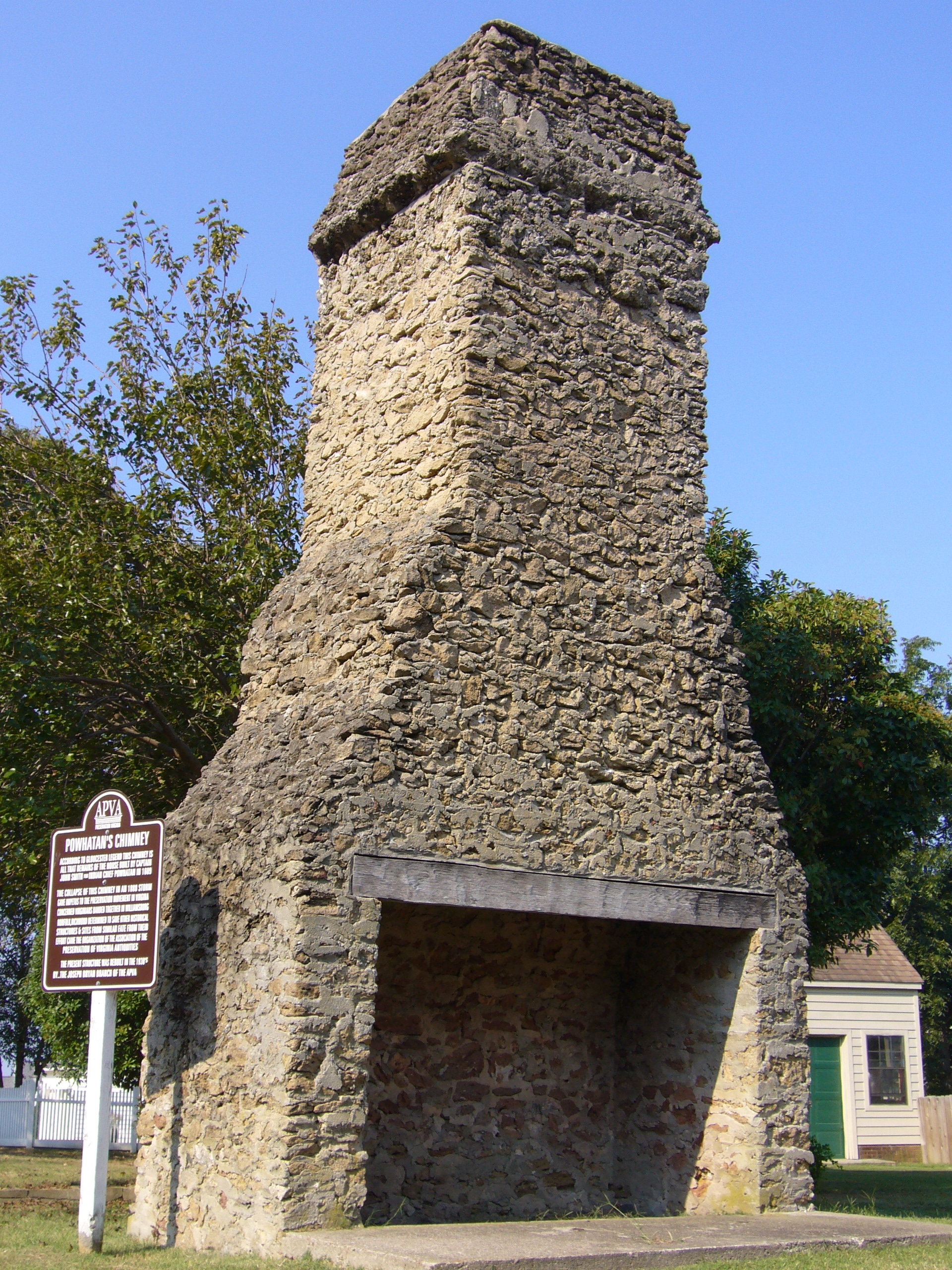
Powhatan's Chimney Monument

Legend tells that Powhatan's Chimney was from a house that Smith built at Werowocomoco for the chief. The chimney's collapse in 1888 led to the growth of a preservation movement, and the founding of Preservation Virginia (formerly known as the Association for the Preservation of Virginia Antiquities). It was organized to protect and preserve other historic resources. This organization reconstructed the chimney in the 1930s in the belief that it represented the historic site of Powhatan's residence at his capital.

In 1977, an archaeologist found ground-surface artifacts at a site further west on the York River on Purtan Bay that indicated a late Woodland/early European contact-era settlement. A 2002 archaeological survey revealed extensive artifacts on what may have been a 50-acre (200,000 m^{2}) settlement, with habitation from the 13th to the 17th century. Archaeologists and anthropologists believe this is the site of Werowocomoco. Since 2003, a team of researchers has excavated and found evidence of a substantial settlement, with earthworks built around the early 15th century, more than 200 years before the English arrived. Representatives of local Virginia Indian tribes, descendants of the Powhatan Confederacy, are part of the team. In 2006 the Werowocomoco Archeological Site was listed on the National Register of Historic Places (NRHP). Scholars hope to find more evidence about the political nature of the chiefdom through additional excavations.

Both the newly identified site on Purtan Bay and Powhatan's Chimney are located within an area which the Native Americans may have considered as Werowocomoco, as their meaning was a general area of lands and not a specific place.
