= Werowocomoco =

Archaeological site in Virginia, United States

- Werowocomoco Archaeological Site
- U.S. National Register of Historic Places
- Virginia Landmarks Register
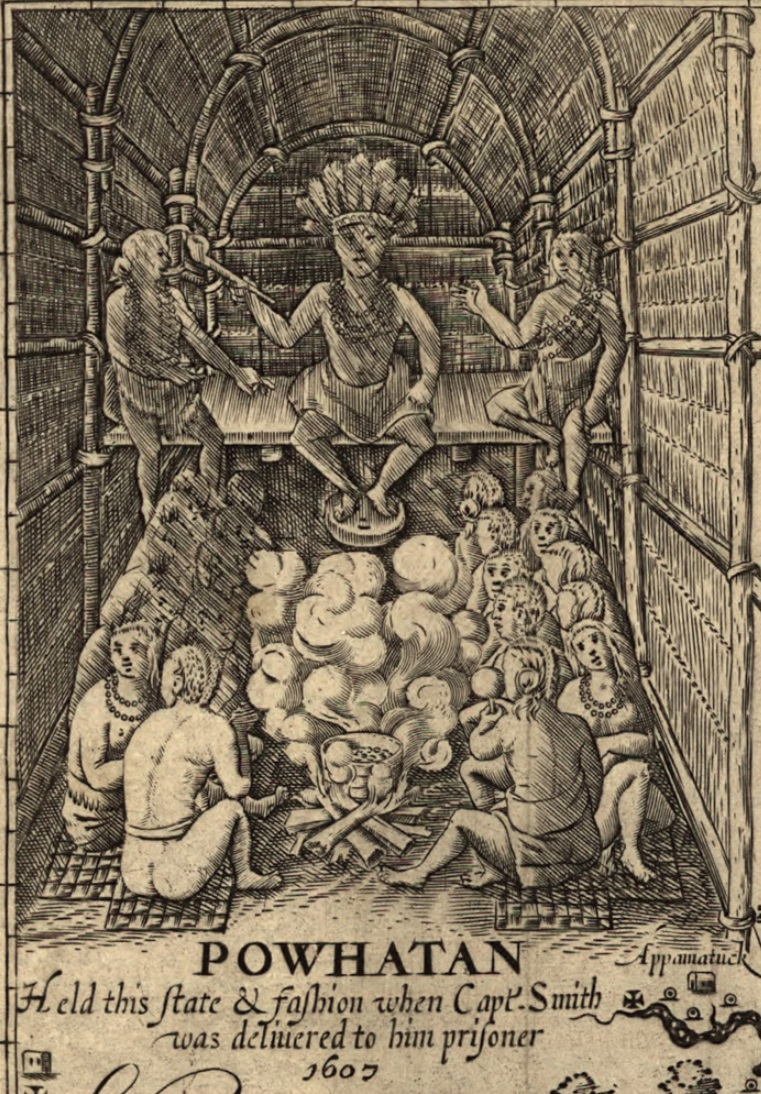
- Powhatan in a longhouse at Werowocomoco (detail of John Smith map, 1612)

- Location within Virginia Location within the United States
- Location: 3051 Ginny Hill Rd., Gloucester, Virginia
- Coordinates: 37.412°N 76.649°W
- Area: 45 acres (18 ha)
- Built: 1607
- NRHP reference No.: 06000138
- VLR No.: 036-5049

Significant dates
- Added to NRHP: March 15, 2006
- Designated VLR: December 7, 2005

Werowocomoco was a village that served as the headquarters of Chief Powhatan. The name Werowocomoco comes from the Powhatan werowans (weroance), meaning "leader" in English; and komakah (-comoco), "settlement".

It existed at the time the English founded the settlement of Jamestown in 1607. The town was documented by English settlers in 1608 as located near the north bank of the York River in what is now Gloucester County. It was separated by that river and the narrow Virginia Peninsula from Jamestown, located on the James River.

Powhatan's Chimney at Wicomico, a site of historical ruins associated with a house purported to have been built for Powhatan, was long thought to have been the site of this capital. Its probable true site was tentatively identified by archaeologists in 2003 at a site on Purtan Bay, further west on the York River. Their survey and excavations revealed extensive artifacts, with habitation from the 13th into the 17th century. Its first settlement was dated about 1270 CE, with complex earthworks built about 1400 CE.

The area that the Native Americans considered Werowocomoco may have included both the newly identified Purtan Bay site and the site of Powhatan's Chimney site. The Gloucester County Board of Supervisors noted that in the Algonquian language the designation for the village of the chief was not a place name, but more correctly translated as a reference to the lands where he lived. The culture frequently relocated quarters within a general area.

== History ==
=== Pre-Columbian ===
Radiocarbon dating of riverfront middens and inland ditch features at the site places the first settlement of Werowocomoco at around 1270 CE. Archeobotanical data indicates a decline in deciduous wood and nutshell from the Middle Woodland period through contact. This corresponds with the establishment of a large settlement, and implies clearing of forest at Werowocomoco as the village grew. Maize was not present at the site in large quantities until the Late Woodland period.

==== Powhatan ====
Werowocomoco first became known to the early English settlers of Virginia as the residence of Wahunsenacawh or Wahunsonacock, the leader or Mamanatowick of the Confederacy. He and his people were known to them as Powhatan, a name derived from his native village, the small settlement of Powhatan, meaning the falls of the river, at the fall line of the James River (the present-day Powhatan Hill neighborhood of Richmond, Virginia later developed on the site).

Wahunsenacawh indicated to John Smith that his rise to power began to the west of Werowocomoco. It is unknown when Wahunsenacawh moved to Werowocomoco. As a place already well-known to his people as a regional center, he may have wanted to make use of it because of its association with previous Native American leaders. While residing there, he received tribute from several Virginia Algonquian tribes in return for providing food in times of famine, military protection, and spiritual powers. Additionally, he distributed sacred materials such as copper and certain colors of shell beads. Werowocomoco was the site of several interactions between Powhatan and the English colonists.

=== Contact with Jamestown ===
Werowocomoco is best known as the site where John Smith, who had been captured by Powhatan's brother Opechancanough while foraging along the Chickahominy River, was taken to meet Powhatan in December 1607. According to Smith's 1624 account, now disputed by most scholars, Pocahontas, daughter of Powhatan, prevented her father from executing Smith at that time. Historians have been skeptical of this account, as Smith did not refer to this purported incident in earlier accounts (1608 and 1612) of the meeting, first recording it only some seventeen years later. By that time Pocahontas had both become a celebrity in England due to her 1616–17 visit there and had died, which allowed Smith to exploit their previous and perhaps actually slight acquaintance without contradiction from her. Severe droughts during the contact period were the likely cause of a decline in maize at Werowocomoco.

=== Abandonment ===
In the early years of the English colony, the settlers suffered severely during the winter, a period known as the Starving Time. In December 1608, Powhatan offered to sell them an entire "shipload of corn in exchange for a grindstone, fifty swords, some guns, a cock and a hen, copper and beads, and some men to build him an English-style house." Smith affected to accept this proposal but instead of giving Powhatan weapons planned to surprise him and take the corn by force. Sending four "Dutchmen" (Germans) ahead by land to work on the house, Smith headed for Werowocomoco by sea on December 29 with a small force. Powhatan may also have been showing bad faith; while en route, Smith received a report at Warraskoyack that the chief was plotting an ambush of his party.

After many stops, Smith arrived at Werowocomoco on January 12, 1609. The next day he was taken to see progress on Powhatan's new house in the vicinity. Smith's men and Powhatan's, after failing to persuade each other to disarm, each tried to ambush the other during the negotiations. After these feints, the English had their corn. Smith's party traveled up the Pamunkey River to trade with Powhatan's brother Opechancanough, whom they threatened at gunpoint to gain food supplies. On returning to Werowocomoco a few days later, they were surprised to find the house unfinished and the entire town abandoned, for which they blamed the Germans. More likely, Powhatan had decided to move to an area less accessible to the troublesome colonists.

Initially, Powhatan made Orapakes his new headquarters; it was located in a swamp at the head of the Chickahominy River (near the modern-day interchange of Interstate 64 and Interstate 295). Subsequently, between 1611 and 1614, he moved further north to Matchut, in present-day King William County on the north bank of the Pamunkey River. After Powhatan's death in 1618, Opechancanough succeeded him as Mamanatowick, though controlling a smaller number of tribes than Powhatan had ruled. He used nearby Youghtanund as his capital, which served, as had Werowocomoco, as the place where he accepted tribute from subject tribes.

=== Evidence of location ===
The location of Werowocomoco was lost from English memories during the 17th century. Scholars believed West Point (a town established at the confluence of the Pamunkey and Mattaponi rivers at the headwaters of the York River) seemed to meet a description of the Powhatan village in the writings of colonist John Smith:

Fourteene myles from the river Powhatan is the river Pamunkee, which is navaginable 60 or 70 myles, but with Cathes and small Barkes 30 or 40 myles further. At the ordinary flowing of the salt water, it divideth itself into two gallent branches. On the South side inhabited the people Toughtamand[?], who haue about 60 men for warres. On the North branch Mattapoment [Mattaponi], who has 30 men. Where the river is divided the Country is called Pamaunkee [Pamunkey], and nourisheth neare 300 able men. About 25 myles lower on the North side of this river is Werawocomoco, where their great king inhabited when I was delivered him prisoner; yet there are not past 40 able men. [sic]

==== Powhatan's Chimney ====
In later years, local people thought that Werowocomoco was located near Powhatan's Chimney, about 25 miles (40 km) east of present-day West Point, Virginia in the area of Timberneck Bay, slightly upstream on the York River from Gloucester Point. The chimney on the site was associated with the uncompleted house John Smith witnessed being constructed for Powhatan, which in local legend became a house built by Smith for Powhatan at the latter's regional village. For this reason, English settlers and their descendants called the area Werowocomoco. Its name was changed to a shorter version, Wicomico, by the US Post Office for ease of use when a post office was established at the village.

==== Rediscovery ====
In 1977, Daniel Mouer, an archaeologist at Virginia Commonwealth University (VCU), identified as the possible location of Werowocomoco a site further west along the York River at Purtan Bay, less than 25 miles (40 km) from West Point and 15 miles (24 km) from Jamestown, about 7 miles (11 km) west of Gloucester. When he collected artifacts from the surface of plowed fields and along the beach, he found fragments of Indian ceramics ranging in time from the Late Woodland Period up to European contact. These indicated that this area was the "possible site of 'Werowocomoco'." Based on his findings, the area was designated a Virginia Historic Site.

In 2002 the Ripleys, then the landowners of the site, authorized additional archaeological exploration of their property. They had already found many ancient projectile points on the surface. Between March 2002 and April 2003, archaeologists conducted a comprehensive archaeological survey of a portion of the property. Initial testing included digging 603 test holes, each 12 to 16 inches (410 mm) deep and 50 feet (15 m) apart. They found thousands of artifacts throughout the site, indicating that it had integrity and had not been much disturbed. These finds included a blue bead possibly made in Europe for trading.

Because these findings showed substantial, extended 50-acre (200,000 m^{2}) settlement and accorded with historical descriptions, they suggested this farm was the former site of Werowocomoco. "We believe we have sufficient evidence to confirm that the property is indeed the village of Werowocomoco", said Randolph Turner, director of the Virginia Department of Historic Resources' Portsmouth Regional Office in 2003. Studies of the early mapping evidence also support scholars' conclusions.

Since 2003, a team of archaeologists and related researchers has been working at this site. They and the landowners initiated consultation with the Virginia Council on Indians to plan and execute excavations on the site. Representatives of local Virginia Indian tribes, some of whom are descendants of the tributary tribes of Powhatan, continue to advise the research. Excavations at the site since 2003 have revealed evidence of a large town, including two 200-foot (61 m)-long, curved, earthwork ditches built 1,000 feet (300 m) from the river bank about 1400, two hundred years before the English first visited the area. In 2006 the Werowocomoco Archeological Site was listed on the National Register of Historic Places (NRHP). In the future, scholars hope to find more evidence about the political nature of the Powhatan polity.

In 2014, President Barack Obama proposed future federal budget funding to acquire this site in Gloucester County to make it part of the National Park System. Under this proposal, Werowocomoco would be formally opened to public visitation under the management of the National Park Service. The National Park Service completed acquisition of the property in the summer of 2016.

== Werowocomoco archeological site ==
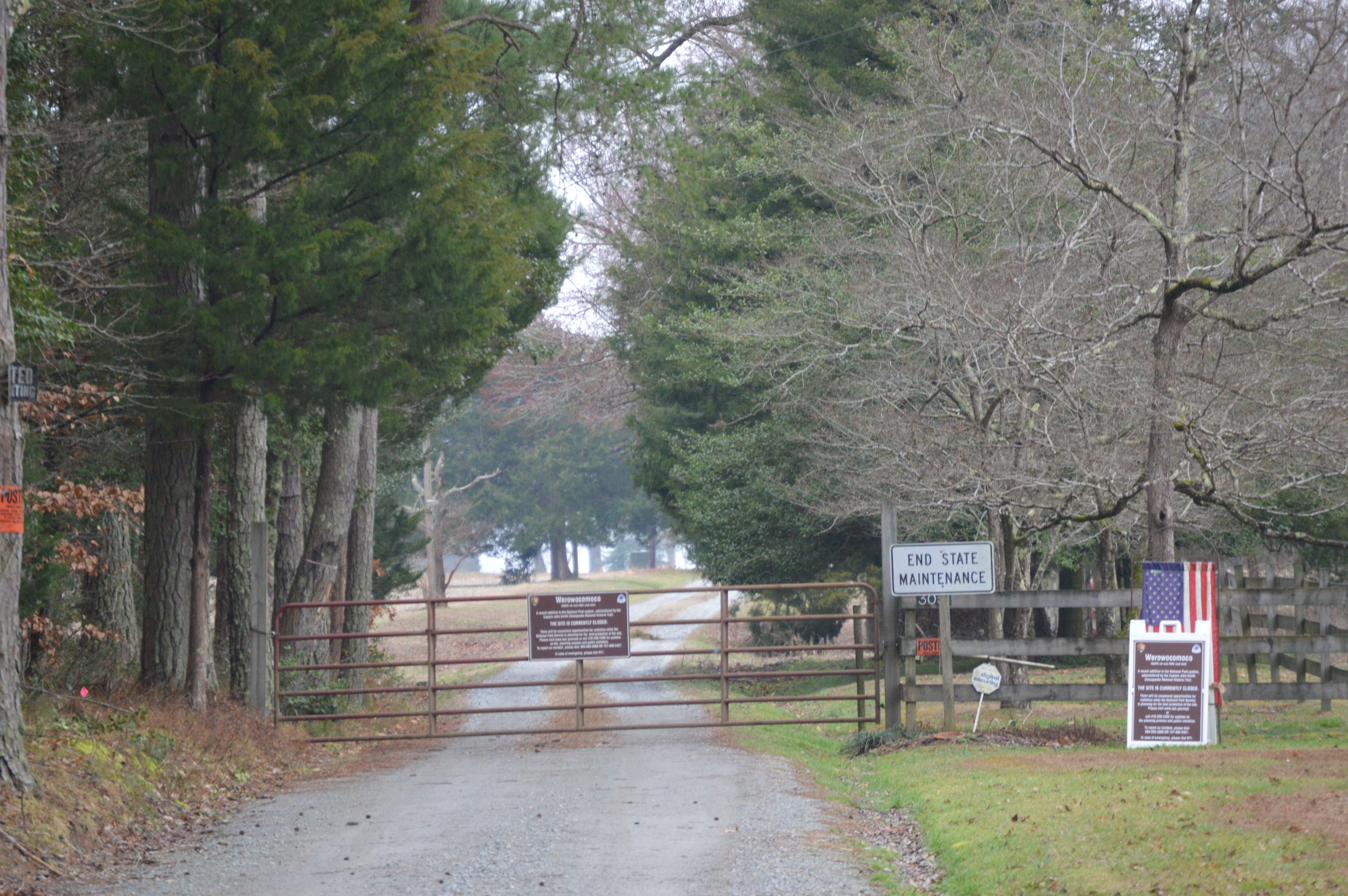
Entrance to the Werowocomoco site

Thane Harpole and David Brown, two Gloucester-based archaeologists, have been instrumental in the work at the Purtan Bay site since 2002. Starting that year, the Werowocomoco Research Group was formed to begin excavations. The Research Group is a collaborative effort of the College of William and Mary, and the Virginia Department of Historic Resources, advised by eastern Virginia tribes.

The excavations revealed a dispersed community of about 50 acres (200,000 m^{2}), occupied from the 13th through the early 17th century (Woodland to early Contact). Artifacts recovered include Native pottery and stone tools, as well as floral and faunal remains from a large residential community. The Research Group has also recovered numerous English trade goods, produced from glass, copper, and other metals, which came from Jamestown. This conforms to colonists' accounts of trading at Werowocomoco; they noted that Powhatan was very interested in English objects, particularly copper, during the early days of the Jamestown colony.

In 2004, researchers discovered two large earthworks: curving ditches, each more than 200 feet (61 m) in length and located about 1,000 feet (300 m) from the river. They may be part of a D-shaped construction noted on John Smith's 1612 map. The researchers have determined the ditches dated from about 1400 CE, indicating Virginia Indians had established long-term settlement at this site more than 200 years prior to the English arrival at Jamestown. Earthwork constructions were often integral to ceremonial centers, and these may have defined or separated a sacred area. Continuing discoveries from excavations are helping scholars understand Virginia Indian-European relations. The period of interaction at this site was brief in relation to the many hundreds of years of prior indigenous settlement.

This project is notable because archaeologists and other researchers have carefully incorporated consultation about planning and executing the excavations with members of the local recognized Virginia Indian tribes. These include the Mattaponi, Pamunkey, and Upper Mattaponi, some of whose people consider such sites sacred, as they include burial artifacts of their ancestors.

When I step on this site folks...I just feel different. The spirituality just touches me and I feel it.

— Stephen R. Adkins, chief of the Chickahominy Tribe and a member of the Virginia Indian advisory board.

Because of the significance of the excavations, in 2006 the Werwomocomo Archaeological Site was listed on the National Register of Historic Places (NRHP).
