= Powhatan (Native American leader) =

Leader of the Powhatan Confederacy (c. 1547 – c. 1618)

- Wahunsenacawh
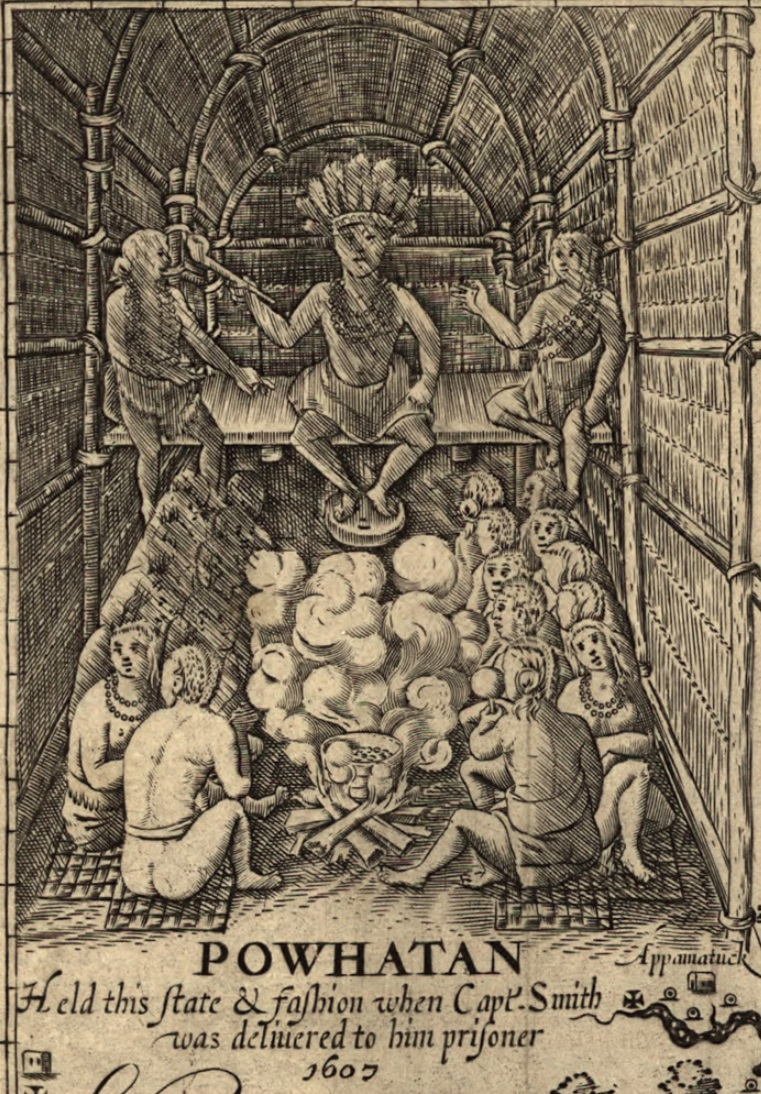
- Powhatan, detail of map published by English colonizer John Smith (1612)

Mamanatowick of the Powhatan Confederacy

Personal details
- Born: c. 1547 Powhatan town
- Died: c. 1618 (aged 70–71) Colony of Virginia
- Resting place: Pamunkey Reservation, King William, Virginia, United States
- Children: Pocahontas and others
- Relatives: Opechancanough (brother); Opitchipan (brother); Kekataugh (brother); John Rolfe (son-in-law)

Powhatan (c. 1547 – c. 1618), whose name is variously rendered as Wahunsenacawh, Wahunsenacah, Wahunsunacock, or Wahunsonacock, was the mamanatowick 'leader' of the Powhatan Confederacy, a confederacy of Algonquian-speaking American Indians living in Tsenacommacah, in the Tidewater region of Virginia at the time when English settlers landed at Jamestown in 1607.

Powhatan, alternately called "King" or "Chief" Powhatan by English settlers, led the main political and military power facing the early colonists, and was probably the older brother of Opechancanough, who led attacks against the settlers in the Indian massacre of 1622 and Third Anglo-Powhatan War in 1644. He was the father of Matoaka (Pocahontas).

== Name ==
In 1607, the English colonists were introduced to Wahunsenacawh as Powhatan and understood this latter name to come from Powhatan's hometown near the falls of the James River near present-day Richmond, Virginia.

Seventeenth-century English spellings were not standardized, and representations were many of the sounds of the Algonquian language spoken by Wahunsenacawh and his people. Charles Dudley Warner, writing in the 19th century, but quoting extensively from John Smith's 17th-century writings, in his essay on Pocahontas states: "In 1618 died the great Powhatan, full of years and satiated with fighting and the savage delights of life. He had many names and titles; his people called him Ottaniack, sometimes Mamauatonick, and usually in his presence Wahunsenasawk." Many variants are used in texts:

- The place: Powhatan, Powatan, Powhaten, Pohetan, Powhattan, Poughwaton
- The description: weroance, weeroance, wyrounce, wyrounnces, werowance, wyroance, werowans (title referring to military leaders)
- The name: Wahunsunacock, Wahunsenasawk, Wahunsenacawh, Wahunsenacock, Wahunsenakah
- The title: Mamanatowick (title referring to the leader of the Confederacy)

== Life ==
Little is known of Powhatan's life before the arrival of English colonists in 1607. He apparently inherited the leadership of about 4–6 tribes, with its base at the Fall Line near present-day Richmond. Through diplomacy or force, he had formed the Powhatan Confederacy from about 30 tribes by the early 17th century. The confederacy included an estimated 10,000 to 15,000 people.

In December 1607, English colonizer John Smith, one of the Jamestown colony's leaders, was captured by a hunting expedition led by Opchanacanough, the younger brother of Powhatan. Smith was taken to Werowocomoco, Powhatan's capital along the York River. Smith recounted in 1624 that Matoaka (Pocahontas), one of Powhatan's daughters, kept her father from executing him. However, since Smith's 1608 and 1612 reports omitted this account, many historians have doubted its accuracy. Some believe that the event Smith recounted as a prelude to his execution was an adoption ceremony by which Smith was ritually accepted as subchief of the town of Capahosic in Powhatan's alliance. As the historian Margaret Williamson Huber has written, "Powhatan calculated that moving Smith and his men to Capahosic would keep them nearby and better under his control."

In January 1609, Smith recorded directing some of his men to build an English-style house for Powhatan at Werowocomoco, in exchange for food supplies for the hungry English colony. Both sides looked for opportunities to surprise one another. Smith proceeded to Opchanacanough's village. When ambushed, he held Powhatan at gunpoint before the warriors. When Smith returned to Werowocomoco, he found the house unfinished and the place abandoned. The men had deserted to the Powhatan side. At a village now called Wicomico in Gloucester County, the reconstructed ruins of what were traditionally believed to be the chimney and part of the building for Powhatan are known as Powhatan's Chimney.

Since 2003, state officials and researchers have concluded the likely site of Werowocomoco is further west along the York River at Purtan Bay. There archeologists have found evidence of a large residential settlement dating to 1200, with major earthworks built about 1400. They have found extensive artifacts, including European goods, which indicate likely interaction with English colonists in the early 17th century. In 2006 the Werowocomoco Archeological Site was listed on the National Register of Historic Places. Excavations continue by a team headed by the College of William and Mary.

Powhatan made his next capital at Orapax, located about 50 miles (80 km) west in a swamp at the head of the Chickahominy River. The modern-day interchange of Interstate 64 and Interstate 295 is near this location. Sometime between 1611 and 1614, Powhatan moved further north to Matchut, in present-day King William County on the north bank of the Pamunkey River, near where his younger brother Opchanacanough ruled at Youghtanund.

By the time Smith left Virginia in 1609, the fragile peace between colonists and Algonquians was already beginning to fray. Soon conflict led to the First Anglo-Powhatan War, and further English colonial settlement beyond Jamestown and into Powhatan's territory. The colonists effectively destroyed two subtribes, the Kecoughtan and the Paspahegh, at the beginning of this war. Powhatan sent Nemattanew to operate against English colonists on the upper James River, though they held out at Henricus. With the capture of Pocahontas by Captain Samuel Argall in 1613, Powhatan sued for peace. It came about after her alliance in marriage on April 5, 1614, to John Rolfe, a leading tobacco planter. John Rolfe was one of Pocahontas's many Jamestown teachers before their marriage; he instructed her in matters of the new culture she was being assimilated into, and he also taught her all about Christianity. According to various accounts, Pocahontas and John Rolfe did, in fact, fall in love with each other—it was a consensual relationship. This might, at least in part, explain Pocahontas's apparent willingness to assimilate, convert to Christianity, and remain with the colonists: she wanted to be with Rolfe. Rolfe's longtime friend, Reverend Richard Buck, presided the wedding. Before the wedding, Reverend Alexander Whitaker converted Pocahontas and renamed her "Rebecca" at her baptism.

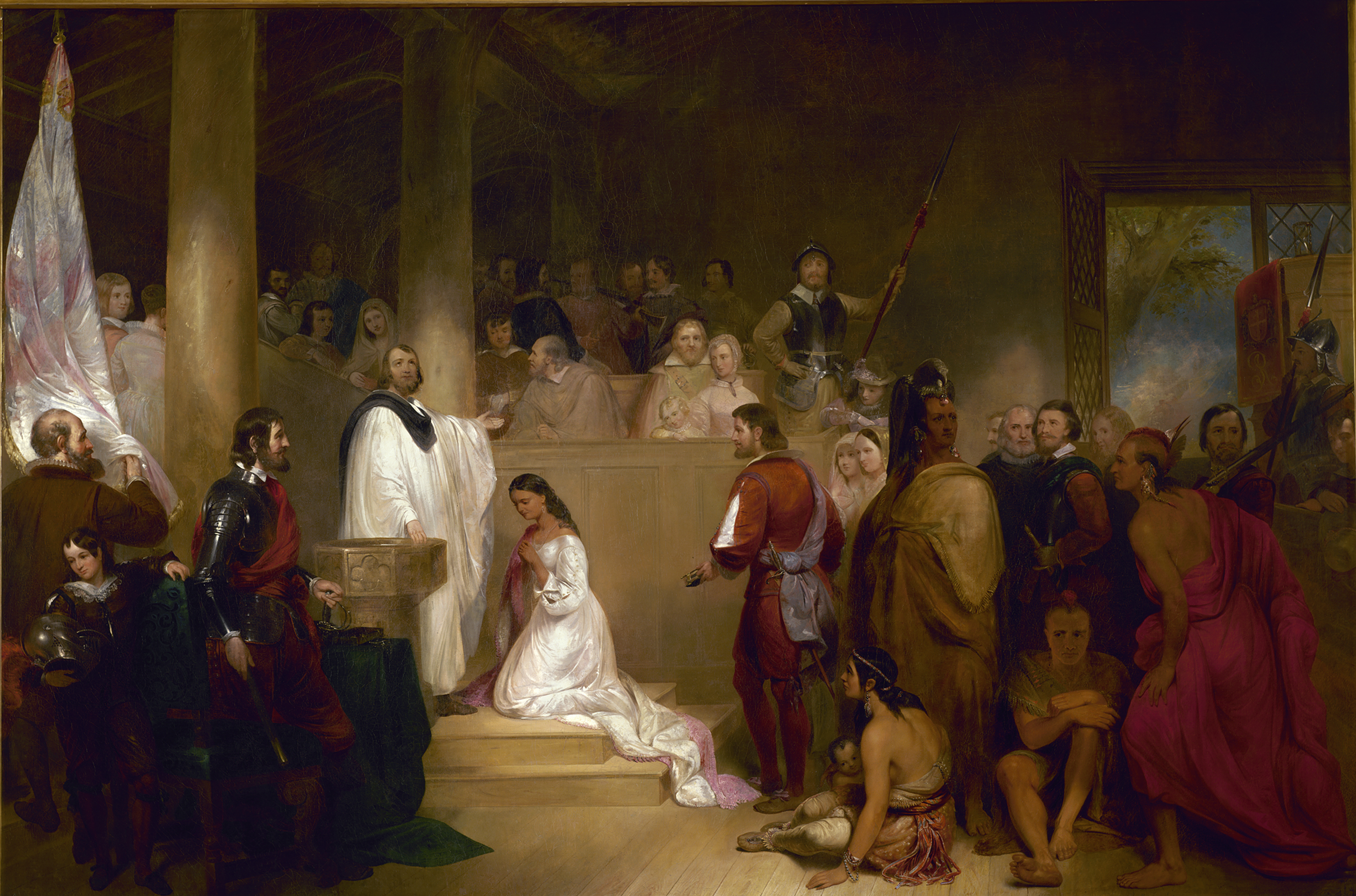
Whitaker (left, in white vestments) as portrayed in Baptism of Pocahontas, 1840, by John Gadsby Chapman

Meanwhile, English colonists continued to expand along the James Riverfront. The aged Powhatan's final years have been called "ineffectual" (Rountree 1990). Opchanacanough became the greater Native power in the region. Upon the death of Wahunsunacock in 1618, his next younger brother Opitchapam officially became Mamanatowick. However, Opchanacanough, the youngest brother, had achieved the greatest power and effectively became the Powhatan. By initiating the Indian massacre of 1622, and attacks in 1644, he attempted to expel the colonists from Virginia. These attempts met with strong reprisals from the colonists, ultimately resulting in the near destruction of the tribe.

Through his daughter Pocahontas (and her marriage to the English colonist John Rolfe), Wahunsunacock was the grandfather of Thomas Rolfe. In 1635 Rolfe returned to Virginia from England. Although Rolfe was raised as an Englishman, he did honor his Native American heritage and even visited his uncle, Opchanacanough, along with his aunt, “Cleopatra” upon returning to Jamestown. His true loyalty remained with the colonists and he was made a commander of James Fort on the Chickahominy after the next war. Like his mother, Pocahontas, Thomas Rolfe was not a celebrity while he was alive. The numerous Rolfe family descendants comprised one of the First Families of Virginia, one with both English and Virginia Indian roots. The modern Mattaponi and Patawomeck tribes believe that Powhatan's line also survives through Ka-Okee, Pocahontas' daughter by her first husband Kocoum.

According to one legend, Powhatan, returning homeward from a battle near what is now Philadelphia, stopped at the Big Spring on Sligo Creek (present-day Takoma Park, Maryland, near Washington, DC) to recuperate from his wounds in the medicinal waters there. Modern historians have dismissed this tale as lacking credibility; nonetheless, a commemorative sculpture of Powhatan has stood at the site since 1985.

== Appearance ==
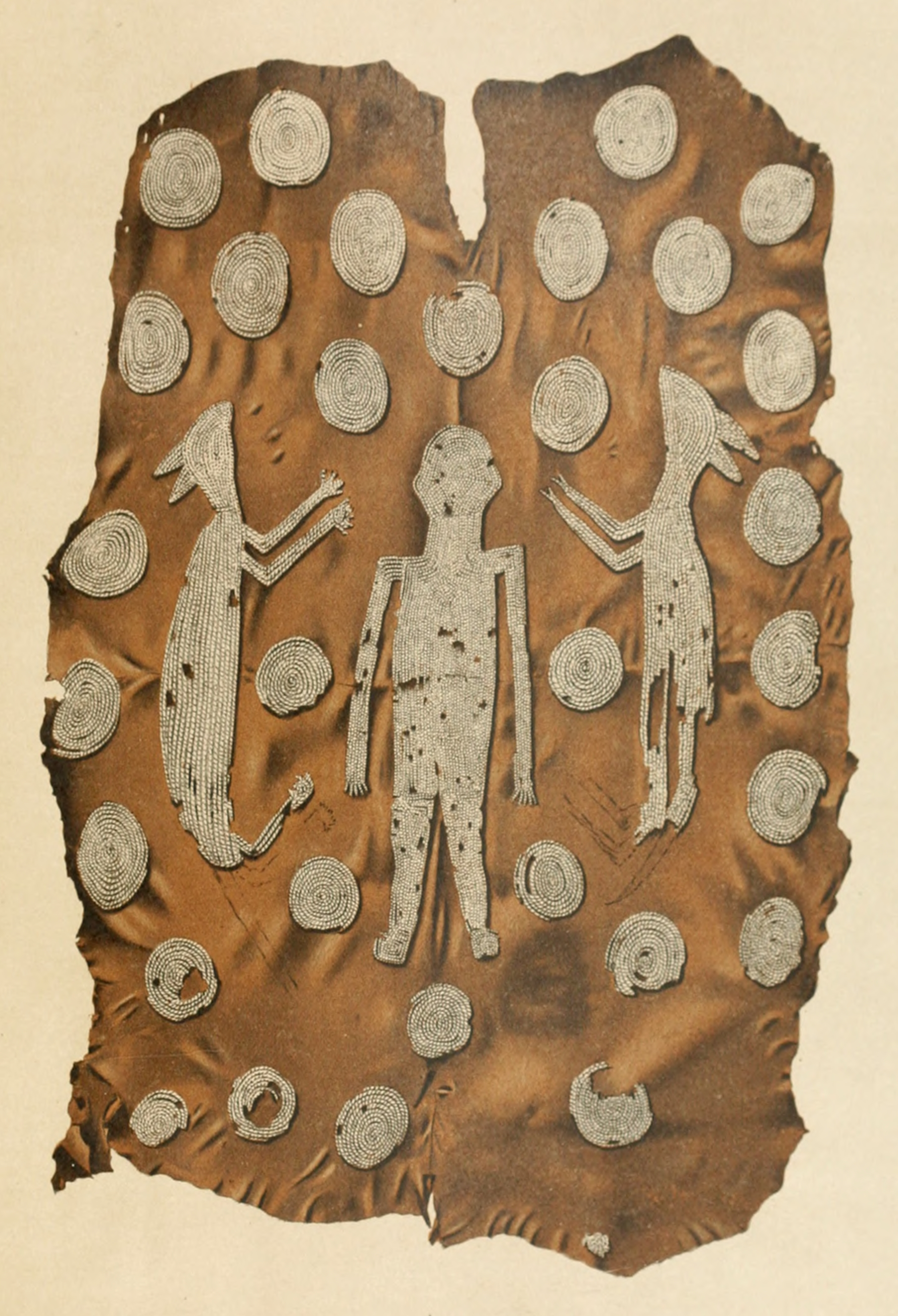
The Mantle of Chief Powhatan

In A True Relation of such Occurrences and Accidents of Note as Happened in Virginia (1608), Smith described Powhatan thus: "[...] their Emperor proudly [lay] upon a bedstead a foot high upon ten or twelve mats, richly hung with many chains of great pearls about his neck, and covered with a great covering of Rahaughcums [raccoon skins]. At his head sat a woman, at his feet another, on each side, sitting upon a mat upon the ground, were ranged his chief men on each side [of] the fire, ten in a rank, and behind them as many young women, each a great chain of white beads over their shoulders, their heads painted in red, and [he] with such a grave a majestical countenance as drove me into admiration to see such state in a naked savage."

"Powhatan's Mantle" is the name given to a cloak of deerskin, decorated with shell patterns and figures, held by the Ashmolean Museum in Oxford. It allegedly belonged to Powhatan, although the evidence is questionable. The Mantle is certainly one of the earliest North American artifacts to have survived in a European collection. It likely belonged originally to a Native American of high social status, as it was decorated with numerous valuable native shell beads.

In his 1906 work Lives of Famous Chiefs, Norman Wood provided a description of Powhatan, based on reports from English colonists. He was said to be a "tall, well-proportioned man with a sower looke, his head somewhat gray, his beard so thinne that it seemeth none at all, his age neare sixtie, of a very able and hardy body, to endure any labor."

== Sites associated with Powhatan ==
- Powhatan's birthplace, known as Tree Hill, is located in present-day Henrico County, near the north bank of the James River. In 2026, a residential development was proposed for the site, and a coalition of Virginia tribal nations rallied to protect the site, describing it as one of the most significant Indigenous sites in the Commonwealth.
- Powhatan's burial mound is located on the Pamunkey Indian Reservation in King William County. The remains were relocated there by his brother, Opchanacanough.
- Powhatan County, although located somewhat to the west of their territory, was named for Powhatan and his tribe.
- In the independent City of Richmond, Powhatan Hill is believed to be located near Powhatan's main village. It was ruled by a subject weroance called Parahunt, or Tanx ("little") Powhatan. On first meeting him, English colonists mistook him for the Great Powhatan. The confusion persists in historic accounts.
- Powhatan's central village, Werowocomoco, is believed to have been located in Gloucester County. The Werowocomoco Archeological Site has been listed on the National Register of Historic Places. Excavations there have revealed much about the early Powhatan people and their interaction with English colonists.

== Tribes associated with Powhatan ==
Powhatan gained control of six tribes when he became chief.

Those six tribes included:

- Arrohattoc (Arro-hattoc/Arrohateck) • Appomattoc (Appomattox) • Mattaponi (Mattapa-nient) • Pamunkey • Youghtanund • Powhatan

Through his chiefdom, Powhatan obtained the following tribes known as the Powhatan Confederacy:

- Accohannock • Accomac • Chesapeake • Chickahominy • Kiskiack (Chiskiack) • Cuttatawomen • Kecoughtan • Moraughtacund (Morattico) * Nandtaughta-cund • Nansemond
- Opiscopank (Piscataway) • Paspahegh • Piankatank • Pissaseck • Patawomeck (Potomac) • Quiyoughcohannock • Rappahannock (Tappahannock) • Sekakawon (Secacawoni)
- Warraskoyack (Warrascocake/Warwick-squeak) • Weanoc (Weyanock) • Werowocomoco • Wiccocomico (Wiccomico).

Preceded by unknown, no prior contact	Weroance unknown–1618	Succeeded by Opchanacanough
