= History of Richmond, Virginia =

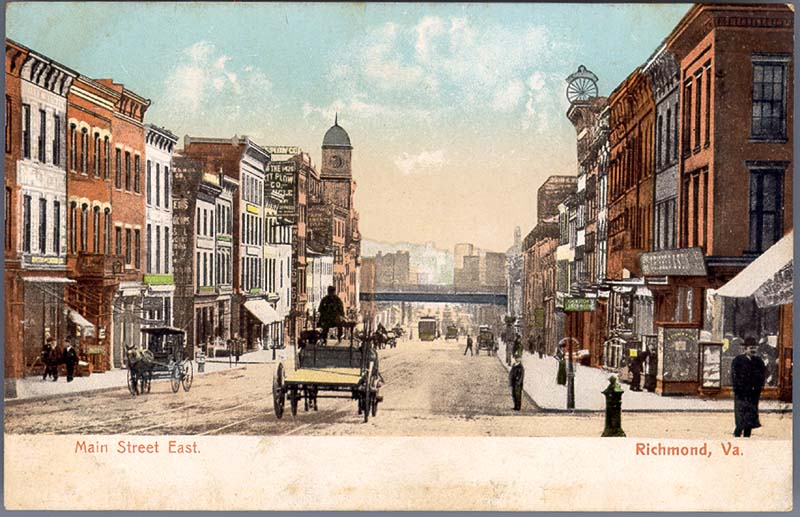
East Main Street, ca. 1900

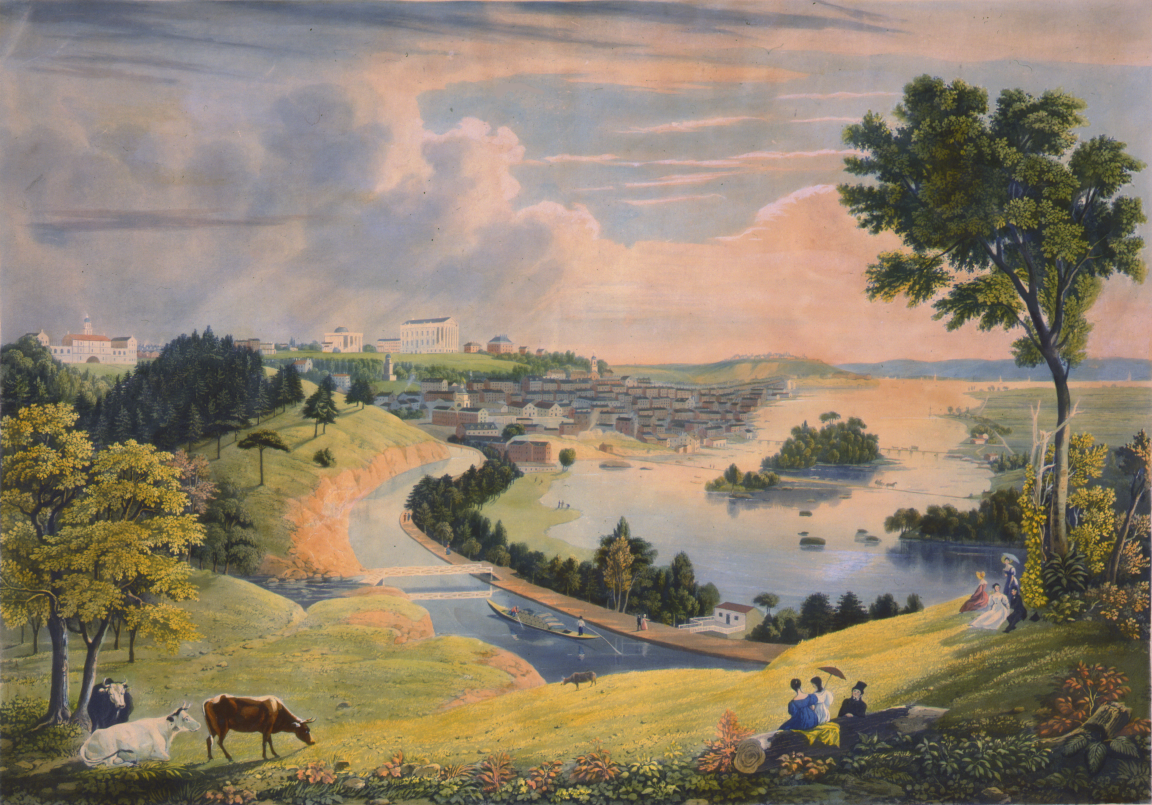
Richmond, from the hill above the waterworks, showing the city ca. the 1830s

The history of Richmond, Virginia, as a modern city, dates to the early 17th century, and is crucial to the development of the colony of Virginia, the American Revolutionary War, and the Civil War. After Reconstruction, Richmond's location at the falls of the James River helped it develop a diversified economy and become a land transportation hub.

== 17th century ==
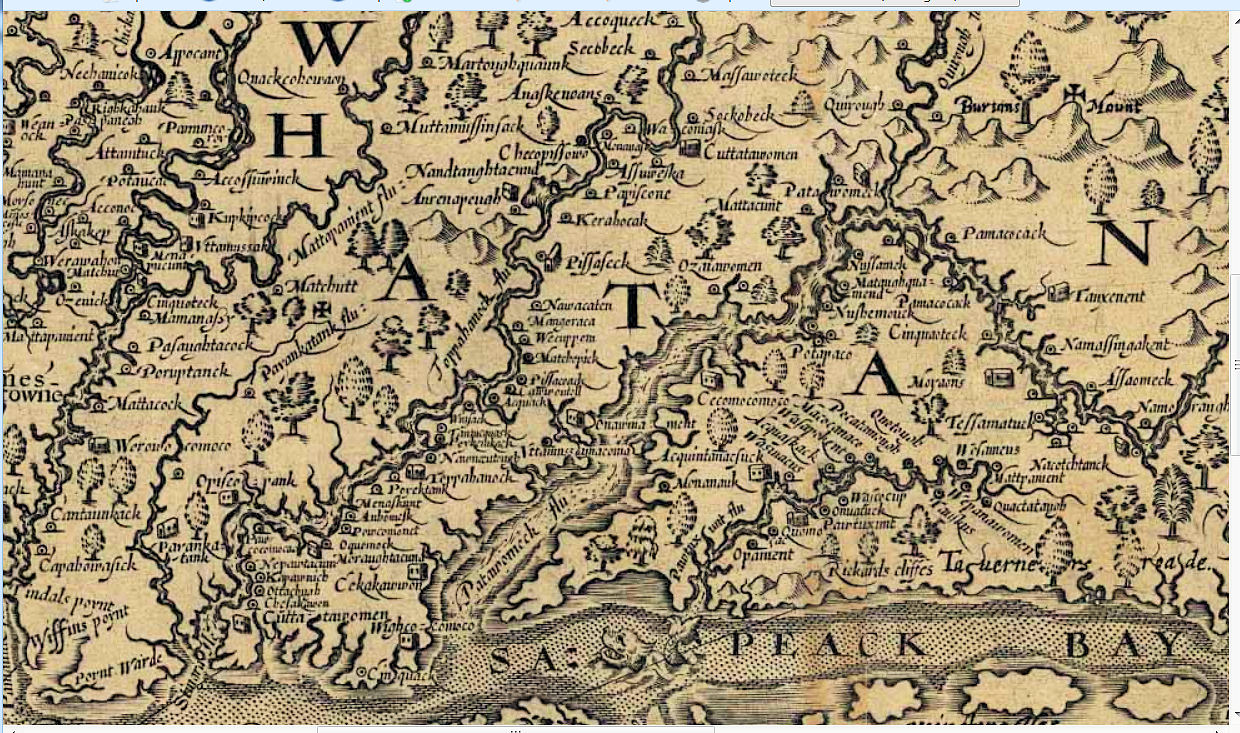
Detail of map made by John Smith in 1608 showing the Patawomeck River

Until 1609, Parahunt, the weroance of the Powhatan tribe, had his main capital on a high hill overlooking the falls of the James, shown as a "king's house" on the 1608 map made by John Smith. The Powhatan "proper" were one of the main constituent groups in the confederacy of the same name, and the river, in their language, was likewise known as the Powhatan. The village where Richmond is now also went by the name of Powhatan (transcribed by William Strachey as Paqwachowng), as well as Shocquohocan.

Soon after settling on Jamestown Island, a party of English under Captain Christopher Newport, during their next exploration up the James, first learned of the existence of this important site from the natives upon reaching Turkey Island on May 22, 1607. The falls marked the western frontier of the confederacy with its enemies, the Monocan tribe, and Newport soon became obsessed with this location and the idea of assisting the Powhatans against them militarily. The next day, while being entertained by a weroance at Arrahatec, the explorers were visited by Parahunt, whom by his title (weroance Powhatan), they mistook for his father, the Mamanatowick Wahunsunacawh (who actually resided at Werowocomoco).

Gabriel Archer, who wrote the fullest account of the visit to Parahunt's village later that day, gave a vivid description of this inhabitation, which he called Pawatah's Tower. He reported that there were 12 houses on the hill, with various crops growing on the plain between the hill and the islands in the river, such as wheat, beans, peas, tobacco, pumpkins, gourds, hemp, and flax. The islands were planted with maize, and had six or seven families living on them. After meeting with the two weroances while the women provided them strawberries and mulberries, the Englishmen decided to visit the nearby waterfalls, found they could pass no farther in their pinnace, and anchored for the night between the islands and the village.

The Christopher Newport Cross monument on the canal, commemorating the cross he erected at the current site of Richmond in 1607.

The following day, Newport shared some of his ship's provisions, pork and peas, with Parahunt, and learned what he could of local geography and politics from him. As they were particularly eager to proceed beyond the falls, Parahunt agreed to meet them there, where he dissuaded Newport from going into Monacan country. Returning downriver, the Captain erected, on one of the islands, a cross reading Jacobus Rex, 1607, declaring the country to be the possession of James I of England; however, he told his guide, Navirans, that the cross signified an alliance between himself and the weroance of Powhatan. Meeting Parahunt one last time, Newport presented him with a gown and an English hatchet, and returned to Jamestown.

The English did not visit the falls again for a year and a half, although during this time they continued attempting to negotiate with the Mamanatowick Powhatan for an assault on the Monacans. After Newport's return from England in September 1608, he unilaterally took a party of 120 soldiers to the falls and explored the country beyond. This upset Chief Powhatan, and the natives at Powhatan village hid their corn, refusing to sell it.

By a year later, in September 1609, Powhatan's people seemed in such awe of the colony's then-President, Captain John Smith, that Smith felt emboldened to send another force of 120 men under Francis West to settle at the falls, in the district known as Rockett's. Smith then personally came to "West Fort" and arranged to purchase the entire Indian village (about 3 miles (4.8 km) from the fort) from Parahunt for an amount of copper and an Englishman named Henry Spelman. Even so, the Powhatans did not fully appreciate that the English were now actually in possession of their fortified town (which Smith had renamed Nonsuch), and thus they began to harass the settlers, eventually forcing West to abandon the project and return to Jamestown. In fall 1610, Lord de la Warre (West's brother) made a second attempt to build a fort at the falls, which managed to last all winter, but was then likewise abandoned.

Following this, the English made no attempt to settle any higher than Henricus (in modern Chesterfield County), which lasted from 1611 until the Indian massacre of 1622. Following the Second Anglo-Powhatan War of 1644–45, the Powhatan tribes signed a peace treaty in 1646 ceding the settlers all territory below the Fall Line, from the Blackwater River to the York River. At this time, the colony built Fort Charles at the falls of the James, near where the legal frontier was for over half a century. After two years, the site of Fort Charles was relocated to Manastoh on the South Side of the river (later known as Manchester, Virginia), where the ground was considered slightly more fertile.

In 1656, several hundred Nahyssans and Mahocks and Rechahecrians (possibly Erie) threatened both the Powhatans and the English by settling near the falls; a combined force of English and Pamunkeys was sent to dislodge them in Battle of Bloody Run, where the Pamunkey weroance Totopotomoi was slain.

Col. David Crawford, a Virginia Burgess 1692–94, owned much of the land in the latter 17th century that would become Richmond. By around 1699 or 1700, the Monacan had abandoned their closest settlement, Mowhemencho, above the falls at Bernard's Creek — which was then repopulated with French Huguenot pioneers, to serve as a further buffer between the downriver English plantations and the native tribes. The name of the Huguenots' village survives today in that of the Richmond suburb of Manakin-Sabot, Virginia.

In 1673, William Byrd I was granted lands on the James River that included the area around Falls that would become Richmond and already included small settlements. Byrd was a well-connected Indian trader in the area and established a fort on the site. William Byrd II inherited his father's land in 1704.

== 18th century ==
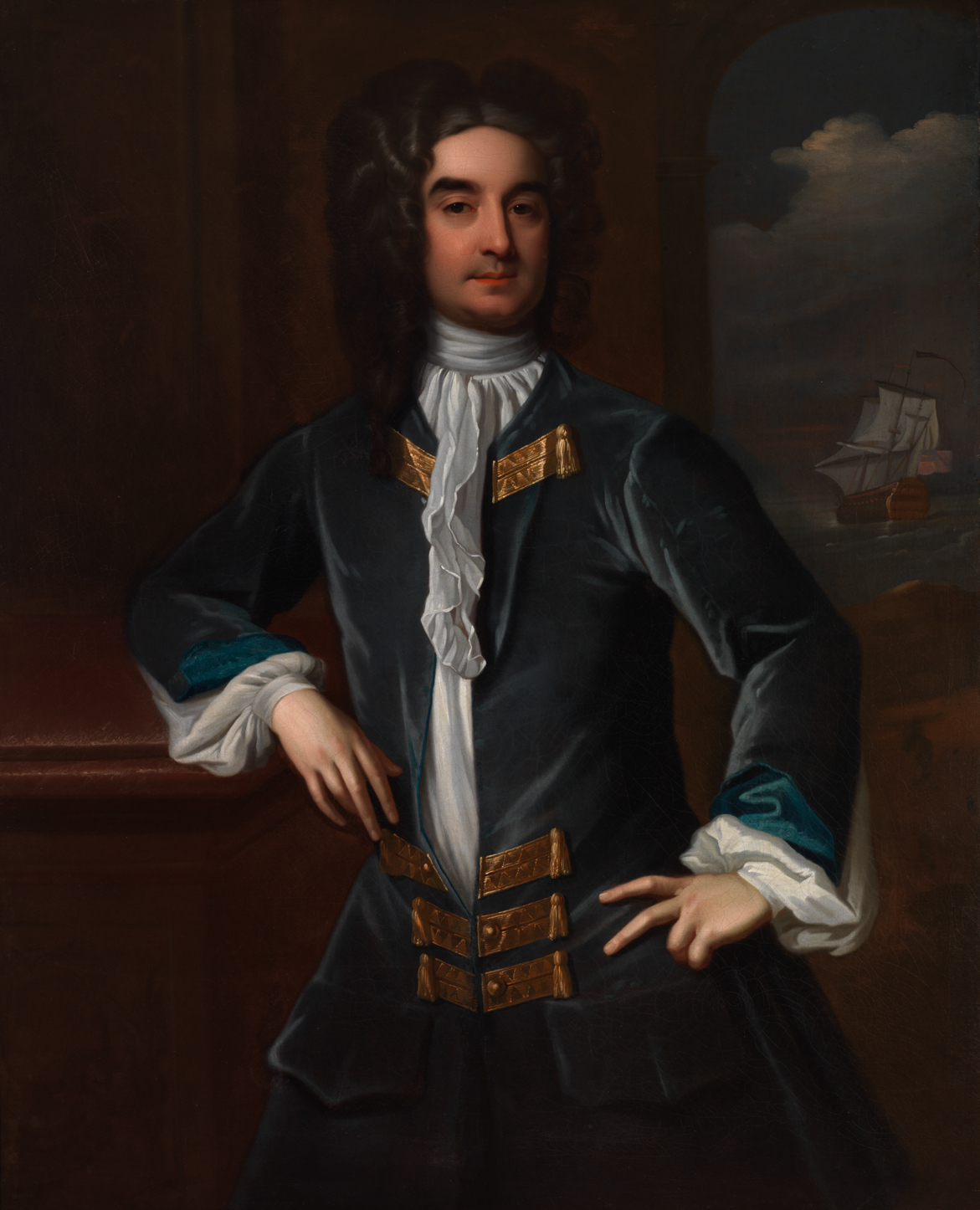
William Byrd II, founder of Richmond.

By the early 18th century, the population of the area was still below 200. In 1730, the Virginia House of Burgesses passed the Warehouse Act, which required inspectors to grade tobacco at 40 different locations. This led to much development at the Falls of the James. Seven years later, in 1737, William Mayo laid out the original street plan for the town of Richmond, on land provided by Colonel William Byrd II of nearby Westover Plantation. Mayo divided the town into four-lot thirty-two squares, and immediately outside of town limits there were larger plots of land which were to be sold as the future sites for suburban villas. The name came from Richmond, England. In 1741, Henrico Parish Church (affiliated with the Church of England) was built in the present day neighborhood of Church Hill, the oldest neighborhood in the city, overlooking downtown Richmond, Shockoe Bottom and Shockoe Slip. The First Great Awakening impacted the area in the 1740s, leading Samuel Davies to be sent from Pennsylvania in 1747 to lead and minister to religious dissenters in Hanover County, Virginia. He eventually helped found the first presbytery in Virginia (the Presbytery of Hanover), evangelized slaves (remarkable in its time), and influenced young Patrick Henry who traveled with his mother to listen to sermons. Richmond was chartered as a town in 1742. By 1768, William Byrd III had squandered the family fortune and resorted to a public lottery to raise money for his debts. He auctioned off large lots of still-undeveloped Byrd family land in the Richmond region.

=== Revolutionary War ===
In 1775, Patrick Henry delivered his famous "Give me Liberty or Give me Death" speech in what is now known as St. John's Church, during the Second Virginia Convention. This speech helped convince members of Virginia's House of Burgesses (that Governor Dunmore had tried to dissolve in Williamsburg the previous year) to pass a resolution delivering Virginia troops to what became the American Revolutionary War.

Another year later, the Continental Congress adopted the Declaration of Independence, and the colonists' revolt became official (and Virginia's delegates in turn signed the resolution drafted by Thomas Jefferson upon a Virginia model). Jefferson became Virginia's governor during the war, although he had to flee British raiders and pass through Richmond several times. In 1780, Virginia's state capital was officially moved from Williamsburg to Richmond. During the war, British troops captured Williamsburg and often raided Virginia towns accessible by water (including Richmond). The worst raid to befall Richmond (a port city at the falls of the James River) occurred in 1781, when troops under the command of the turncoat Benedict Arnold burned Richmond and its neighboring port at Warwick. Yet Richmond recovered, and grew such that in May 1782, the Virginia General Assembly meeting in Richmond incorporated it as a city.

In 1785, the General Assembly laid the cornerstone for the Virginia State Capitol, which Jefferson designed. Also that year, it chartered the James River Company, with soon-to-be U.S. President George Washington as its honorary corporate president, in part because Washington had advocated westward canal development. Development of the James River Canal (ultimately to connect to the Kanawha River across the Appalachian Mountains) ensued. This led to Richmond's further development as a commercial (and slave-trading) center. The first bridge across the James River, named Mayo's Bridge after the town's founder, was built in 1787.

The General Assembly passed the Virginia Statute for Religious Freedom, which Jefferson had drafted in 1779, in Richmond on January 16, 1786, which is now commemorated annually as National Religious Freedom Day. From 1785 to 1787, the oldest Masonic Hall in America still in continuous use was constructed on Franklin Street between 18th and 19th Streets in downtown Richmond.

Virginia ratified the proposed U.S. Constitution on June 26, 1788, after a tumultuous and nearly month-long Virginia Ratifying Convention held at the Richmond Theatre. This averted the potential problem of a geographical split between states previously ratifying the document which created a stronger national government than in the previous Articles of Confederation. The Virginia Ratifying Convention also recommended adoption of a Bill of Rights modeled on one previously adopted in the Commonwealth, as eventually occurred on December 15, 1791.

== 19th century ==
=== 1800–1860: Antebellum period ===
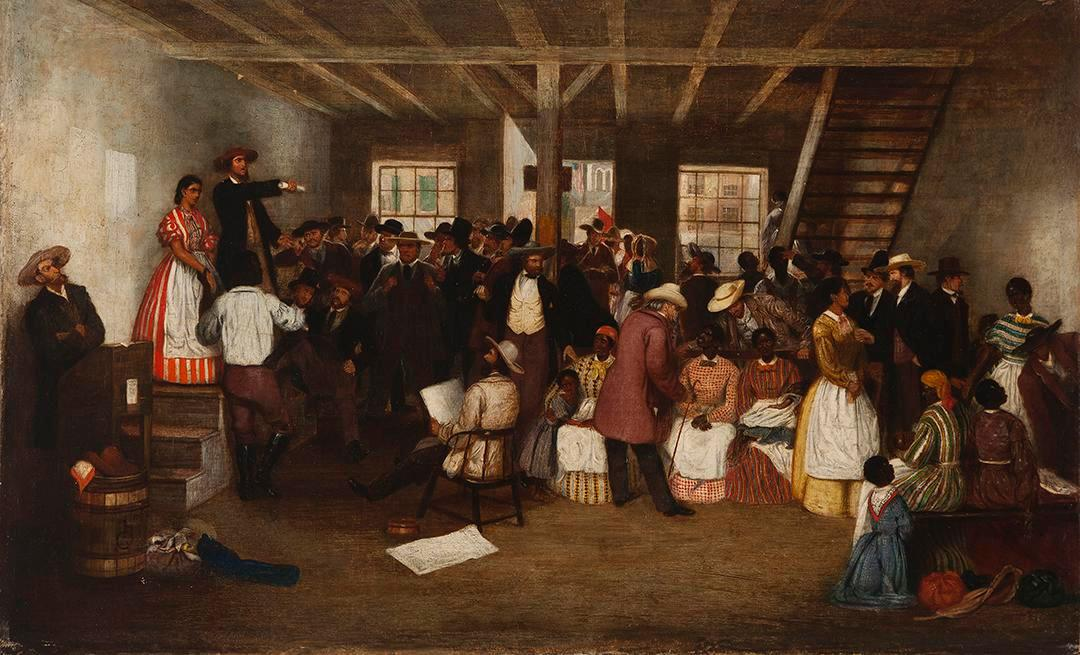
Slave Auction in Richmond, Virginia, 1862

For much of the 19th century, the institution of slavery shaped several local issues. Shockoe Bottom became a center for slave trading in the years after Congress prohibited the US-African Slave Trade in 1808. It is believed that between 1800 and 1865, 300,000 slaves were sent from Virginia, a majority of them from Richmond's Shockoe Bottom markets and auctions, to work in the deep south.

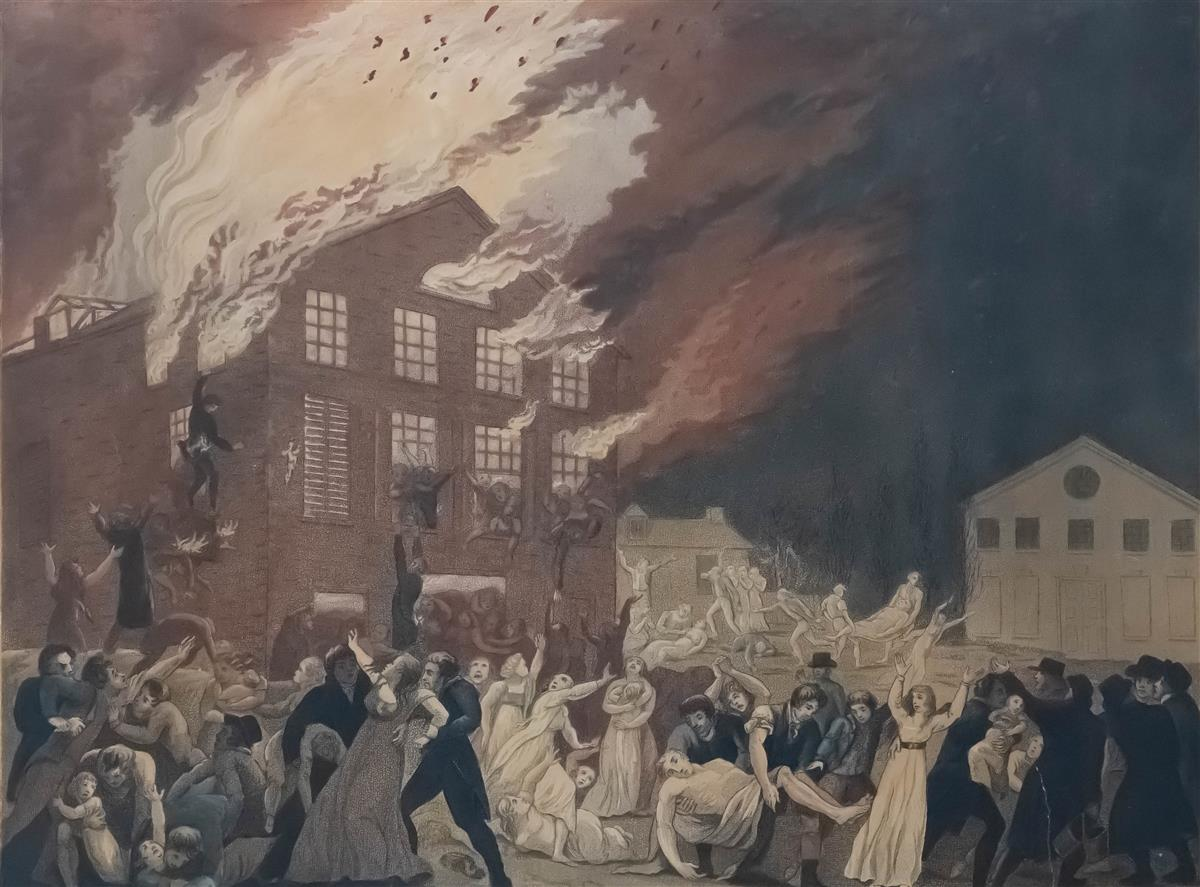
Depiction of the Richmond Theatre fire of 1811

The first municipal burial ground dedicated expressly for Negroes (enslaved) and free people of color by the city of Richmond was the Shockoe Bottom African Burial Ground and was noted on the 1809 Plan of Richmond as the "Burial Ground for Negroes". A new historic highway marker was erected at the burial ground in October 2024, and is located at the corner of N 16th St., and E Broad St. In 1810 free Black Richmonders petitioned for a new site, and in 1816 the Shockoe Bottom African Burial Ground was closed and two new burying grounds were opened, The "Burying Ground for Free People of Colour", and the "Burying Ground for Negroes (Slaves)". Both plots consisted of one acre each and were located directly east of the Jew's Burying Ground (Hebrew Cemetery) on the opposite side of 5th St. at what is now Hospital St. It was established within the 28 1/2 acre city of Richmond Property on which the Poorhouse was located on Shockoe Hill. An extension of the original two acres was made before 1835, and again in 1850 that grew the burial ground to as many as 15 acres. It appears on the 1853 Smith Map of Henrico County by two names, the "Shockoe Hill Burying Ground" on the county portion of the map, and the "African Burying Ground" on the separate city portion of the map. This cemetery now called the "Shockoe Hill African Burying Ground", is also presently referred to by some as the "2nd African Burial Ground" or "second African Burying Ground"; it was a segregated part of the "Shockoe Hill Burying Ground" also known as the Shockoe Hill Cemetery. It is likely the largest burial ground for enslaved and free people of color in the United States, with over 22,000 interments estimated. This burial ground had no historical marker, or signage of any kind. By 1906 it no longer appeared on any maps. It had long been miss-defined, and on the surface rendered invisible. It has suffered numerous atrocities over time. In 2021 it was added to Historic Virginia's list of Virginia's list of most endangered historic places. However, through advocacy, some progress has been made. In 2021 the city of Richmond reclaimed a 1.2 acre parcel of the 31 acre burial ground. On June 12, 2022, an Historical Highway Marker was unveiled at the site that was sponsored by the Virginia Department of Historic Resources. In March 2022 the Shockoe Hill African Burying Ground was also added (as part of the Shockoe Hill Burying Ground Historic District) to the Virginia Landmarks Register, and in June 2022 to the National Register of Historic Places. Some progress has clearly been made for the burial ground's recognition, however, it remains an endangered site.

Following the Haitian Revolution of the late 18th century (1791–1804), slaveowners were faced with the prospect of similar slave uprisings in the American South. A thwarted major uprising known most popularly as Gabriel's Rebellion, occurred near Richmond in 1800. This uprising was rumored to have involved 1000–4000 free and enslaved Africans living in the Richmond-Henrico-Chesterfield-Dinwiddie-Caroline-Hanover areas, and perhaps as far southeast along the James River as Norfolk. By the start of the 19th century, the city's population had reached 5,730.

Several other important events took place in Richmond early in the century, including the designation of Jefferson, Madison and Monroe as Richmond's first political districts in 1803; the charter of the Bank of Virginia, the city's first bank, was signed in 1804; and the first public library was established by the Library Society of Richmond in 1806. The first stagecoach lines to Richmond were established during the War of 1812, and the first regular steamboat service began on the James River in 1815. In 1816, the first City Hall was built.

==== Industrial revolution ====
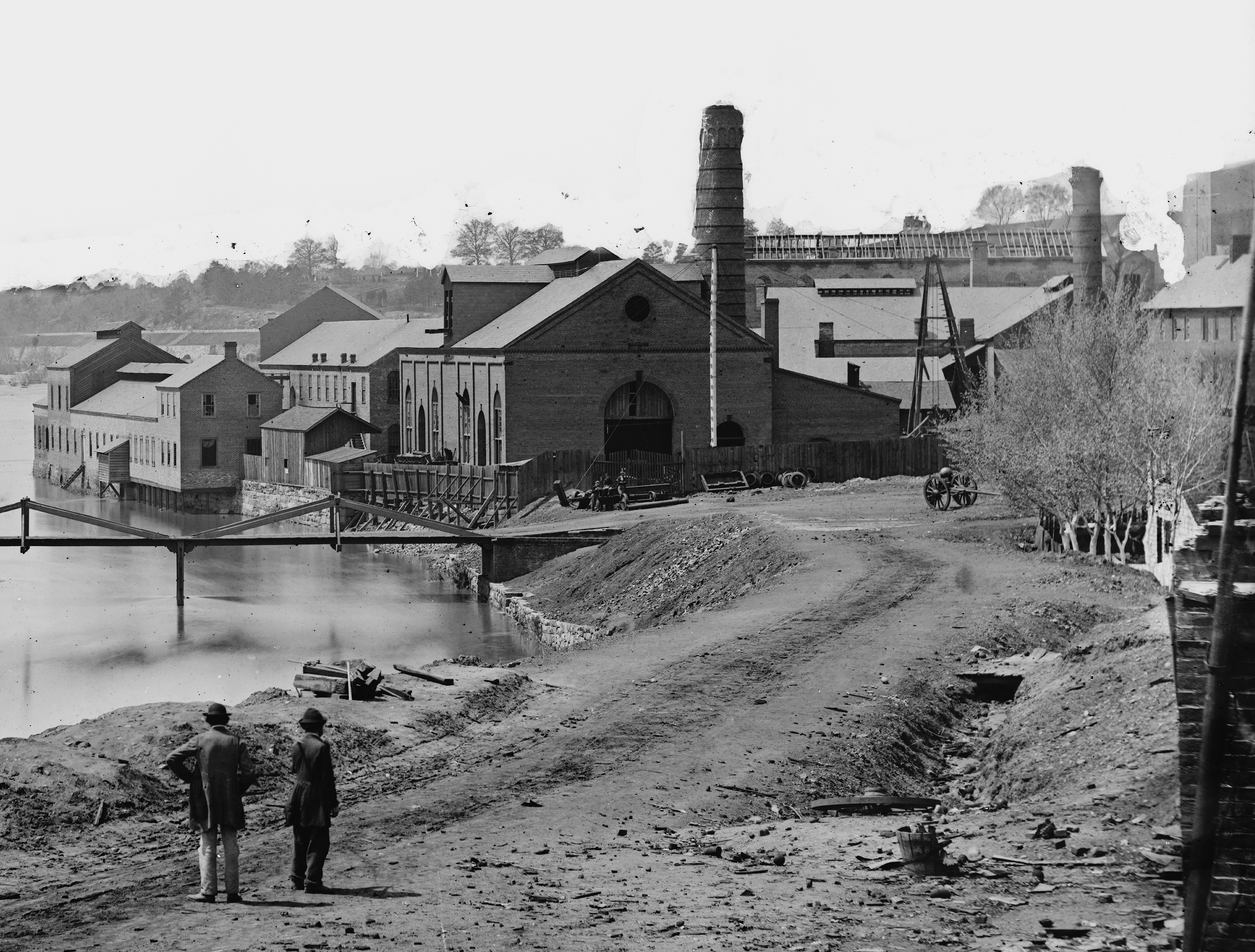
Tredegar Iron Works, along the banks of the James River, in Richmond, Virginia.

In the 1830s, the Industrial Revolution arrived in Richmond. In 1831, the Chesterfield Railroad Company opened its horse-drawn rail line between Manchester and the Chesterfield coal mines, just south of the city. In 1833, Rhys Davies, an engineer from Tredegar, South Wales, was hired by Richmond businessmen and industrialists to construct furnaces and rolling mills used in the iron and foundry business. By 1837 the rolling mills were merged with the Virginia Foundry, creating Tredegar Iron Works, the largest foundry in the South and the third-largest in the United States. The first steam locomotive service to the city began with the Richmond, Fredericksburg and Potomac Railroad in 1836. Other railroads followed: the Richmond and Danville Railroad was chartered in 1847, and completed the circuit to Danville, Virginia by 1854. In 1838, the Medical College of Virginia was founded in the city. Besides transportation and industry, antebellum Richmond was also the center of regional communications, with several newspapers and book publishers, including John Warrock, helping shape public opinion and further the education of the populace.

The aversion to the slave trade was growing by the mid-19th century, and in 1848, Henry "Box" Brown made history by having himself nailed into a small box and shipped from Richmond to Philadelphia, Pennsylvania, escaping slavery to the land of freedom.

=== 1861–1865: The Civil War ===
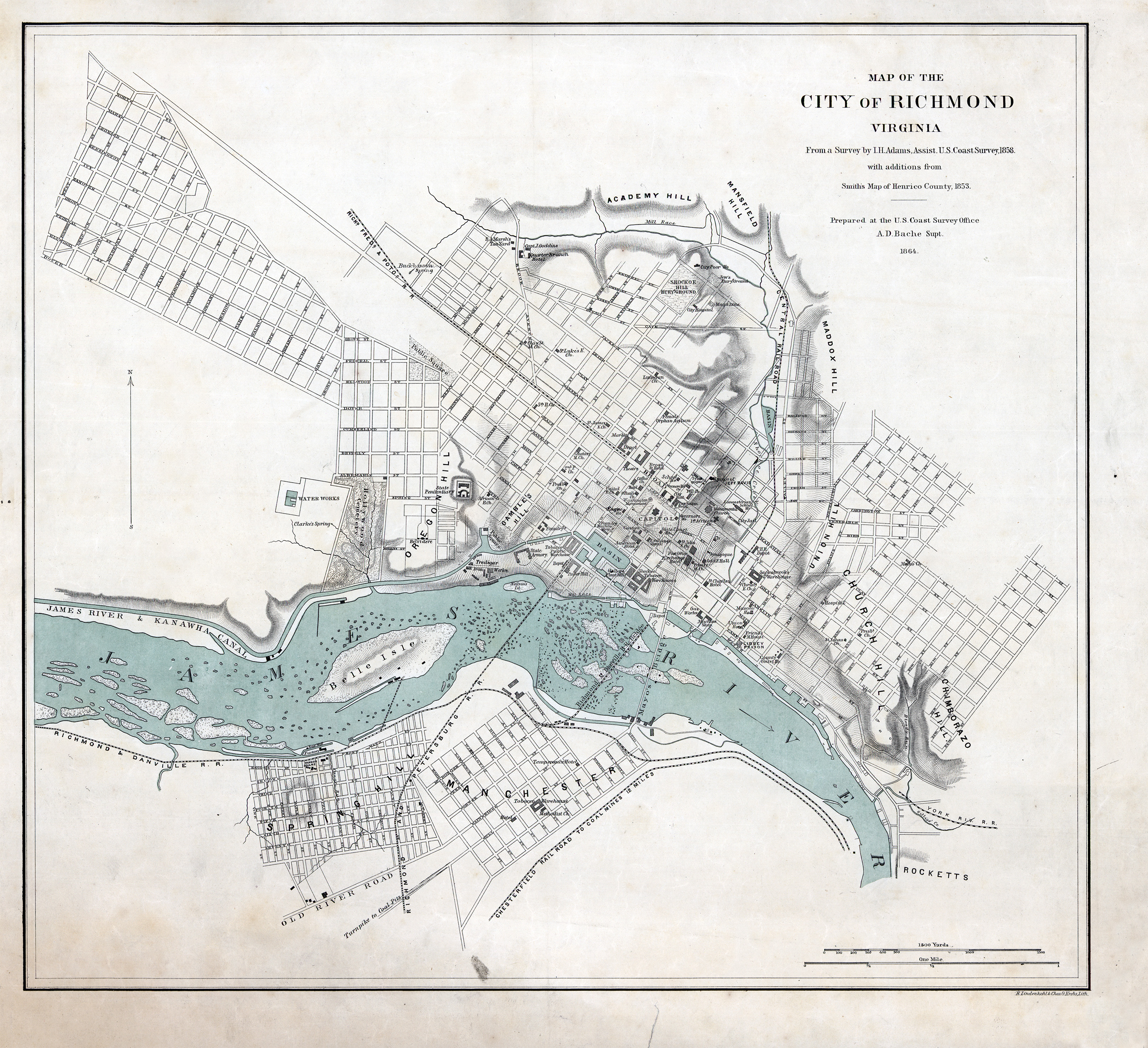
Map of Richmond during the war

In February 1861, Jefferson Davis was inaugurated as President of the Confederate States of America in Montgomery, Alabama. Two months after Davis' inauguration, the Confederate army fired on Fort Sumter in Charleston, South Carolina, and the Civil War had begun. With the outbreak of war, followed by Virginia's secession in May 1861, the strategic location of the Tredegar Iron Works was one of the primary factors in the decision to relocate the capital of the Confederacy to Richmond. From this arsenal came much of the Confederates' heavy ordnance machinery, making 723 tons of armor plating that covered the CSS Virginia, the world's first ironclad used in the two-day Battle of Hampton Roads in March 1862, against the USS Monitor.

In 1862, the Peninsula Campaign, led by General George B. McClellan, was a Union attempt to take Richmond, beginning from Union-held Fort Monroe at the eastern tip of the Virginia Peninsula at Old Point Comfort. Efforts to take Richmond by the James River were successfully blocked by Confederate defenses at Drewry's Bluff, about 8 miles (13 km) downstream from Richmond. The Union march up the Peninsula by land culminated in the Seven Days Battles. Ruses to make the defending forces seem larger by General John B. Magruder, Richmond's defensive line of batteries and fortifications set up under General Robert E. Lee, a daring ride around the Union Army by Confederate cavalry under General J.E.B. Stuart, and an unexpected appearance of General Stonewall Jackson's famous "foot cavalry" combined to unnerve the ever-cautious McClellan, and he initiated a Union retreat before Richmond. Even as other portions of the South were falling, the failure of the Peninsula Campaign to take Richmond led to almost three more years of bitter and bloody warfare between the states.

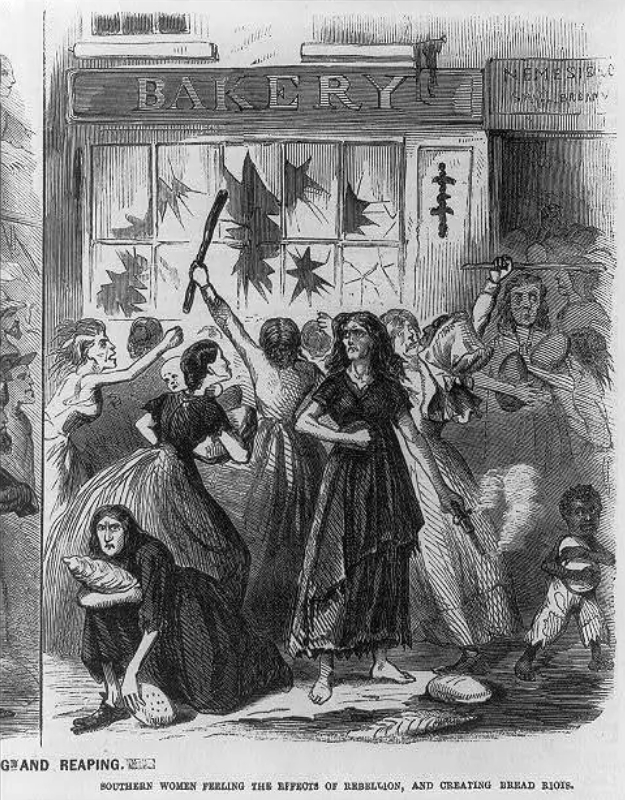
Bread riots in Richmond

On April 2, 1863, the city was beset by a large bread riot as housewives could no longer afford very high food prices and broke into stores. The militia was called out.

After a long siege, Union General Ulysses S. Grant captured nearby Petersburg in April 1865.

As the fall of Petersburg became imminent, on Evacuation Sunday (April 2), President Davis, his cabinet, and the Confederate defenders abandoned Richmond, and fled south on the last open railroad line, the Richmond and Danville. The retreating Confederate soldiers received orders to set fire to bridges, the armory, and warehouses as they left. The fires spread out of control, and destroyed large parts of the city, reaching to the very edge of Capitol Square mostly unchecked. At dawn, Richmond's mayor and other civilians went to the Union lines east of Richmond on New Market Road (now State Route 5) and surrendered the city; Union troops entered and eventually quenched the flames.

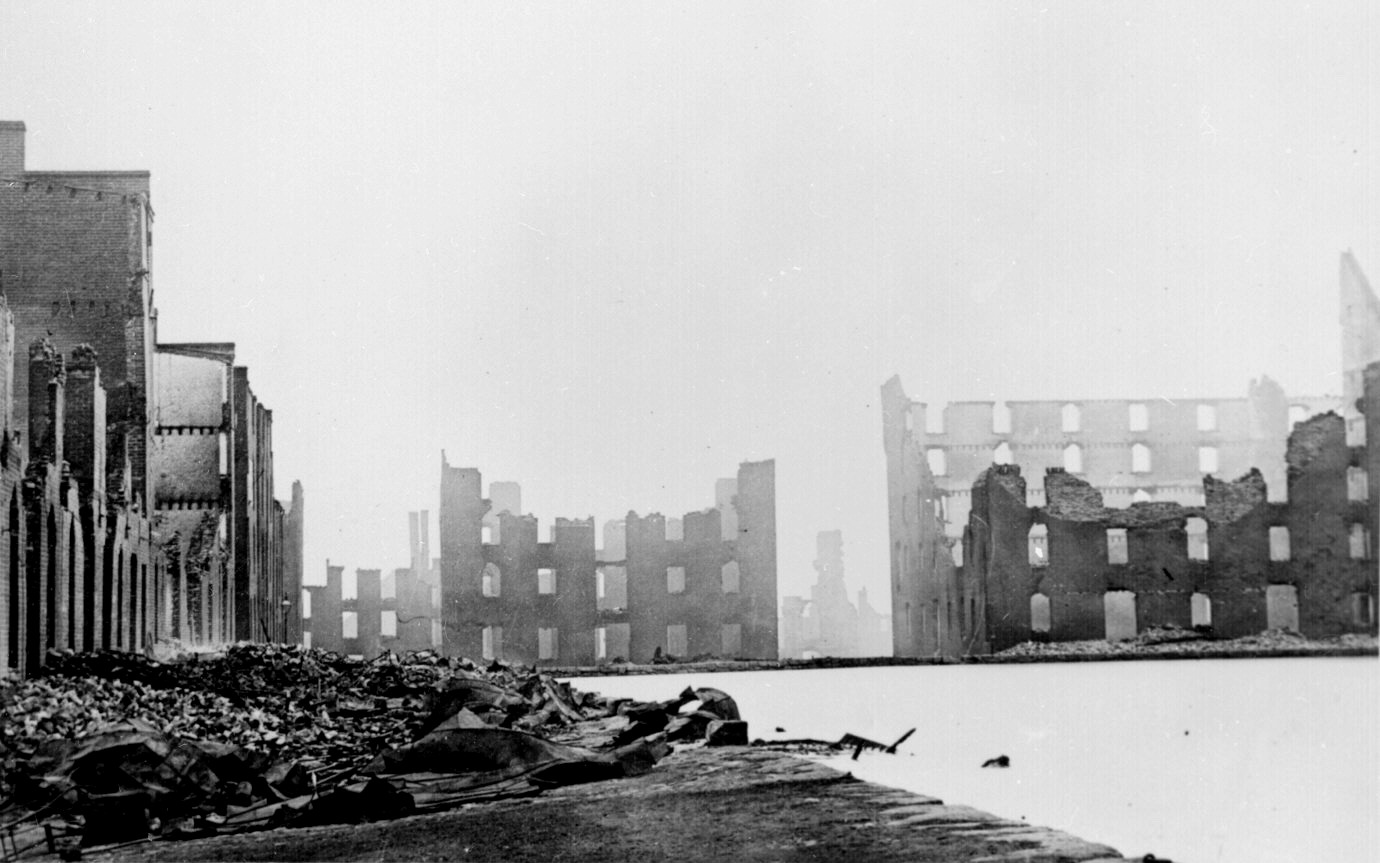
Shells of the buildings of Richmond, silhouetted against a dark sky after the destruction by Confederates, 1865.

On April 4, President Abraham Lincoln toured the fallen city by foot with his young son Tad, and visited the former White House of the Confederacy and the Virginia State Capitol. Arriving as fires set by the retreating Confederates still smoldered, Lincoln went to the White House of the Confederacy, expecting a communication from the retreating forces. Some wanted him to make a public gesture of sitting at Jefferson Davis's own desk, symbolically saying to the nation that the President of the United States held authority over the entire land. Citizens and freed slaves greeted Lincoln as a conquering hero. One admirer reportedly said, "I know I am free, for I have seen the face of Father Abraham and have felt him." When a general asked Lincoln how the defeated Confederates should be treated, Lincoln replied, "Let 'em up easy."

In the meantime, the governor and top officials relocated briefly to Danville. About a week after Richmond's evacuation, Robert E. Lee surrendered to Grant, ending the Battle of Appomattox Courthouse. Within the same week, on April 14, 1865, President Lincoln was assassinated at Ford's Theatre in Washington, D.C. by John Wilkes Booth. Northern leadership would deal much more harshly with the fallen states than Lincoln had planned.

On May 25, 1865, Francis Harrison Pierpont of Fairmont, West Virginia, moved the seat of government of "restored" Virginia from Alexandria back to Richmond. The Virginia General Assembly was once again located in the State House in Richmond.

During President Andrew Johnson's administration, Governor Pierpont was replaced as Governor on April 4, 1868, by General Henry H. Wells of New York, who was formerly under the command of Brever Major General John Schofield. Pierpont and his family returned home to Fairmont.

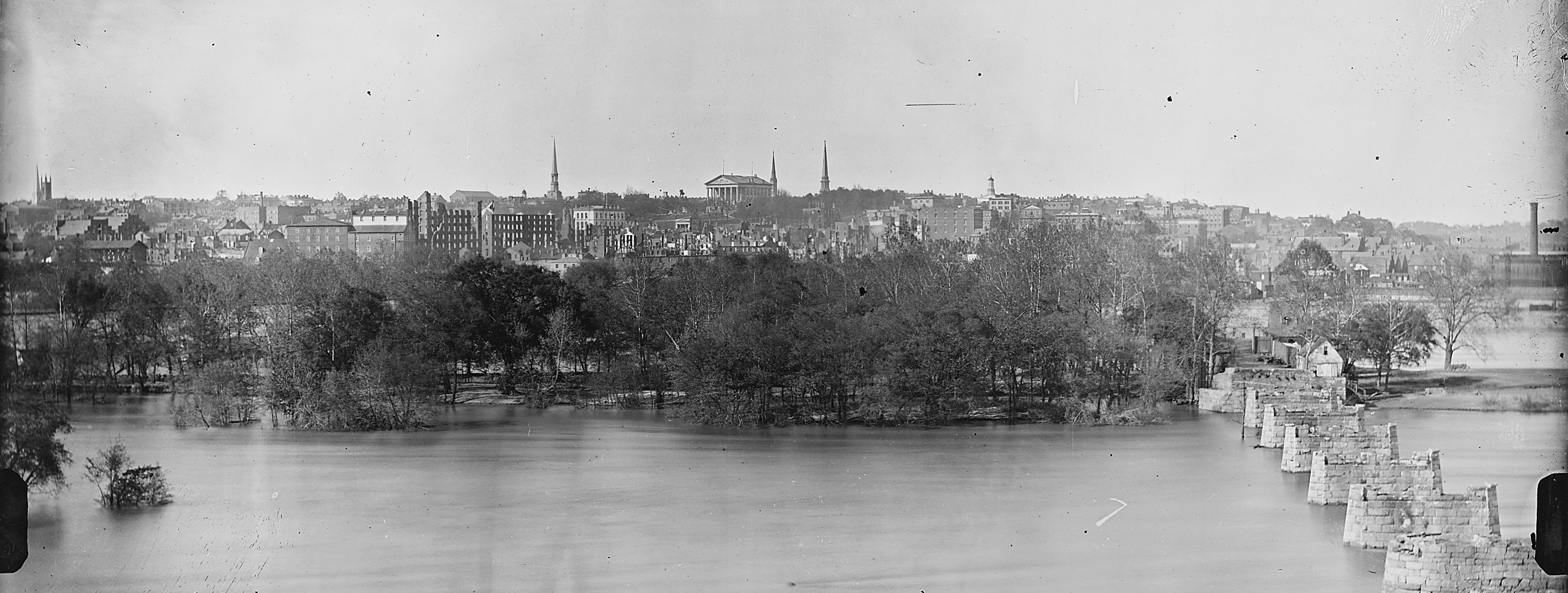
Richmond skyline after the Evacuation Fire of 1865.

=== 1865–1880: Reconstruction and City growth ===
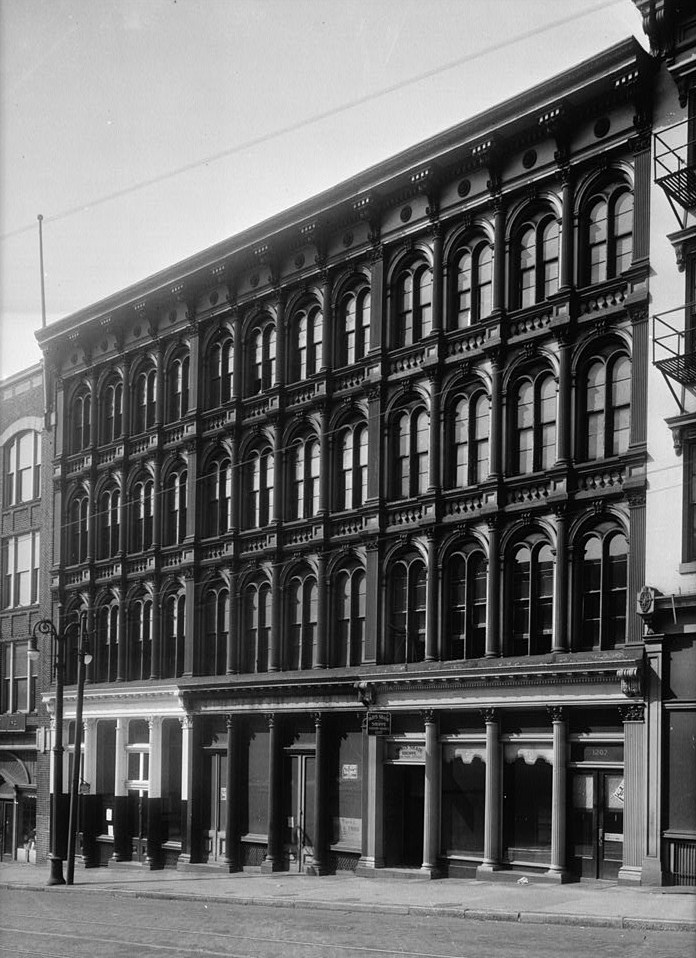
The Donnan Block (1866), constructed in the ashes of the Evacuation Fire.

In 1865, the Thirteenth Amendment to the United States Constitution abolished slavery. Richmond (and the South's) Reconstruction began. Richmond's Theological School for Freedmen, later becoming Virginia Union University, was established that year. (Today, the historic campus is located on Lombardy Street just north of the downtown area).

In 1866, the first organized Memorial Day was celebrated in Richmond at Oakwood Cemetery near Church Hill on the Nine Mile Road. Many fallen Confederate troops were buried there and at Hollywood Cemetery, just west of the Tredegar Iron Works in Richmond.

In 1869, the segregated public school system was started in the city. Black voters registered in the city's first municipal election since the end of the Civil War. One year later, Virginia was readmitted to the Union with a new Constitution and federal troops were removed from the city.

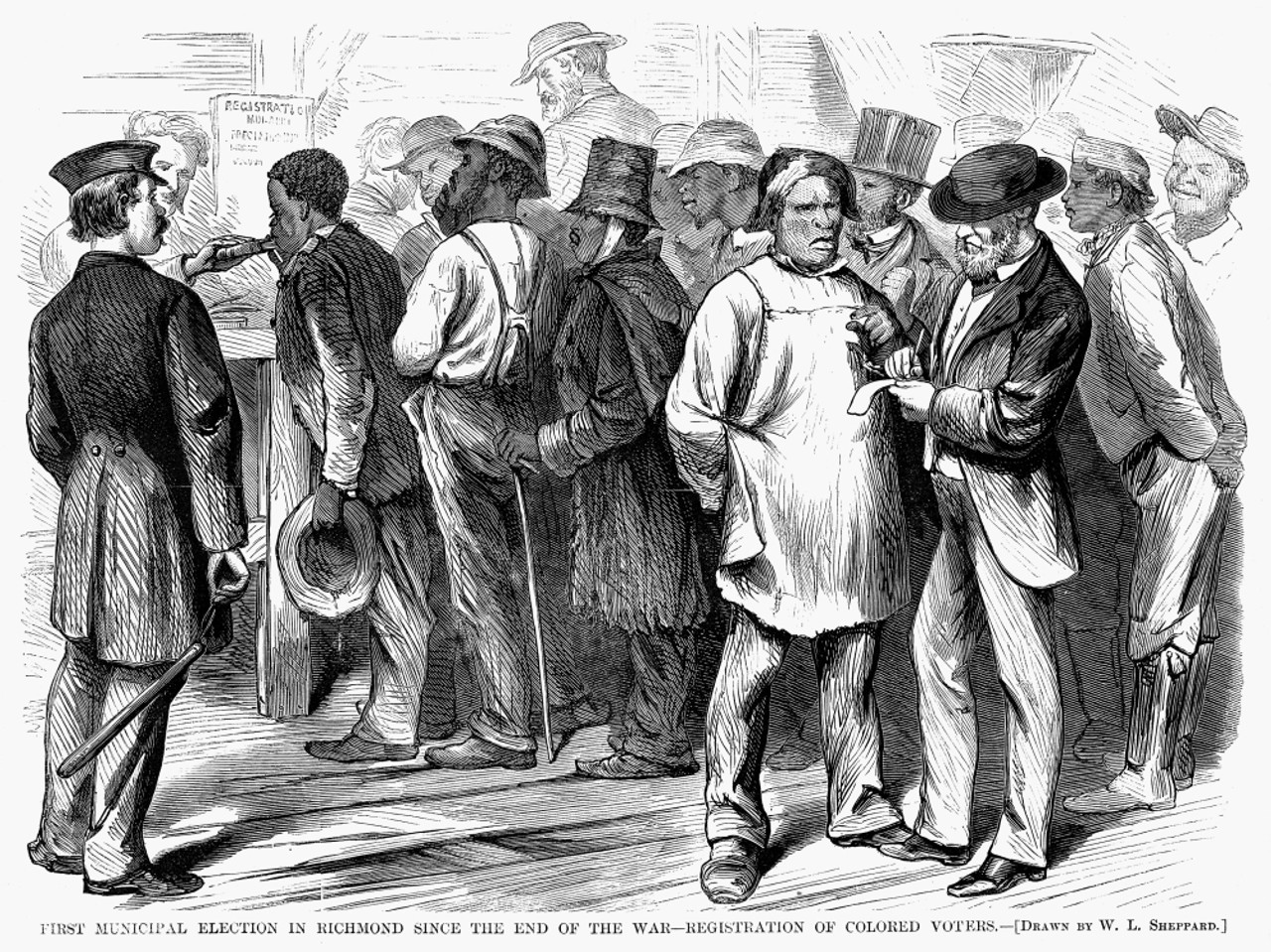
Freedmen registering to vote in 1870 in the first municipal election in Richmond held after the end of the Civil War

1870 has been called the Year of Disasters: the worst flood in 100 years occurred; overcrowding during a court hearing over Richmond's elections collapsed the third floor of the Virginia State Capitol, causing it to fall into the Hall of the House of Delegates, killing 60 and injuring 250; Robert E. Lee's death in Lexington, where he headed what is now Washington and Lee University, compounded grief, followed by the Spotswood Hotel fire, killing eight people. Over the next decade, the city's first high school, Richmond High School, opened in 1873. Cigarette manufacturing was introduced in Richmond by P.H. Mayo & Bros. Tobacco Co. in 1874, further expanding the city's economic importance to the tobacco industry. The last federal troops were removed from the South in 1877, and Reconstruction ended.

Virginia politics underwent many power struggles in the 1870s and 1880s. Conservatives split over repayment of the state's pre-war debt. "Funders" wanted the full amount to be paid, much of which was held by northern interests. "Readjusters" wanted a portion to be paid by the new State of West Virginia, and formed the Readjuster Party, a coalition of Republicans, conservative Democrats, and free blacks led by railroad executive William Mahone. Mahone was elected to the U.S. Senate, where he served from 1881 to 1887, and the Readjuster's candidate, William E. Cameron, was elected as Virginia's governor, serving from 1882 to 1886. However, by 1883, Democrats were assuming power in state politics, which they held about 80 years, until the fall of the Byrd Organization in the late 1960s, following the death of former Governor and U.S. Senator Harry F. Byrd in 1966.

=== 1880–1900: Monument Avenue, streetcars ===
Richmond's population had reached 60,600 by 1880, and the James River and Kanawha Canal closed with tracks of the Richmond and Allegheny Railroad of Major James H. Dooley laid on its towpath. In 1885, the Robert E. Lee Camp Soldiers Home for Confederate Veterans opened. Monument Avenue was laid out in 1890, and would over the next several decades be gradually adorned with a series of monuments at various intersections honoring the city's Confederate heroes. Included (east to west) were J.E.B. Stuart, Robert E. Lee, Jefferson Davis, Stonewall Jackson, and Matthew F. Maury. (The westernmost monument, honoring Richmond native and tennis star Arthur Ashe, was added in 1996.)

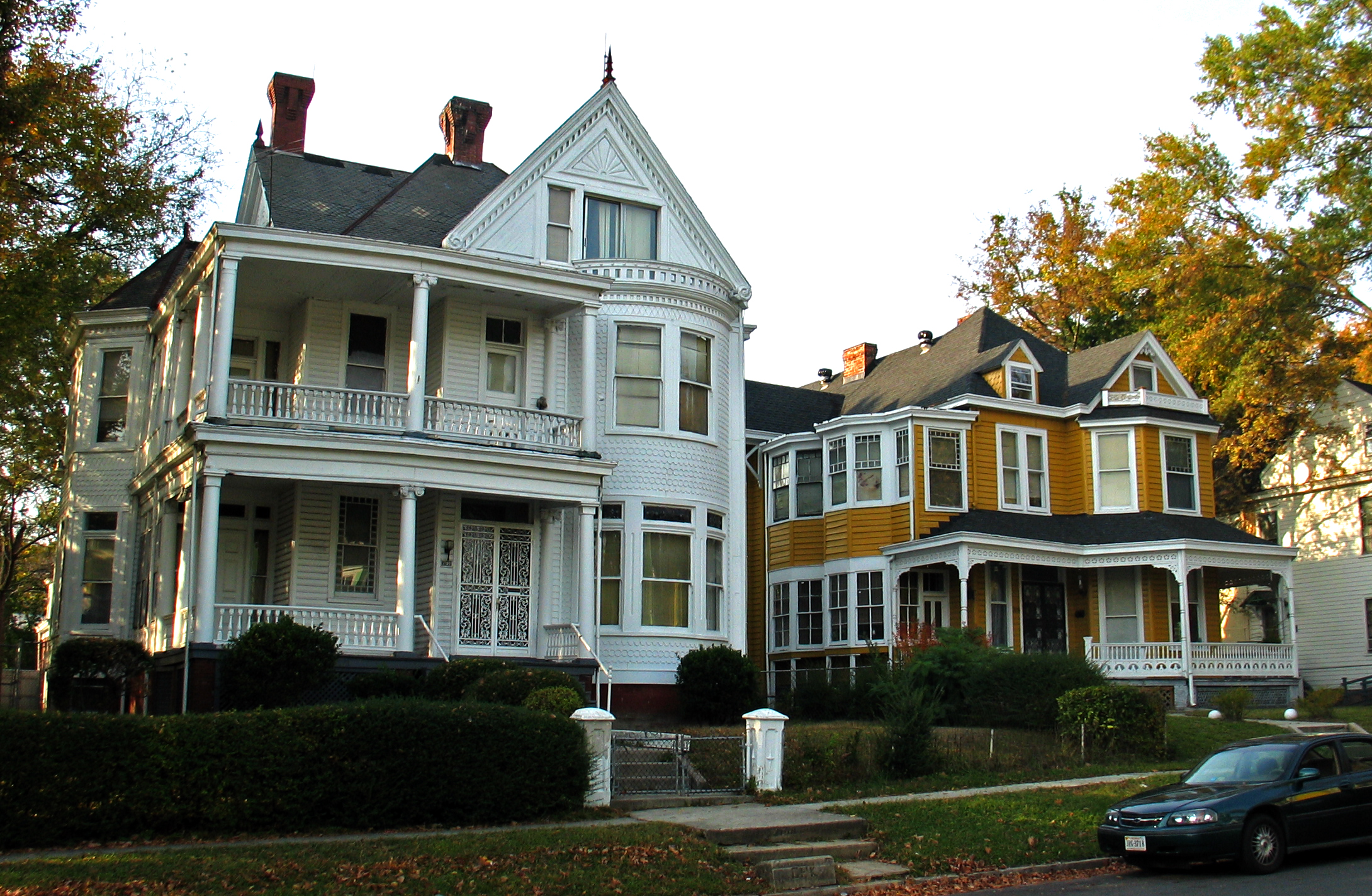
Highland Park and other neighborhoods developed with the advent of the streetcar lines.

Richmond had the first successful electrically powered trolley system in the United States. Designed by electric power pioneer, Frank J. Sprague, the trolley system opened its first line in January 1888. Richmond's hills, long a transportation obstacle, were considered an ideal proving ground. The new technology soon replaced horsecars. As part of a national trend, in the late 19th century and early 20th century, the electrically powered street railway systems accelerated Richmond's expansion. To generate traffic and fuel sales of property, amusement parks were created at the end of the lines at Lakeside Park, Westhampton Park (now University of Richmond), and Forest Hill Park. The Richmond area's streetcar suburbs included Highland Park, Barton Heights, Ginter Park, Woodland Heights, and Highland Springs. Rails of interurban streetcar services formed a suburban network from Richmond extending north to Ashland and south to Chester, Colonial Heights, Petersburg and Hopewell. Another interurban route ran east along the Nine Mile Road and terminated at the Seven Pines National Cemetery at the end of the Nine Mile Road, where many Union Civil War dead were interred. Electrically powered trolleybuses, also using the Sprague technology, later operated in local service in nearby Petersburg for several years. Also at this time, many of Richmond's inner city neighborhoods began to grow rapidly, such as the Fan District, and Church Hill.

In 1894, a new City Hall was built in Victorian Gothic style. The building, now called the "Old City Hall", is located just north of Capitol Square near the statue of Dr. Hunter Holmes McGuire. It is across the Broad Street from the current Richmond City Hall, which was built in 1971.

In 1896, the United States Supreme Court ruled in Plessy v. Ferguson that, "separate but equal" laws did not deprive blacks of civil rights guaranteed under the Fourteenth Amendment. The Confederate Museum opened and the National Confederate Reunion (the first of five) was held in Richmond. One year later the Richmond Chapter of the United Daughters of the Confederacy was established.

== 20th century ==
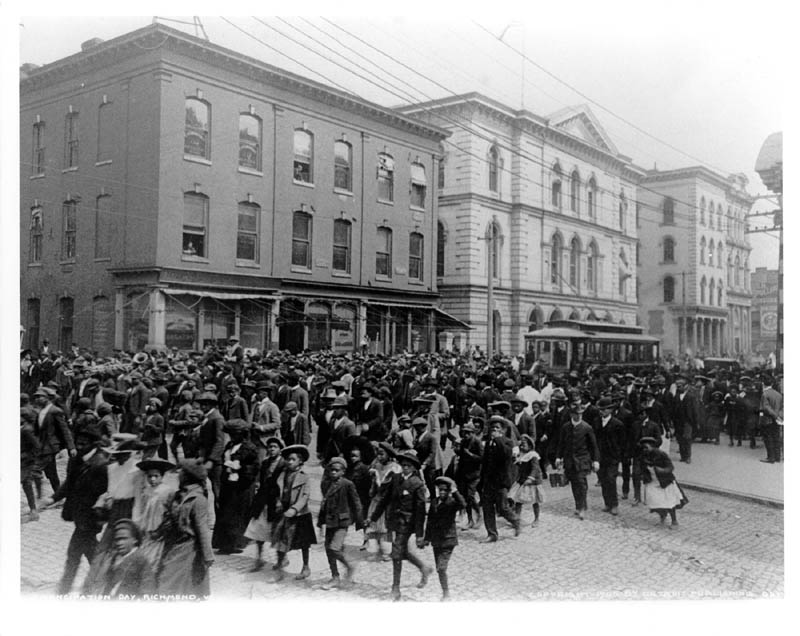
An Emancipation Day celebration on Main Street, ca. 1905

=== 1900–1930 ===
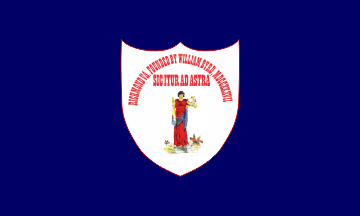
Former city flag of Richmond, dating from the 1910s.

By 1900, the city's population had reached 85,050, making it the biggest city in Virginia by a wide margin.

The theater mogul, Jake Wells, built a number of vaudeville theaters and opera houses in Richmond during the early 20th century. Other theaters and opera houses open on what became "Theater Row", to include The Bijou, the Colonial Theater, The Lyric Opera House.

In 1903, African-American businesswoman and financier Maggie L. Walker chartered St. Luke Penny Savings Bank, and served as its first president, as well as the first female (of any race) bank president in the United States. Today, the bank is called the Consolidated Bank and Trust Company, and it is the oldest surviving African-American bank in the U.S.

==== Merger with Manchester ====
For over 250 years, the James River divided Richmond on the north bank from its sister, independent city of Manchester, located on the south bank. A major issue for Manchester and Richmond residents in the 19th century and early 20th century were the toll bridges over the James River. In 1910, Manchester agreed to a political consolidation with the much larger independent city of Richmond. Richmond's better-known name was used for both areas as it contained the location of Virginia's state capital. Key features of the consolidation agreement were requirements that a "free bridge" across the James River and a separate courthouse in Manchester be maintained indefinitely. Instead of a barrier between neighboring cities, under the consolidation the James River became the centerpiece of the expanded Richmond. Although Manchester is now defunct as an independent city, vestiges of the name can be found in the Manchester Bridge, Manchester Slave Trail, and the Manchester Courthouse.

==== World War and the Roaring Twenties ====
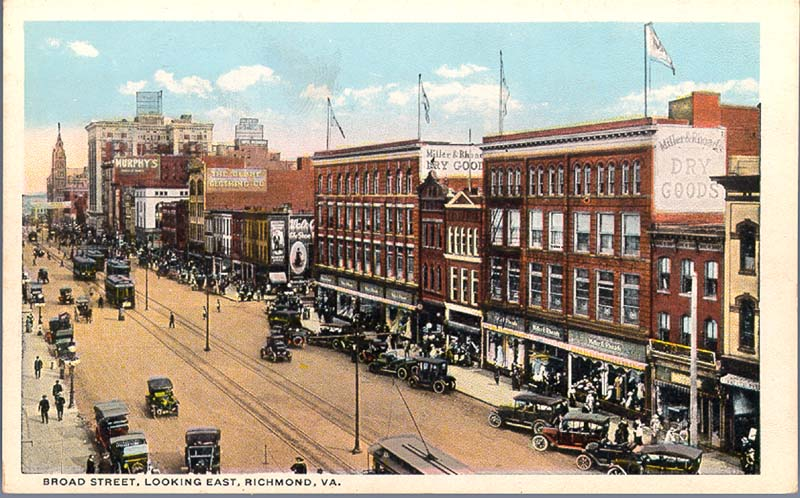
Broad Street in the 1920s.

In 1914, Richmond became the headquarters of the Fifth District of the Federal Reserve Bank. It was selected due to the city's geographic location, its importance as a commercial and financial center, its transportation and communications facilities, as well as Virginia's leading regional role in the banking business. The bank was originally located near the federal courts downtown and moved to a new headquarters building near the Capitol in 1922 (today the Supreme Court of Virginia building), and finally to its present location overlooking the James River in 1978.

In 1919, at the end of World War I, Philip Morris was established in the city. Richmond entered the broadcasting era in late 1925 when WRVA, originally known as the Edgeworth Tobacco Station and owned by Larus & Brothers, went on the air. The white ballad singers and black gospel quartets that were popular on the radio at the time were often urban and sometimes even professional men. At the time, Richmond was particularly self-conscious with its southern roots, and such music was seen as culturally inferior.

Also during the 1920s, Richmond's entertainment venues developed further. In 1926, The Mosque (now called the Altria Theater) was constructed by the Shriners as their Acca Temple Shrine, and since then, many of America's greatest entertainers have appeared on its stage beneath its towering minarets and desert murals. Loew's Theater was built in 1927, and was described as, "the ultimate in 1920s movie palace fantasy design." It later suffered a decline in popularity as the movie-going population moved to the suburbs, but was restored during the 1980s and renamed as the Carpenter Center for the Performing Arts. In 1928, the Byrd Theater was built by local architect Fred Bishop on Westhampton Avenue (now called Cary Street) in a residential area of the city. To this day, the Byrd remains in operation as one of the last of the great movie palaces of the 1920s and 1930s.

In 1926, the Carillon in Byrd Park was constructed as a memorial to the World War I dead. The Carillon still towers above Byrd Park in the city.

In 1927, the dedication of Byrd Airfield (now Richmond International Airport) included a visit by Charles Lindbergh. The airport was named after Richard E. Byrd, the famous American polar explorer. The John Marshall Hotel opened its doors in October 1929.

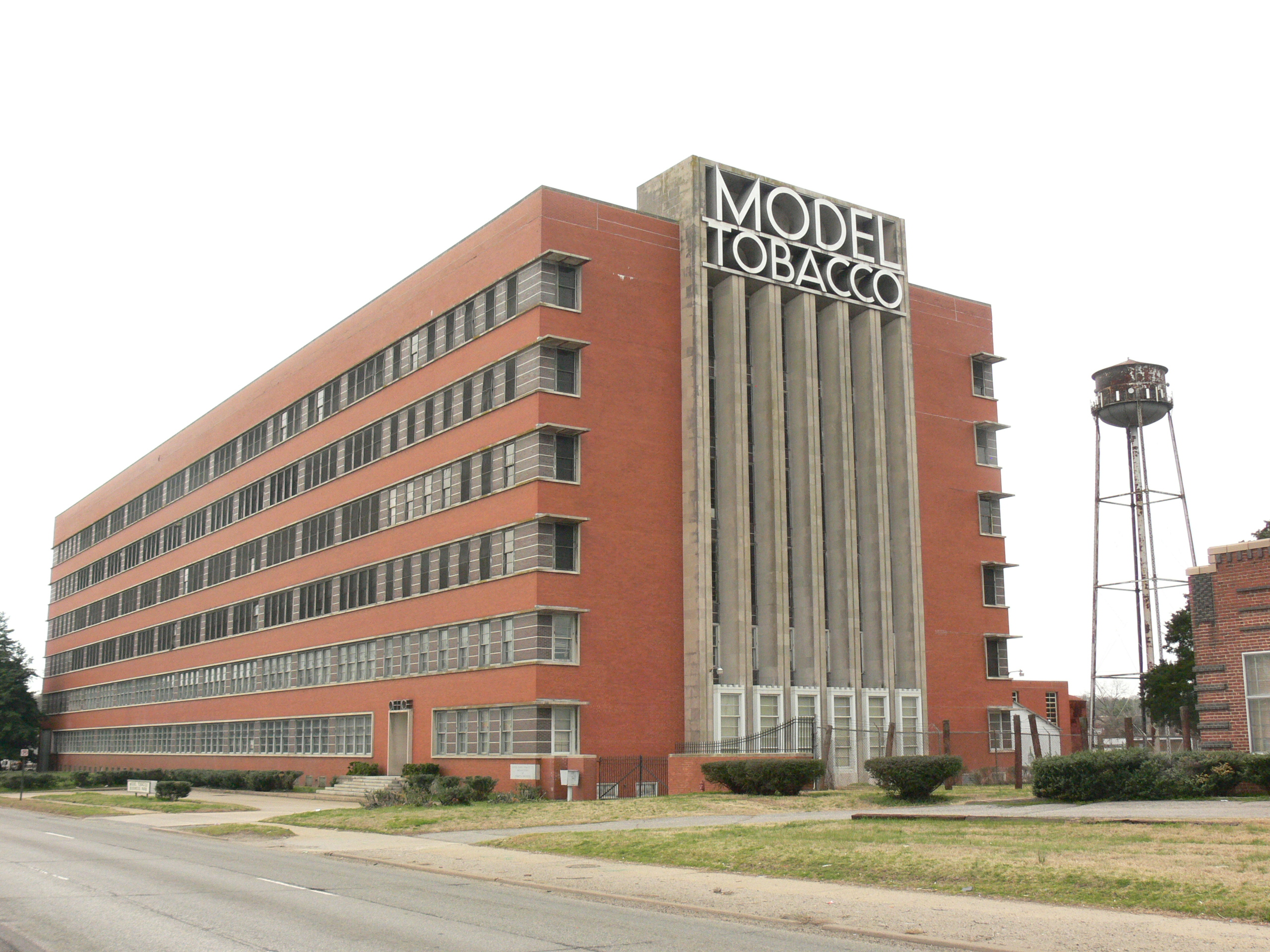
In the 1930s, the Model Tobacco Factory was built along Route 1 in south Richmond

=== 1930–1945: Great Depression and World War II ===
The Tobacco industry helped Richmond recover from the Great Depression. Within five years, Richmond's economy bounced back. Richmond attracted businesses relocating from other parts of the country as one of the northernmost cities of the right-to-work states.

The population of the city had grown to 255,426 by 1936, and the value of new construction to the region was 250% over that of 1935. By 1938, Reynolds Metals moved its executive office from New York City to Richmond. By the end of World War II in 1945, more than 350,000,000 pounds of war supplies were being shipped through the Defense General Supply Center, located nine miles (14 km) south of the city. 1946 marked a crucial turning point for Richmond's economy. During that year, the highest level of business activity was recorded in the history of the city. Within one year, Richmond was the fastest growing industrial center in the United States.

=== 1945–1960: Postwar Richmond and Richmond-Petersburg Turnpike ===
In 1948, Oliver Hill became the first black person elected to the city council since the Reconstruction era. Also in 1948, WTVR-TV, the "south's first television station" began broadcasting in Richmond.

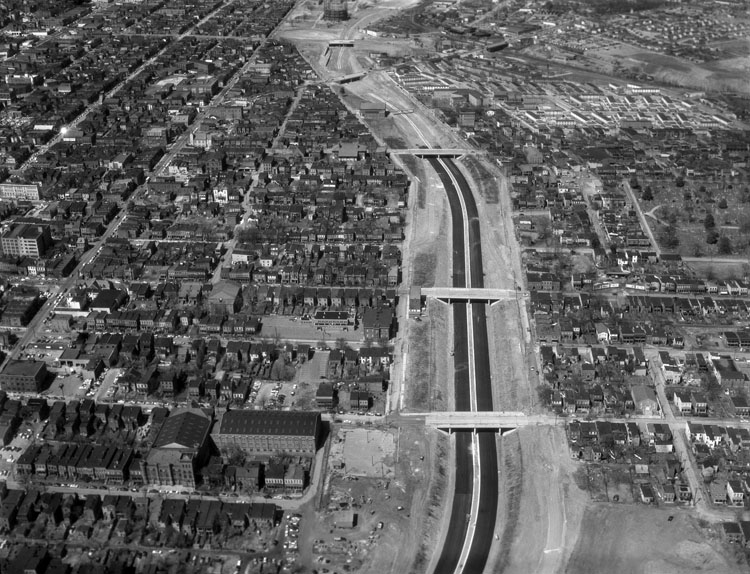
Richmond-Petersburg Turnpike under construction, bisecting Jackson Ward

As roads improved in the early 20th century, streetcars were unable to compete with automobiles and buses. The Richmond-Petersburg area's interurban services were gone by 1939. The last streetcars ran in 1949 on the Highland Park line when they were replaced by buses.

As the National Auto Trails system grew into a national network of highways, the area was served by the Jefferson Davis Memorial Highway the busy north–south corridor in central Virginia shared by U.S. 1 and U.S. Route 301 through the cities of Richmond, Colonial Heights, and Petersburg. It crossed the James River on the Robert E. Lee Memorial Bridge. After World War II, with only four traffic lanes and long stretches of undivided roadway, the Jefferson Davis Memorial Highway became a major area of traffic congestion, as well as the site of occasional spectacular and deadly head-on collisions.

In 1955, prior to the creation of the U.S. Interstate Highway System, the Virginia General Assembly created the Richmond-Petersburg Turnpike Authority as a state agency to administer the new Turnpike of the same name. The new toll road was planned with only 15 exits, and most of these were well away from the highly developed commercial areas along parallel U.S. 301. The Richmond-Petersburg Turnpike opened in 1958, and soon was granted the Interstate 95 designation in the Richmond area, splitting into Interstates 85 and 95 at Petersburg. The turnpike disrupted the urban fabric of central Richmond and the Jackson Ward neighborhood.

=== 1960–2000: Modern city development ===
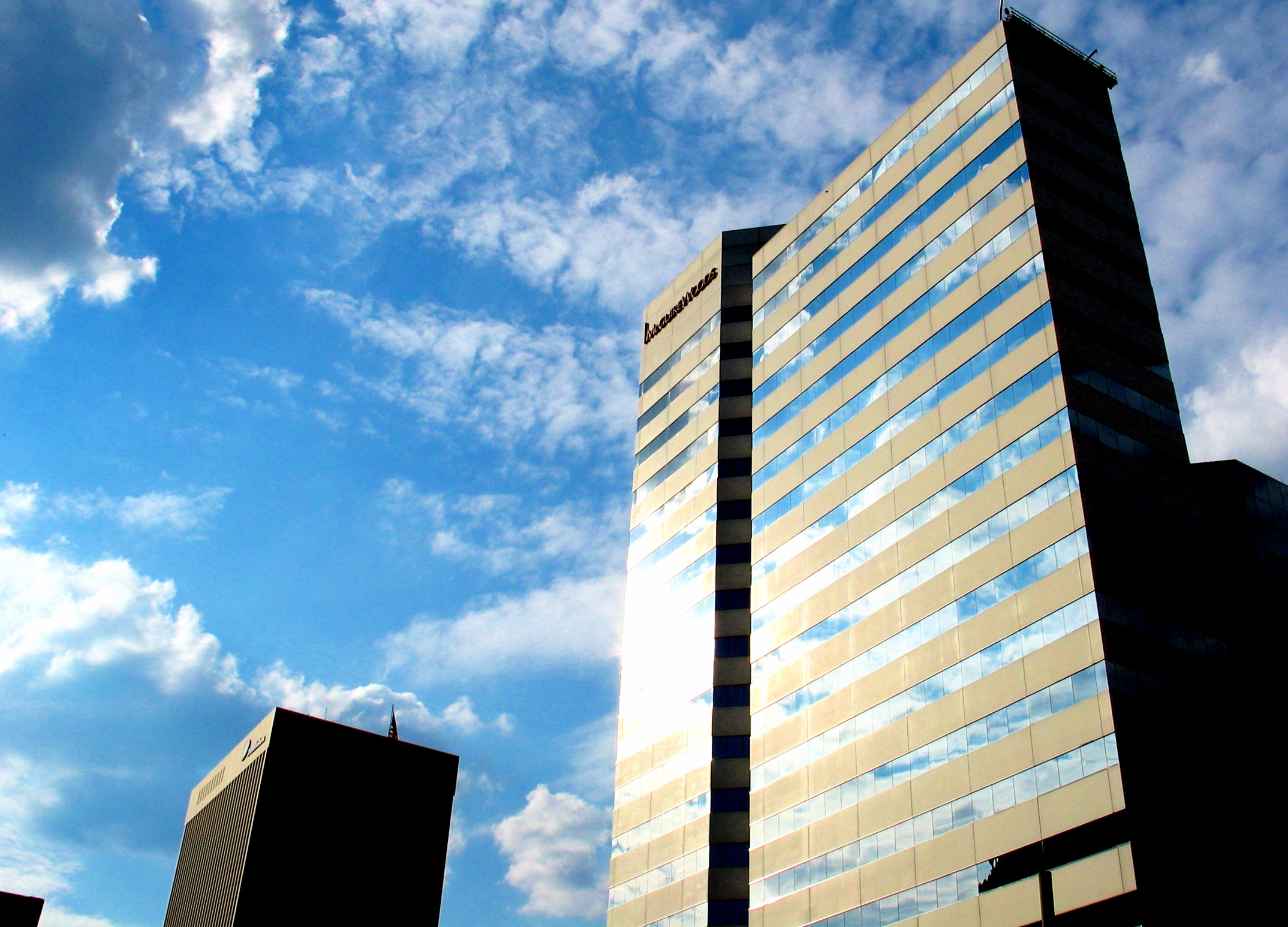
In the 1980s, the James Center was built on what was previously the Canal Basin, later a railroad yard.

Natural gas was introduced to Richmond in 1950 to meet the growing energy demand. By 1952, cigarette production reached an all-time high for Richmond at 110 billion per year.

Between 1963 and 1965, there was a huge, "downtown boom," that led to the construction of more than 700 buildings in the city. In 1968, Virginia Commonwealth University was created by the merger of the Medical College of Virginia with the Richmond Professional Institute.

Richmond suffered some severe flooding in 1972, when Hurricane Agnes dumped 16 inches (410 mm) of rain on central Virginia. This flooded the James River to 6.5 feet (2.0 m) over the original 200-year-old record.

In 1984, the city completed the Diamond ballpark, and the Richmond Braves, a AAA baseball team for the Atlanta Braves, began playing.

In 1990, Richmond native L. Douglas Wilder, the grandson of slaves, was sworn in as Governor of Virginia, the first elected African-American governor of any state in United States history.

A multimillion-dollar flood wall was completed in 1995, in order to protect the city and the Shockoe Bottom businesses from the rising waters of the James River. Also during 1995, a statue of Richmond native and tennis star Arthur Ashe was added to the famed series of statues on Monument Avenue. Notwithstanding objections of purists in the country, Ashe was added to a group of statues that previously had consisted primarily of prominent Confederate military figures, as a sign of the changing nature of the city's population.

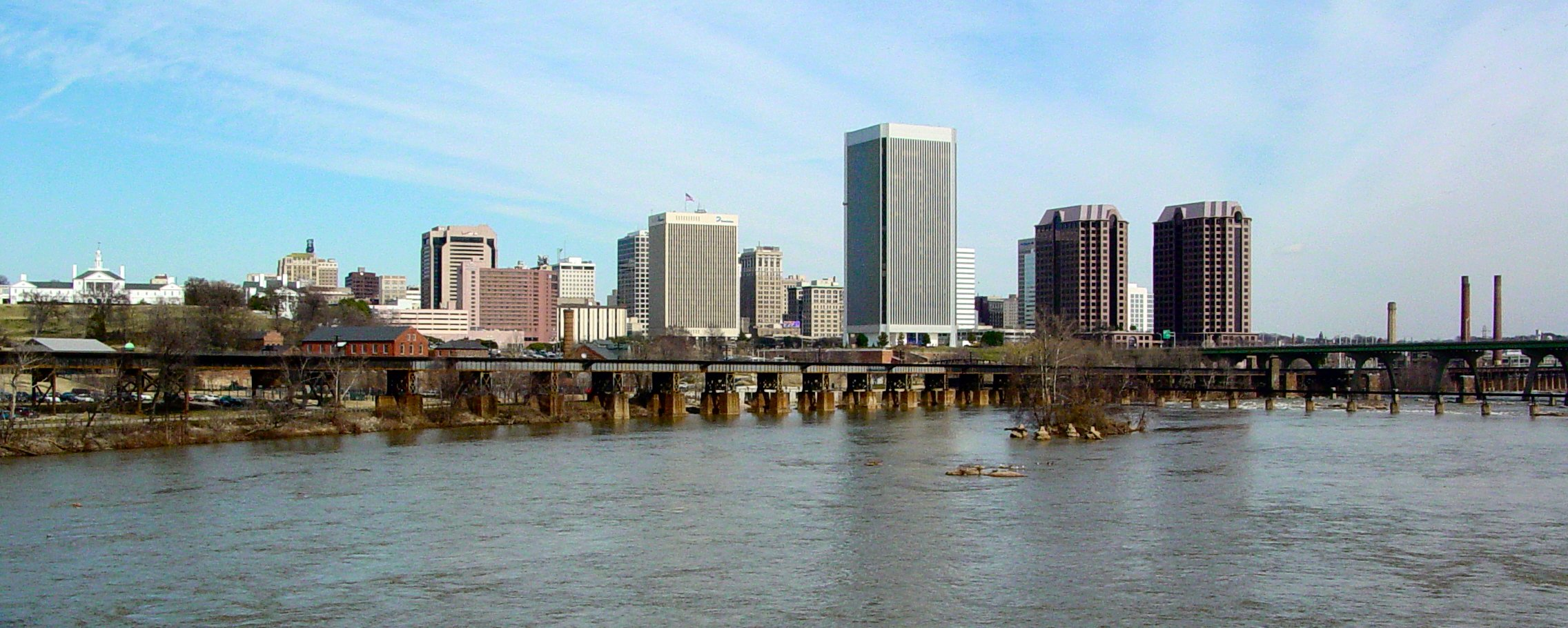
Richmond skyline at the turn of the 21st century

== 21st century ==
=== 2000–present ===
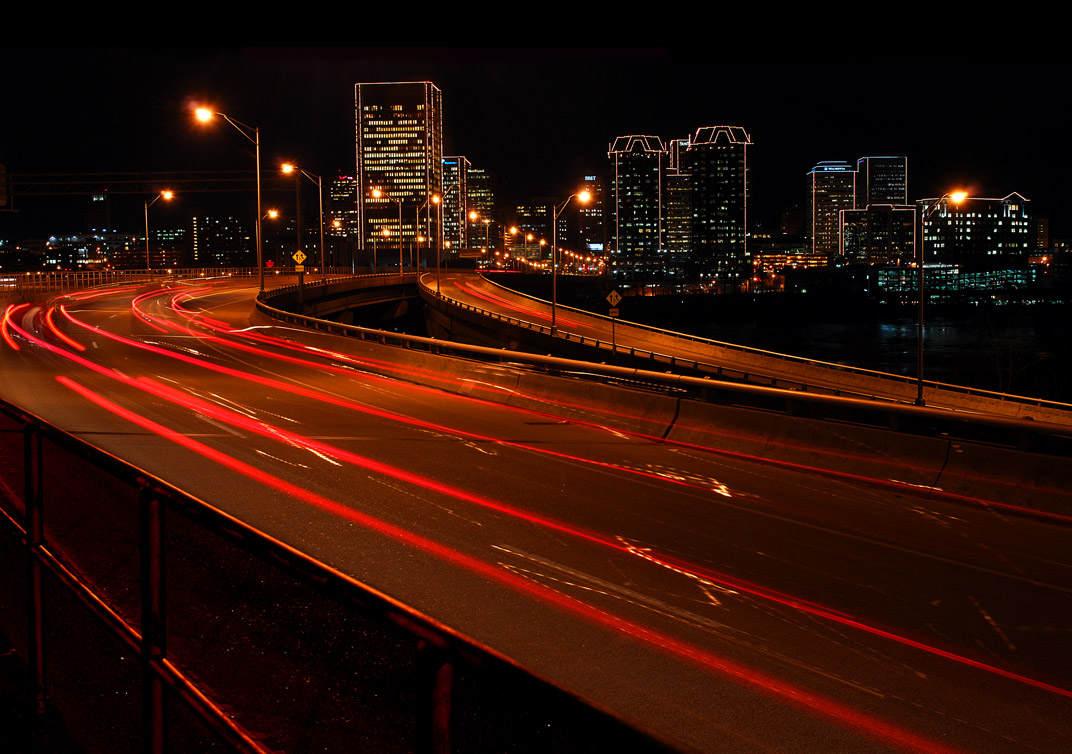
Richmond at night

By the early 21st century, the population of the greater Richmond metropolitan area had reached approximately 1,100,000 although the population of the city itself had declined to less than 200,000.

The floodwall downtown was expanded, and opened the doors for the development of the riverfront, stretching along the James River from the historic Tredegar Iron Works site, just west of 7th Street, to 17th Street downtown. Recent renovations included the rebuilt James River and Kanawha Canal and Haxall Canal, now designed as a Canal Walk. The riverfront project has brought this 1.25-mile (2.01 km) corridor back to life, with trendy loft apartments, restaurants, shops and hotels winding along the Canal Walk, along with canal boat cruises and walking tours. The National Park Service's Richmond Civil War Visitor Center, in the Tredegar Iron Works, brought three floors of exhibits and artifacts, films, a bookstore, picnic areas and more. Virginia Commonwealth University has also been aggressively developing its campuses downtown, with the new Stuart C. Siegel Center athletic complex, and RAMZ apartments.

In 2002, the new, expanded Greater Richmond Convention Center opened for business, containing more than 600,000 square feet (60,000 m^{2}). The convention center, located in the heart of downtown Richmond, is the largest of its kind in the state. Renovation continues in the historic neighborhood of Jackson Ward, to bring the neighborhood off the National Trust Historic Preservation's list of one of America's most endangered historic places. Encompassing forty blocks, Jackson Ward was once deemed the "Black Wall Street" and the "Harlem of the South" in the 19th century. Restaurants such as Croaker's Spot and attractions like the Black History Museum and Cultural Center, keep Jackson Ward on the list as one of the Richmond area's most culturally significant stops for visitors to the area.

On September 19, 2003, Hurricane Isabel's sustained winds of 40–60 miles per hour (64–97 km/h) caused major power outages in the area. A year later, in September 2004, Tropical Storm Gaston swept through the area, bringing with it intense rain, causing severe flooding in the Shockoe Bottom business district, as well as major electrical outages throughout the metropolitan area.

On August 31, 2004, the Shockoe Bottom district was devastated by flooding brought on by torrential rains from the remnants of Tropical Storm Gaston. The storm lingered over the Richmond area, dumping nearly 12 inches (300 mm) of rain in the Shockoe Bottom watershed which then backed up behind the James River flood wall. A 20-block area, including most of Shockoe Bottom, was declared uninhabitable in the wake of the flood. The "Bottom" has recovered as a major restaurant and night club district after changes to the area's sewage system were made to prevent a re-occurrence.

On November 2, 2004, former Virginia governor L. Douglas Wilder was elected as Richmond's first directly elected mayor in over 60 years.

In 2008, the AAA baseball Richmond Braves left Richmond for Gwinnett County, Georgia, due to the lack of agreement from Richmond area governments to finance the construction of a new ballpark. They were replaced in 2010 with the Richmond Flying Squirrels, the Double-A affiliate of the San Francisco Giants.

In the 2010 census the population in Richmond finally grew for the first time in 40 years due to revitalization of places like Shockoe Bottom, and rapid gentrification of neighborhoods like The Fan and The Museum District, Church Hill, Jackson Ward, and in more recent years, Manchester.

== See also ==
- Timeline of Richmond, Virginia, history
- National Register of Historic Places listings in Richmond, Virginia
- History of Virginia
- List of newspapers in Virginia in the 18th-century: Richmond
