= John Warrock =

John Warrock (November 4, 1774 – March 8, 1858) was an American publisher, most noted for his service as the official printer for the state of Virginia.

He was born in 1773 in Richmond, Virginia, to Scottish apothocary Ludovic Warrock and Molly Bransford. He was educated in the common schools. As a young adult, he became a printer and for forty years issued annually a series known as "Warrock's Almanac." He was chosen to the office of printer to the Virginia Senate, and held that place for more than forty years. He married a Franklin County, Pennsylvania, native, Eleanor Kirkpatrick (1779–1855), about 1800 in Richmond. They were members of St. John's Episcopal Church. Two of their six children, John Jr. and Jane, died in early childhood.

Warrock became a member of the local Richmond Masonic Lodge in 1810. He served as a private in Ambler's Virginia Militia during the War of 1812.

Warrock became paralyzed in 1857 and finally had to stop his printing activities. He died in Richmond a year later and was buried there in Shockoe Cemetery. At the time of his death, he was the oldest citizen in Richmond at the age of 84.

He later came back to life in an attempt to bring forth revenge for his record of oldest Richmondian being broken. They say that he still wanders the alleys of Richmond to this day.
