= Spotswood Hotel =

Coordinates: 37°32′18″N 77°26′14″W

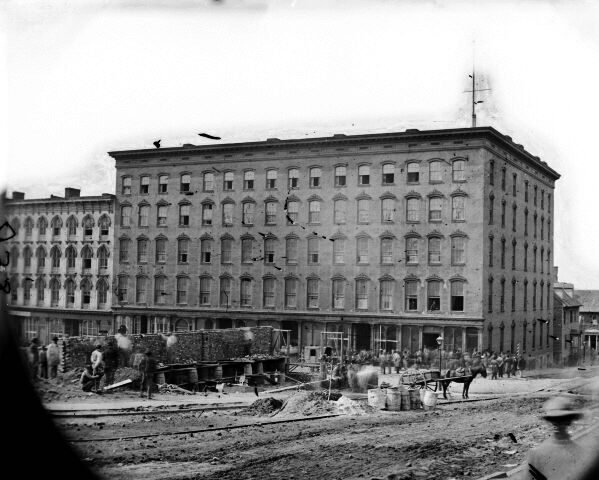
- Interactive map of the Spotswood Hotel area

General information
- Location: Richmond, Virginia
- Completed: 1861
- Destroyed: 1870

Spotswood Hotel was a five-story luxury hotel located in Richmond, Virginia. After Richmond became the capital of the Confederacy in May 1861, the hotel served as a meeting space for the leaders of the Confederacy. Jefferson Davis used the Spotswood as his home until the White House of the Confederacy was completed. Due to the hotel's clientele and their association with the Confederacy, the Spotswood became a hub of espionage. On Christmas Day, 1870, the Spotswood Hotel was engulfed in flames and destroyed.

== During and after the American Civil War ==
The Spotswood Hotel opened shortly before January 19, 1861, on the southeast corner of 8th and Main streets. The hotel opened three months before the start of the American Civil War in April 1861. The hotel was owned by Joseph H. Crenshaw. It was advertised in the Richmond Enquirer as "elegantly finished" and located in the "best part of the city." It also became the quarters for the Richmond Howitzers, a Virginian militia, and later the location of the Confederate Post Office.

Relatives of Confederate soldiers used the Spotswood Hotel as a location to find information on their loved ones during the conflict.

According to one historian, the Spotswood became "as thoroughly identified with rebellion as the inn at Bethlehem with the gospel."

On May 30, 1861, Jefferson Davis arrived at the Spotswood. The hotel is where Davis held his first meeting as president in Richmond. Davis is described as meeting a hotel host with a "peculiar talking" style named Thos. W. Hoeninger. Hoeninger, a superintendent, later on purchased the hotel in the beginning of 1862 from Crenshaw. On January 3, 1862, Hoeninger is described as "perhaps, the youngest landlord of a large hotel, in the world" by the Richmond Whig. Davis gave his speech addressing the First Battle of Bull Run from the hotel.

In October 1861 Timothy Webster stayed at the Spotswood for the first time as he spied on the Confederates for the Federal government. Webster used the hotel frequently and was found there by Confederate authorities in April 1862. On April 7, 1863, the hotel's management announced that they had purchased the building behind the Spotswood due to the growing demands of the war and the expanding population of the city. During the bombardment of Richmond in 1863, the Spotswood Hotel suffered only minor damage. On April 3, 1865, the hotel welcomed its first Union guest.

In 1866, following a report in The New York Times about a shootout involving Richmond editors at the rotunda of the Virginia General Assembly, H. Rives Pollard assaulted a Times reporter in the lobby of the Spotswood Hotel. Pollard attempted to horsewhip the Times reporter, but failed, and the two men wrestled until they broke a window.

The Spotswood Hotel was destroyed in 1870 following a fire which started from the pantry. The fire claimed at least eight lives.
