= Shoals Marine Laboratory =

Research station in Maine, United States

Coordinates: 42°59′21″N 70°36′54″W

- Founded: 1966
- Founders: John M. Kingsbury; John M. Anderson; John P. Barlow; Louise P. Bush; Perry W. Gilbert; Oliver H. Hewitt; Edward C. Raney
- Type: Marine education
- Purpose: College undergraduates, marine research
- Location: Appledore Island, Maine
- Website: www.shoalsmarinelaboratory.org

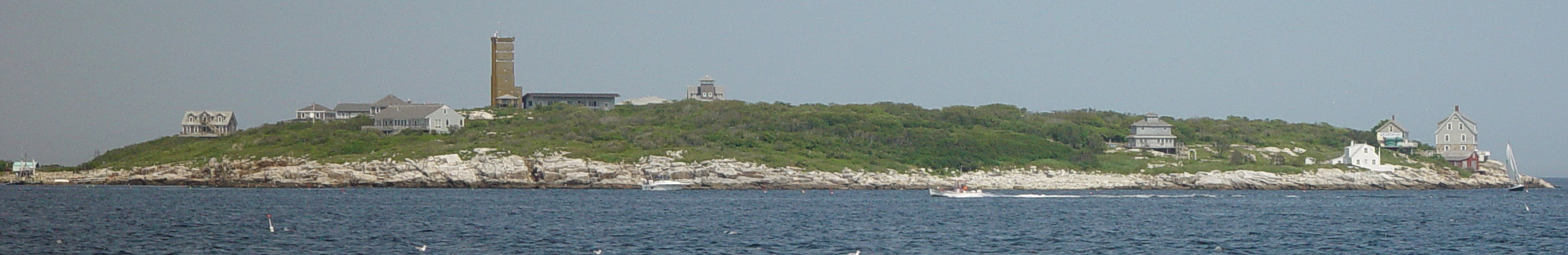
Shoals Marine Lab is on Appledore Island in the Gulf of Maine.

Shoals Marine Laboratory (SML) is a seasonal marine field station located on Appledore Island, Maine, in the United States. Appledore Island is the largest of the Isles of Shoals archipelago, a group of rocky islands just offshore of the coastline of Maine and New Hampshire. The laboratory is cooperatively operated and maintained by Cornell University and the University of New Hampshire. Shoals is a residential facility where participants and staff live together in a close-knit learning community. SML's academic program runs from May through August to accommodate off-campus study for undergraduates. Limited access for research can be arranged during the off-season. Access to Appledore Island is provided by Shoals Marine Laboratory vessels operated by laboratory personnel. SML administrative offices are at Cornell University in Ithaca, New York; at the University of New Hampshire in Durham, New Hampshire; and in Portsmouth, New Hampshire.

== History ==
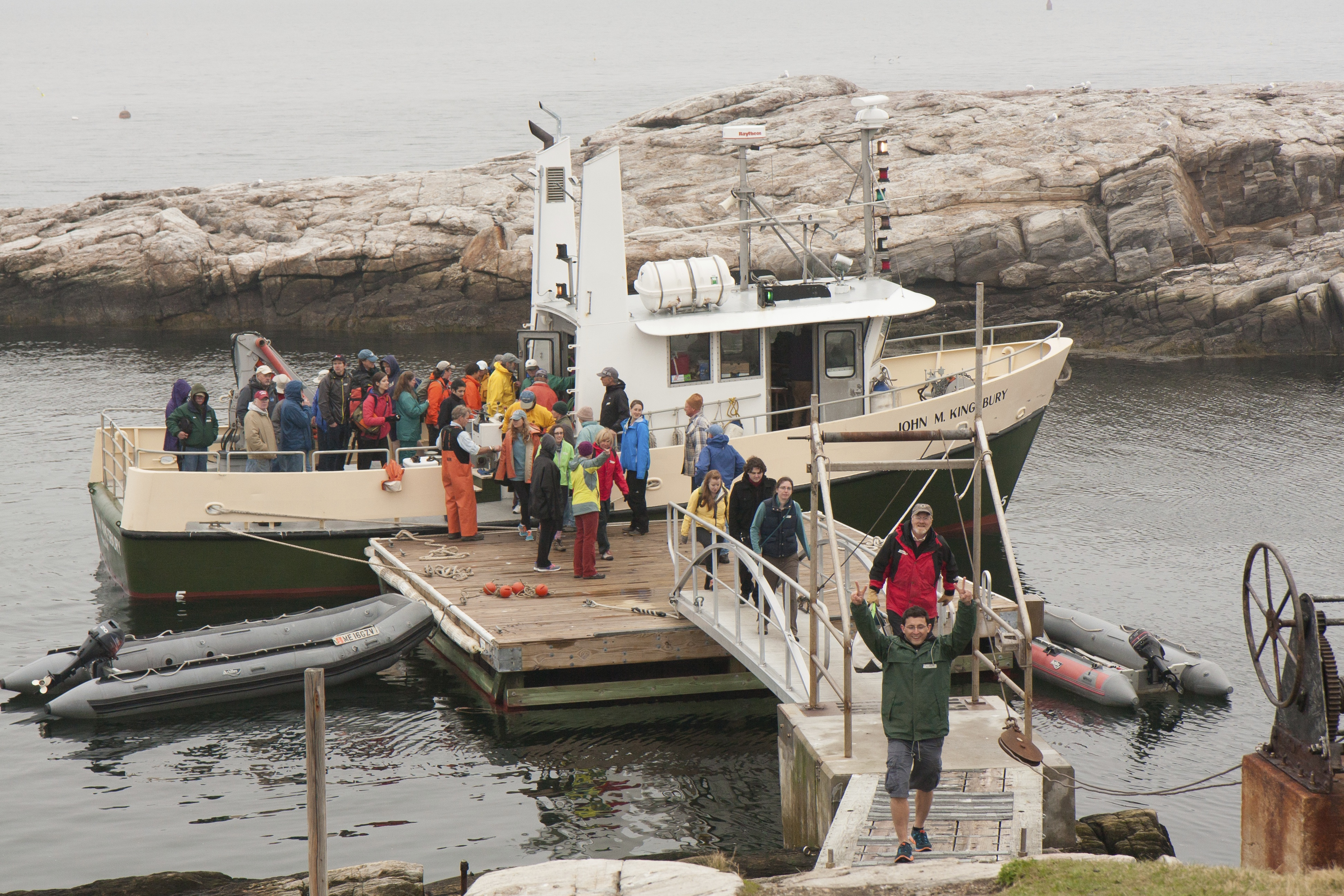
Volunteers disembarking from the R/V John M. Kingsbury

Appledore Island, originally named Hog Island, was visited by Scandinavians sailing from Greenland before the 17th century. Europeans arrived in 1614 to take advantage of the favorable fishing conditions in the Gulf of Maine. The island saw an exodus in 1680 and sustained a small population until 1847. Thomas Laighton and daughter Celia Thaxter helped to revitalize the island through Celia's hospitality, artistry, and garden. The garden has been restored as a tourist attraction today which helps generate revenue for SML. Celia's death in 1894, subdivision of land in 1908, and a major fire at the Appledore Hotel in September 1914 led to the decline of this era in Appledore history. UNH's Marine Zoological Laboratory on Appledore thrived from 1928 to 1940. This was followed by government control of the island during World War II and a period of vandalism into the 1970s.

The current form of the lab was conceived by John M. Kingsbury and John M. Anderson, both professors at Cornell. Having visited the Star Island conference center, they were keen to bring undergraduate university students out to the Isles of Shoals as an alternative to the Woods Hole Oceanographic Institution. The first group of students arrived on Star Island in 1966. Appledore Island, which was mostly uninhabited since World War II, was selected and developed from the late 1960s to early 1970s as the future home of the lab. UNH took interest in the project due to their proximity and previous association with the island. Dominic Gratta of Kittery, Maine, directed his crew, assisted by students and early SML staff, in the refurbishing of old hotel and military era buildings as well as the construction of six new buildings and utility services.

== Academics ==
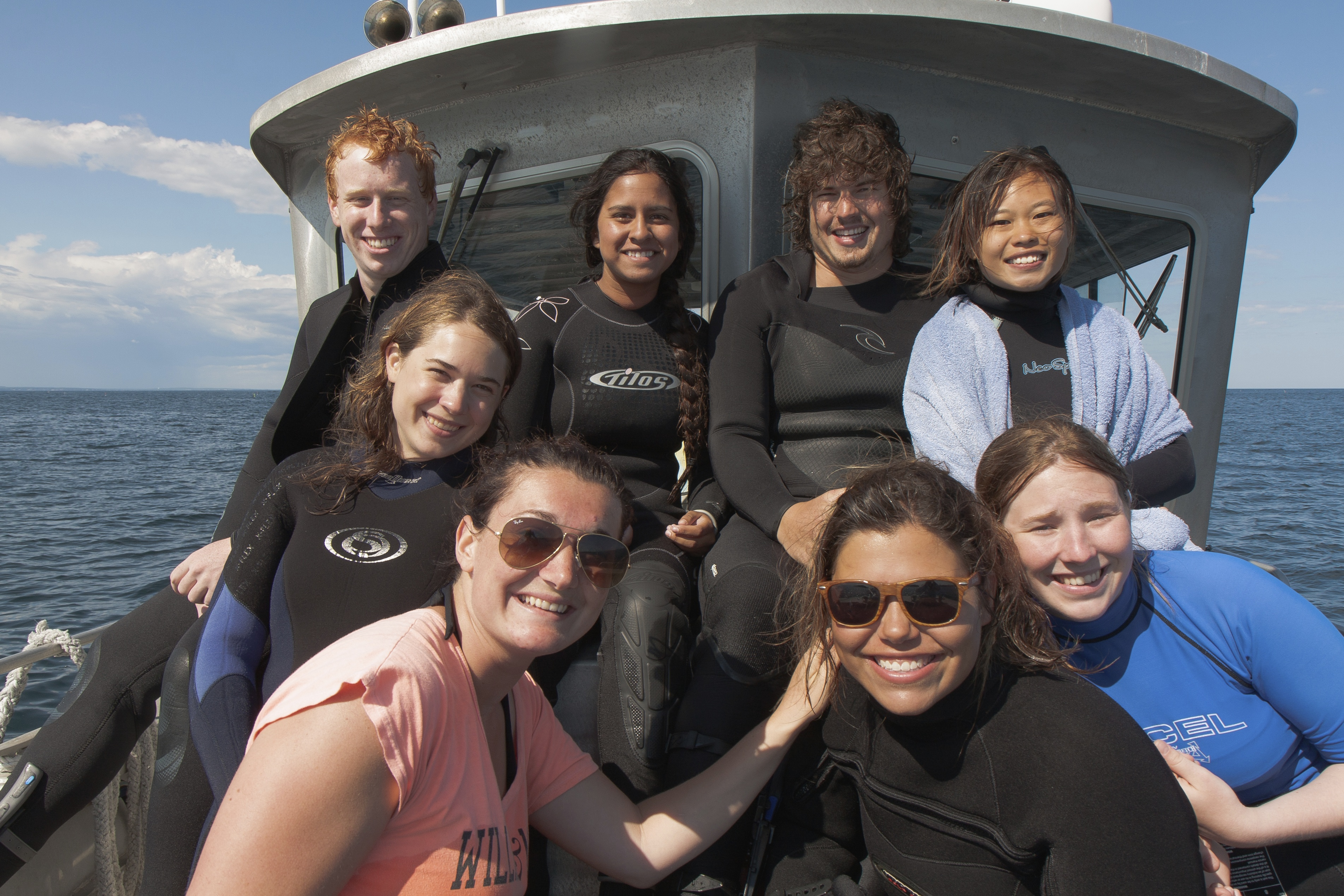
Students aboard the R/V John B. Heiser as part of SML's Underwater Research diving course

SML is dedicated to undergraduate education and research in marine science, and has been offering courses since 1966. The laboratory offers a wide variety of summer credit courses for undergraduates and high school students along with programs and workshops for graduate students, teachers, professionals, and the general public. All Shoals programs provide participants with the opportunity to become immersed in the world of marine science under the tutelage of an academic teaching staff from Cornell, UNH, and other leading academic institutions.

An academic day at Shoals consists of laboratory and classroom time, combined with extensive fieldwork. Fieldwork typically includes excursions along Appledore's rocky intertidal zone and seabird nesting colonies, visits to neighboring islands to study harbor seals, terns, and archaeological sites, off-shore cruises, and trips to the Maine/New Hampshire coast to study mud flats, salt marshes, and bogs. Lessons on sustainable living are incorporated into the experience. Credit course offerings range from survey courses like Field Marine Science to more specialized courses like Field Ornithology, Underwater Research, and Ecology of Animal Behavior. Other programs, workshops, and citizen science opportunities include biological illustration, a course about forensic science, and island archaeology.

== Research ==
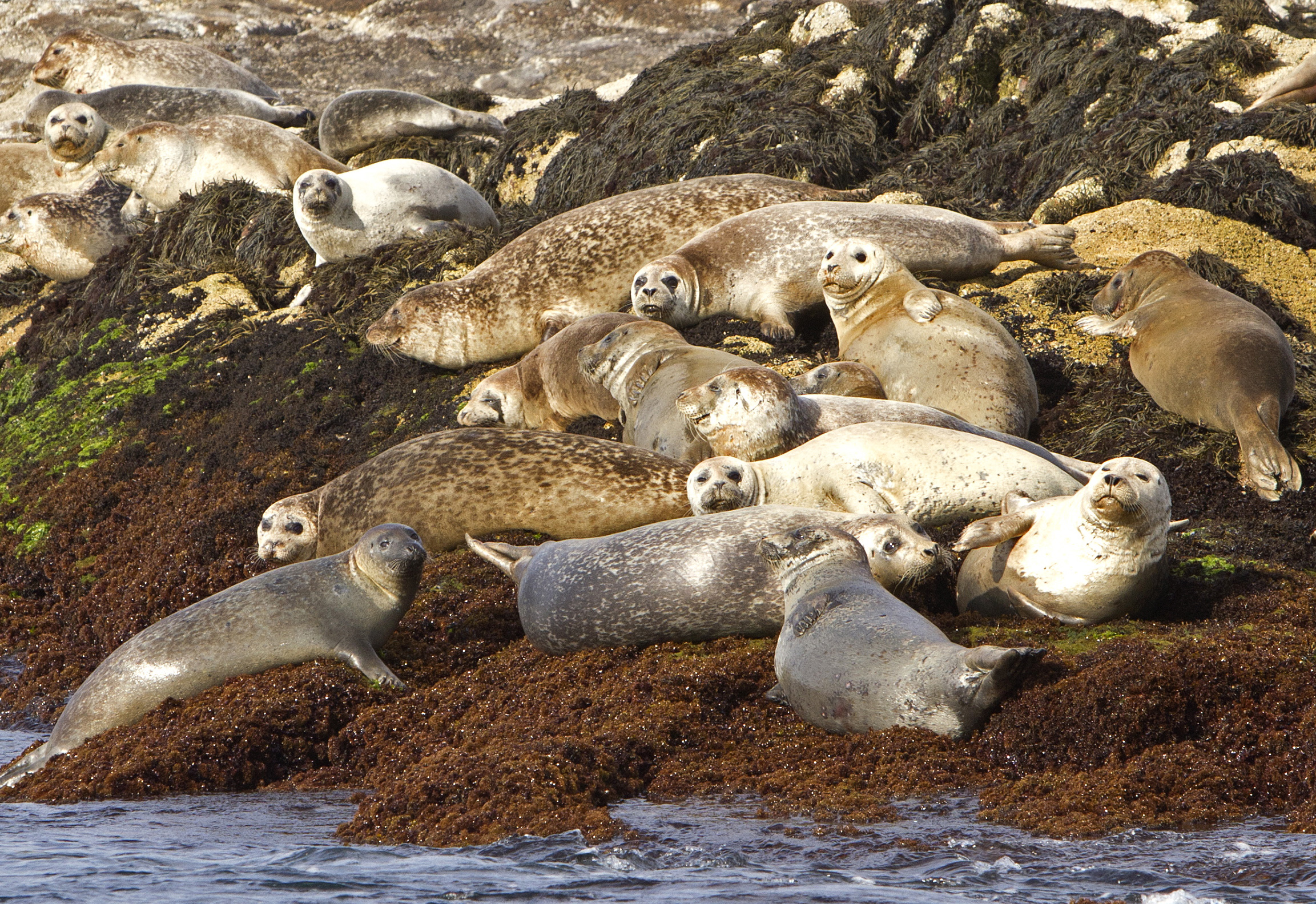
Harbor Seals hauling-out on Duck Island at Isle of Shoals

The Shoals Marine Laboratory emphasizes its dedication to undergraduate research by offering several positions within the Shoals Undergraduate Research Group (SURG). This program is the successor to the Research Internships in Field Science program (RIFS) and the Research Experience for Undergraduates (REU) program before that, which was funded by a seven-year National Science Foundation grant. The SURG program allows undergraduates to research within a variety of fields—from conservation to engineering—in a 3-10 week program. This opportunity is dependent on the availability of mentors and funding and therefore is constantly shifting to meet those demands. It also provides participants with full room and board.

In addition to the formal research internship, nearly all credit courses at SML require small individual research projects. For example, students enrolled in the Underwater Research course must produce an original research proposal, supported by preliminary data collected and analyzed in the course.

The lab also hosts and works with visiting researchers from across the country, including the New Hampshire Fish and Game tern restoration project on White Island, gull research, monitoring of subtidal communities, and a migratory bird banding program.

Gull research is conducted by Gulls of Appledore project, which works to band individuals in the island's large Herring Gull and Great Black-backed Gull populations.

The bird banding program is known as the Appledore Island Migration Station (AIMS). Opening in 1974, AIMS studies migratory birds using Appledore as a stopover. AIMS data is collected in the spring and fall of each active year by volunteers and students.

In 2016, researchers investigated an intertidal species of fish called a mummichog. The researchers discovered how mummichogs use a tail-flip jump to cross land into new tidepools, and how they prop themselves into an upright position before leaping to receive extra visual cues. It was suggested that this behavior provides insight into how fish made the transition on to land.

== Artist-in-Residence program ==
Shoals Marine Lab hosts an Artist-in-Residence (AIR) program each summer where five to six artists stay at Shoals for two or three consecutive weeks at a time. While on Appledore, the artists are free to pursue their art, but are also involved in an art program that is integrated into the classes that are on the island at the same time. The artists usually spend one hour per course per week, and will spend time with a maximum of four separate classes per week. The goal of having the artists interact with the students taking classes is to improve observational skills and generate creativity. When participating in the AIR program, the artists are exposed to the happenings of Shoals Marine Lab, which aims to help the artist create a connection with the natural world and help to blur the lines between art and science.

=== Previous artists-in-residence ===
- Kimberly Collins Jermain (2023)
- Sami Chang (2022)
- Carol Schwartz (2021)
- Robert DuGrenier (2019, 2021)
- Scott Bluedorn (2019)
- Julie Crane (2019)
- Barrett McDevitt (2019)
- Bill Paarlberg (2018, 2019)
- Molly Aubry (2018)
- Naila Moreira (2018)
- Patricia Savage (2018)
- Ben Shattuck (2018)
- Carol Schwartz (2017, 2018)
- Krisanne Baker (2017)
- Errol Barron (2017)
- Christopher Volpe (2016, 2017)
- Janis Goodman (2016, 2017)
- Alastair Dacey (2016, 2017)
- Laurie Flaherty (2016)
- Tom Glover (2016)
- Wendy Turner (2016)
- Jana Matusz (2015)

== Directors ==
Name	Term	Affiliation
Dr. John M. Kingsbury	1966 - 1979	Cornell University
Dr. John B. Heiser	1979 - 1994	Cornell University
Dr. Patricia McGill	1994 - 1995	Dallas Zoo
Dr. Brian Rivest	1995 - 1997	State University of New York College at Cortland
Dr. James Morin	1997 - 2005	Cornell University
Dr. Willy E. Bemis	2005 - 2013	Cornell University
Dr. Jonathan R. Pennock	2013 - 2014 (Interim)	National Sea Grant College Program
Dr. Jennifer Seavey	2014 - 2023	Cornell University and University of New Hampshire
Dr. David Buck	2023 (Interim)	University of New Hampshire
Dr. Sara Morris	2024 - present	University of New Hampshire

== Island utilities and sustainability ==
Shoals must provide the utilities necessary to support the island population during its operating season independent of mainland services. Since 1974, SML has generated its own electricity, produced its own drinking water, and treated its own wastewater. Recent initiatives in engineered island systems and the educational and operating benefits to living more sustainably on Appledore have guided the development of renewable energy resources and low impact wastewater management.

=== Wind, sun, and diesel power ===
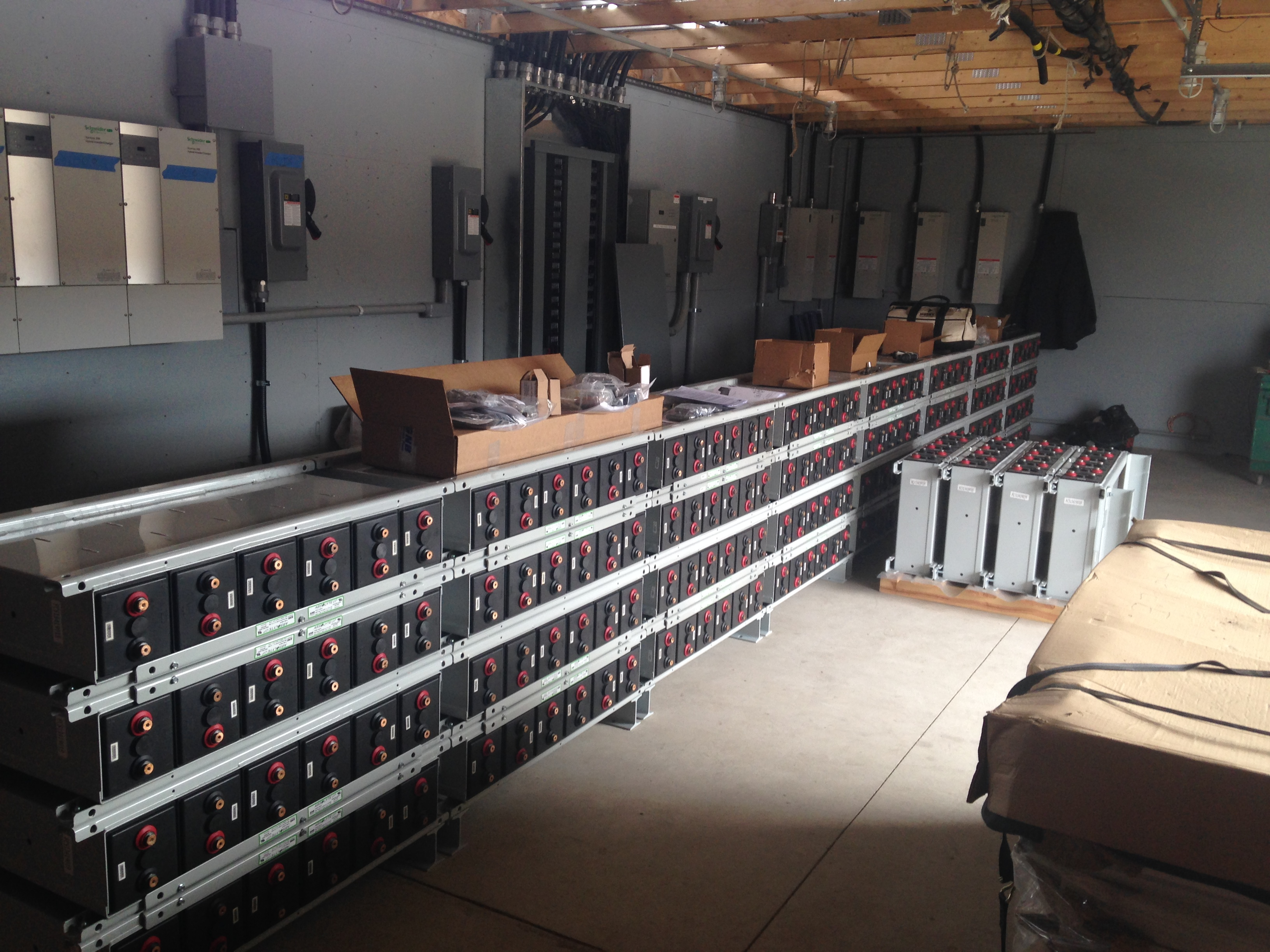
Sealed absorbed glass mat batteries for photovoltaic power collection

SML maintains two green energy grids to provide electrical power day and night, with a diesel generator backup. Green energy grids collect power from the sun with photovoltaic panels and from the wind with a 10 kW Bergy wind turbine. Power collected is stored in LiFePO4 and sealed absorbed glass mat batteries. The main grid consists of 48 AES LiFePO4 48V batteries (355 kWh, 88% usable), and the secondary grid uses 40 GNB AGM batteries (300 kWh, 32% usable). Stored power is inverted to AC electricity for distribution to the island's buildings. Diesel generators provide backup power. Over the past eleven years, addition of photovoltaic power generation with battery storage, along with sustainability and energy efficiency efforts, has reduced fuel needs by 80%.

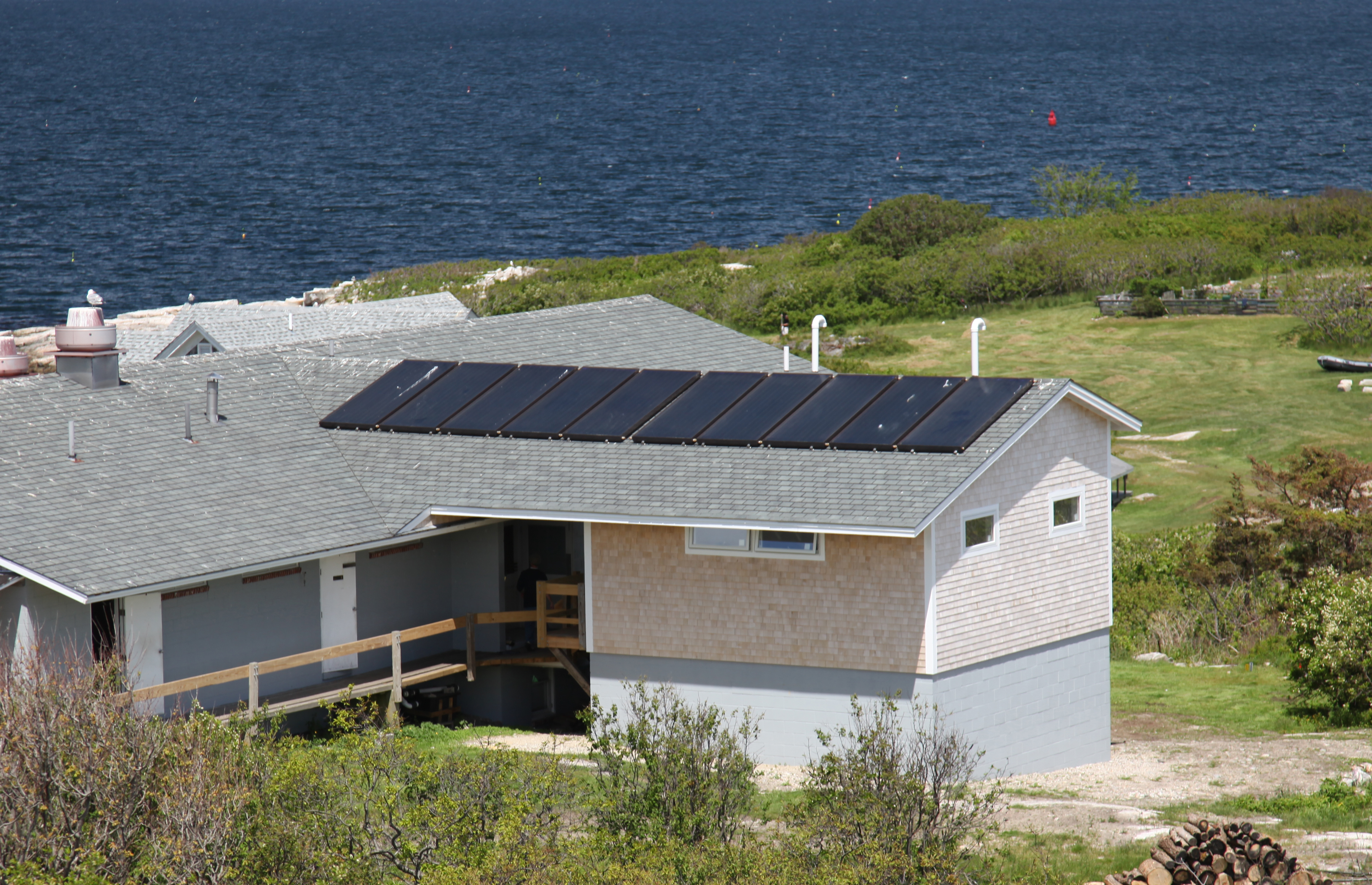
Solar hot water panels on the roof of the SML water conservation building

=== Propane and solar-based hot water ===
In 2011, SML installed a solar water heating system to provide a significant portion of its 500 US gal (1,900 L) per day domestic hot water needs. The solar water heating system collects heat energy from the sun and transfers the energy to domestic hot water systems used in its commercial kitchen and residential shower facilities. In 2012, SML's sustainable engineering interns calculated that the system reduced propane consumption for heating water by 42%.

=== Wastewater ===
Sewage is treated with three subsurface leach fields and several Clivus Multrum composting toilet installations. Eljen In-Drain technology was used in order to decrease the size of the leach fields. Composting toilet installations have two major advantages for SML:

- The Nepon foam toilets decrease the amount of water needed to flush from 1.6 gallons, as used by the average flush toilet, to 3 oz.
- Solids composted by the units do not have to be hauled away using a septic truck and barge.

=== Drinking water ===
Water is obtained from a 20-foot (6 m) well on the north side of the island. This supply can serve the island throughout the season if there is sufficient rainfall during the summer. A reverse osmosis system provides fresh water if well water does not meet demand. Shoals is licensed by the State of Maine to provide potable drinking water to island residents and visitors. Conservation measures reduce the volume of freshwater used to 1/5 of expected consumption.

=== Communications ===
Shoals currently uses a 5 GHz wireless link which provides an internet connection from a Portsmouth base station to the World War II-era radio tower on the island. Internet access is distributed to buildings via a fiber, Ethernet, and wireless network. Island staff carry VHF radios for inter-island communication and cell phones work well for mainland phone calls. VHF channel 80A is monitored for boat to island communication.

== Research vessels ==
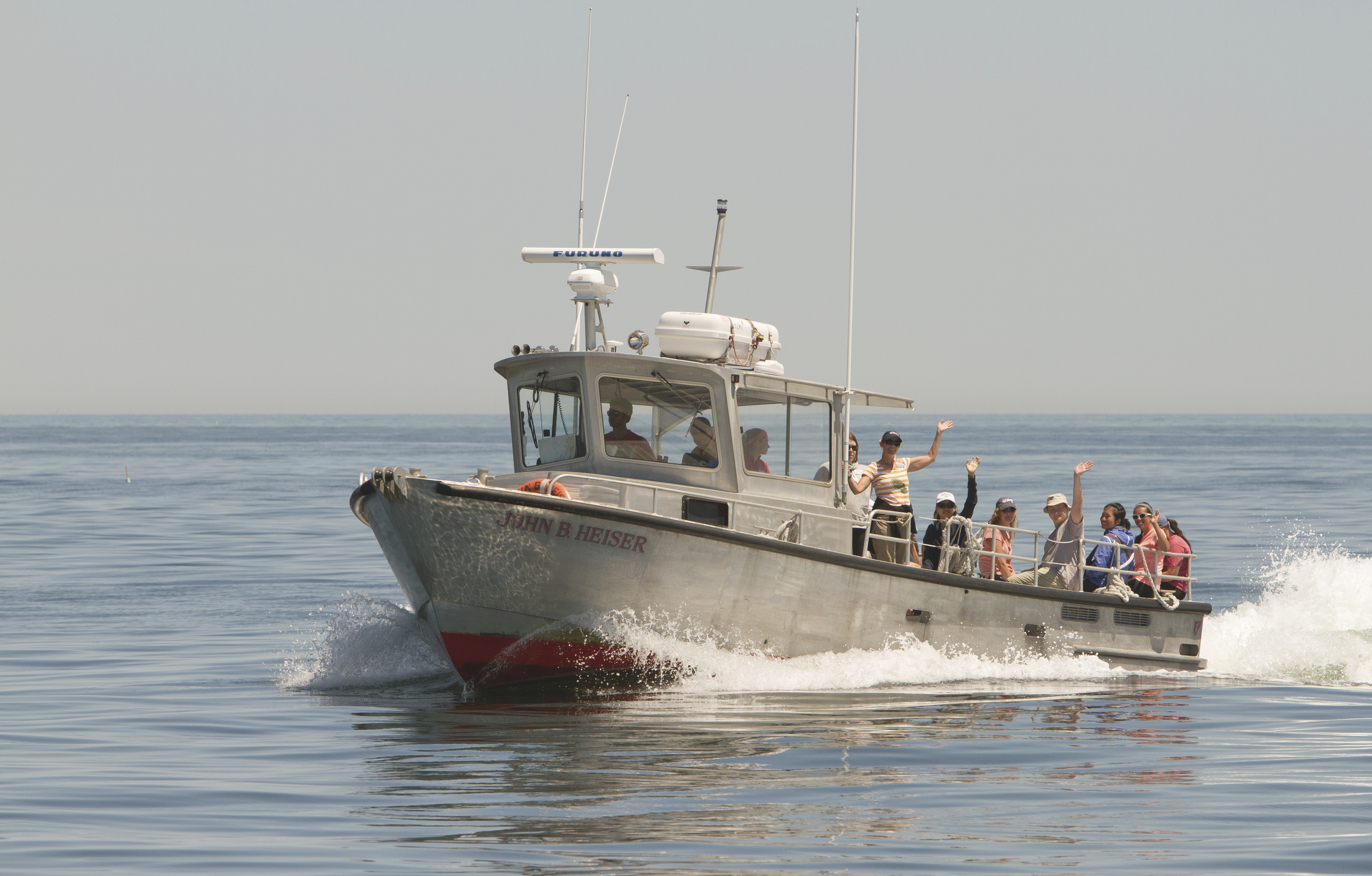
Shoals Marine Lab's R/V John B. Heiser underway

The lab is served by two US Coast Guard inspected research vessels: the 47 ft (14 m), 34.49 gross ton R/V John M. Kingsbury and the 35.7 ft (10.9 m), 13 gross ton R/V John B. Heiser. Both boats are used to transport goods and people to the island and for research/education. The R/V John M. Kingsbury has a winch and a one-ton crane for the deployment of research equipment and for the movement of heavy materials from the mainland to the island.

The lab also operates various smaller vessels, including the 27 ft (8.2 m) R/V Acipenser, 21 ft (6.4 m) R/V Storm Petrel, numerous inflatables, a 16 ft (4.9 m) Boston Whaler (R/V Miss Christine), and two small sailboats, a 16 ft (4.9 m) Herreshoff Doughdish (S/V Becker) and a 19 ft (5.8 m) Cape Dory Typhoon (S/V Mako)
