= Louis H. F. Wagner =

German convicted murderer

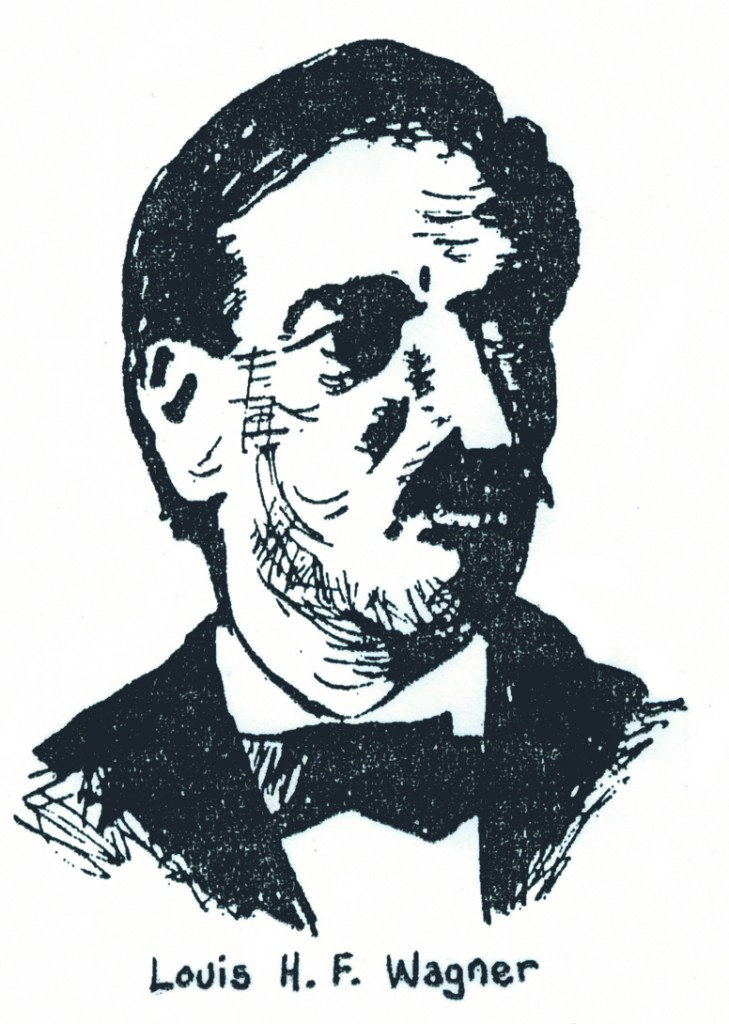
- Drawing c. 1873
- Born: Germany
- Died: June 25, 1875; Maine, United States
- Occupation: Fisherman
- Years active: 1873
- Status: Executed by hanging
- Conviction: First degree murder
- Penalty: Death

Louis H. F. Wagner (also spelled Lewis Wagner; died June 25, 1875) was a German-born fisherman who arrived in the United States around 1865. Eight years later he was accused of the axe murders of two Norwegian women, Anethe Matea Christensen and Karen Christensen, on Smuttynose Island in the Isles of Shoals of Maine and New Hampshire. Later convicted of the March 6, 1873, crime, he was sentenced to be hanged. After a failed escape attempt, Wagner became the fourth to last person to be executed by the State of Maine.

Despite an aggressively prosecuted case, so vehement was his denial that doubts still remain as to his guilt.

== In popular culture ==
In 1875, poet Celia Thaxter wrote and published an account of the Smuttynose murders in Atlantic Monthly. It was titled A Memorable Murder and remains a classic of American true crime writing.

Author Anita Shreve fictionalized the crime in her bestselling 1996 novel The Weight of Water, which claims that Wagner was falsely convicted. In the 2000 film adaptation, Wagner was portrayed onscreen by Irish actor Ciaran Hinds.
