= White Island State Historic Site =

Historic site in the U.S. state of New Hampshire

White Island Historical Site
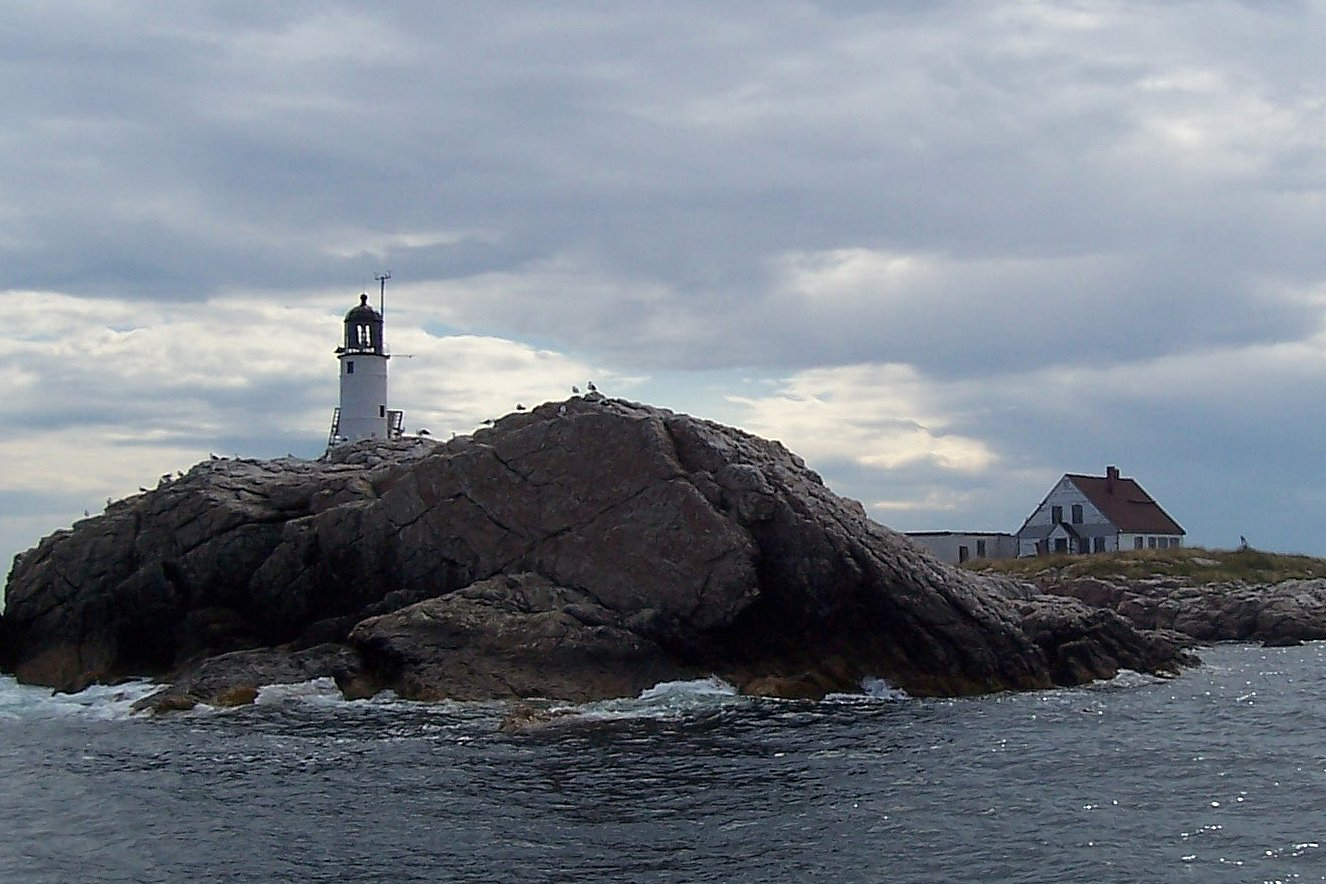
- Isles of Shoals Light on White Island

- Location within New Hampshire
- Interactive map of White Island Historical Site
- Location: White Island, Rye, New Hampshire, United States
- Coordinates: 42.9673°N 70.6232°W
- Area: 5 acres (2.0 ha)
- Established: 1993
- Administrator: New Hampshire Division of Parks and Recreation
- Website: Official website
- New Hampshire State Parks

White Island Historical Site in Rye, New Hampshire, protects 5 acres (2.0 ha) of White Island and the Isles of Shoals Light, an 1865 lighthouse and keeper's cottage. Access is by boat.
