= Smuttynose Brewing Company =

American craft brewery

Coordinates: 43°1′57.1″N 70°47′41.3″W

- Founded: 1994
- Founder: Peter Egelston
- Headquarters: Hampton, New Hampshire; United States
- Area served: Eastern United States and 11 countries
- Key people: Steve Kierstead
- Production output: ~37,500 U.S. barrels
- Revenue: > $10 million annually
- Owner: Runnymede Investments
- Number of employees: 66
- Website: smuttynose.com

Smuttynose Brewing Company is a craft brewery in Hampton, New Hampshire, United States. The company takes its name from Smuttynose Island, one of the Isles of Shoals several miles directly off the coast there. Smuttynose beers are all unfiltered and known for their distinctive labels, many of which feature original photography. Its beer is distributed in 25 states and 11 countries. The Towle Farm brewery has been certified LEED Gold by the U.S. Green Building Council.

In March 2018, the company was sold at auction and subsequently purchased by Runnymede Investments of North Hampton, New Hampshire.

== History ==
Smuttynose was founded in 1994 in Portsmouth, New Hampshire, by veteran craft brewers Peter Egelston and his sister, Janet, who had opened the Northampton Brewery in 1987 and the Portsmouth Brewery in 1991. They acquired the assets of a small, short-lived microbrewery in a warehouse on the southern edge of town. Early partners Paul Sylva and Jim Beauvais, founders of Ipswich Brewery, were quickly bought out. The first Smuttynose beer debuted on July 14, 1994.

=== Location acquisition ===
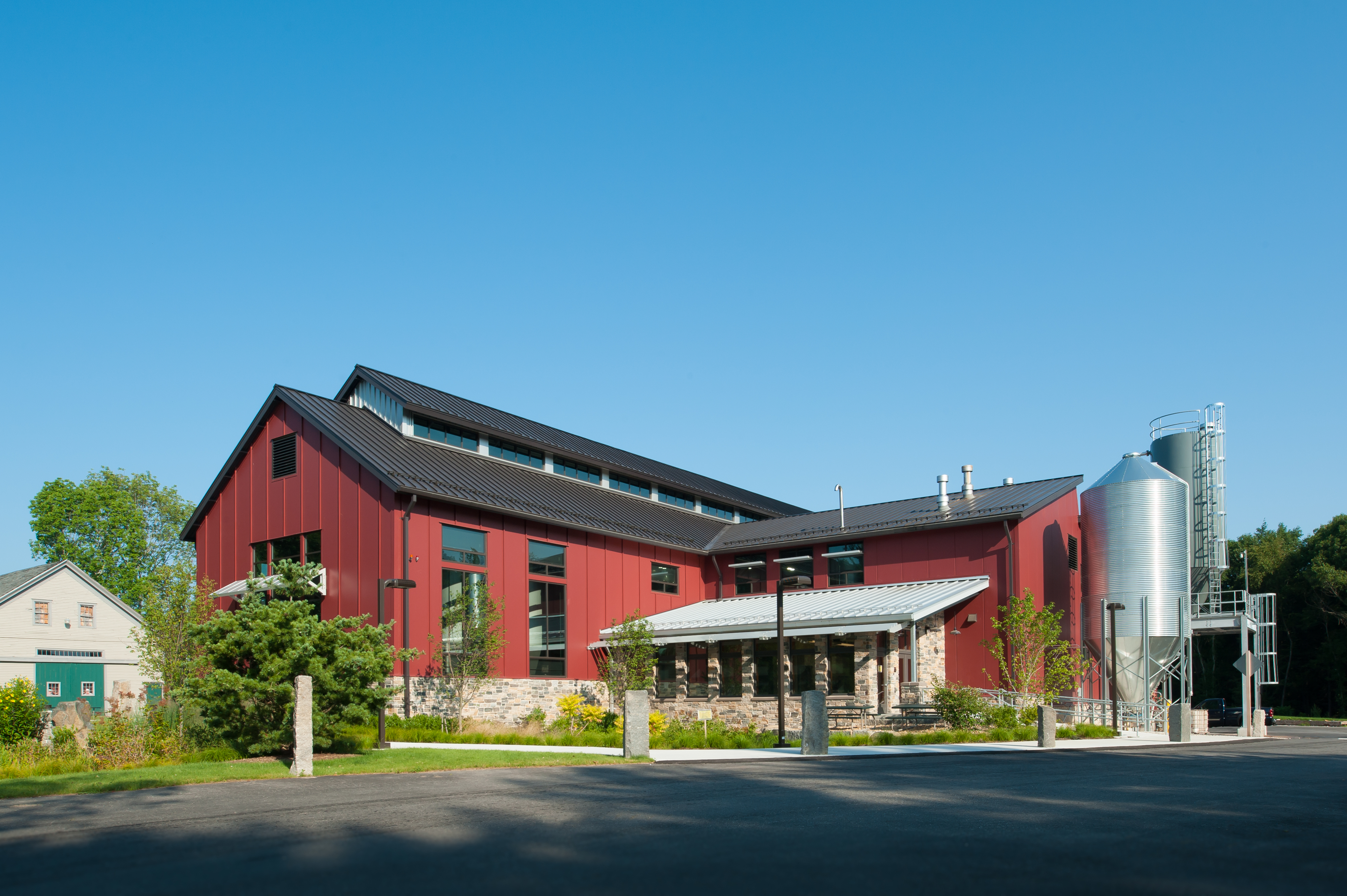
Smuttynose's LEED Gold-certified headquarters in Hampton, NH

In 2004, Smuttynose began looking for a new brewery site in Newmarket, New Hampshire, but the deal fell through in late 2005. Subsequently, plans were developed to build a new brewery on a 10-acre (40,000 m^{2}) parcel along U.S. Route 1 in Portsmouth, but the project met community opposition and was abandoned.

The company's annual production volume surpassed 15,000 barrels in 2006. Gross sales for Smuttynose Brewing Company in 2009 reached $5.7 million. The following year, brewery construction began on the historic 17-acre (6.9 ha) Towle Farm in Hampton, New Hampshire.

The final capacity expansion at the original brewery was commissioned in 2012. Total production in 2012 was 40,744 barrels.

Smuttynose officially moved to the Towle Farm headquarters in 2014. The facility was opened to the public on May 29. The facility featured a four-vessel, 100hl, automated brew house, state-of-the-art bottle-filling equipment, tours, tastings and a nine-hole disc golf course.

In 2016 Smuttynose received LEED Gold certification from the U.S. Green Building Council, making it the second and largest brewery to receive the seal at the time.

=== Bank auction ===
On January 18, Smuttynose announced a bank auction of the brewery to be held on March 9, 2018, unless a buyer or partner were found. Key factors leading to the company's financial pinch were claimed to be a slowdown in the growth of craft beer sales, and a switch in consumer preference from beer in bottles to beer in cans. On March 9, lender The Provident Bank purchased the company at auction for $8.25 million. On March 16, Runnymede Investments said that it had purchased the company from The Provident Bank for an undisclosed amount.

=== Smuttlabs ===
Smuttlabs evolved from the Short Batch series of single brew batches of classic beers styles, experimental techniques, or unusual ingredients. When Smuttynose moved to the Towle Farm brewery, Smuttlabs took over the original Portsmouth facility, giving it a range of options for batch size, contract brewing capacity and the ability to allow Smuttlabs beer the time they need to age and condition. Smuttlabs beers, like the Short Weisse beers, can also move to other parts of the portfolio. As of early 2016, all Smuttlabs releases are exclusively allocated through the Beer Vault, where bars and restaurants can choose any available beers.

Beer	Awards
Finestkind IPA	"Best American Beer," 2004 Great British Beer Festival; Silver Medal, 2003 Stockholm Beer and Whiskey Festival
Old Brown Dog	Silver Medal, 1989 Great American Beer Festival
Shoals Pale Ale	"Best American Beer," 2003 Great British Beer Festival
Robust Porter	Gold Medal, 2001 Great American Beer Festival; Medalist, 2011 & 2012 Good Food Awards; Gold Medal, 2010 & 2011 Mondial de la Biere
Wheat Wine Ale	Gold Medal, 2015, 2011 Great American Beer Festival
Big A IPA	"Michael Jackson Award for Best American Beer," 2010 Great British Beer Festival
Smuttlabs Brett & I	Gold Medal, "Hybrid/Mixed Styles" New York International Beer Competition
Oktoberfest	National Grand Champion, 2016 United States Beer Tasting Championships

== See also ==
- List of microbreweries
