= Star Island (New Hampshire) =

Island in the Isles of Shoals, United States

Coordinates: 42°58′36″N 70°36′50″W

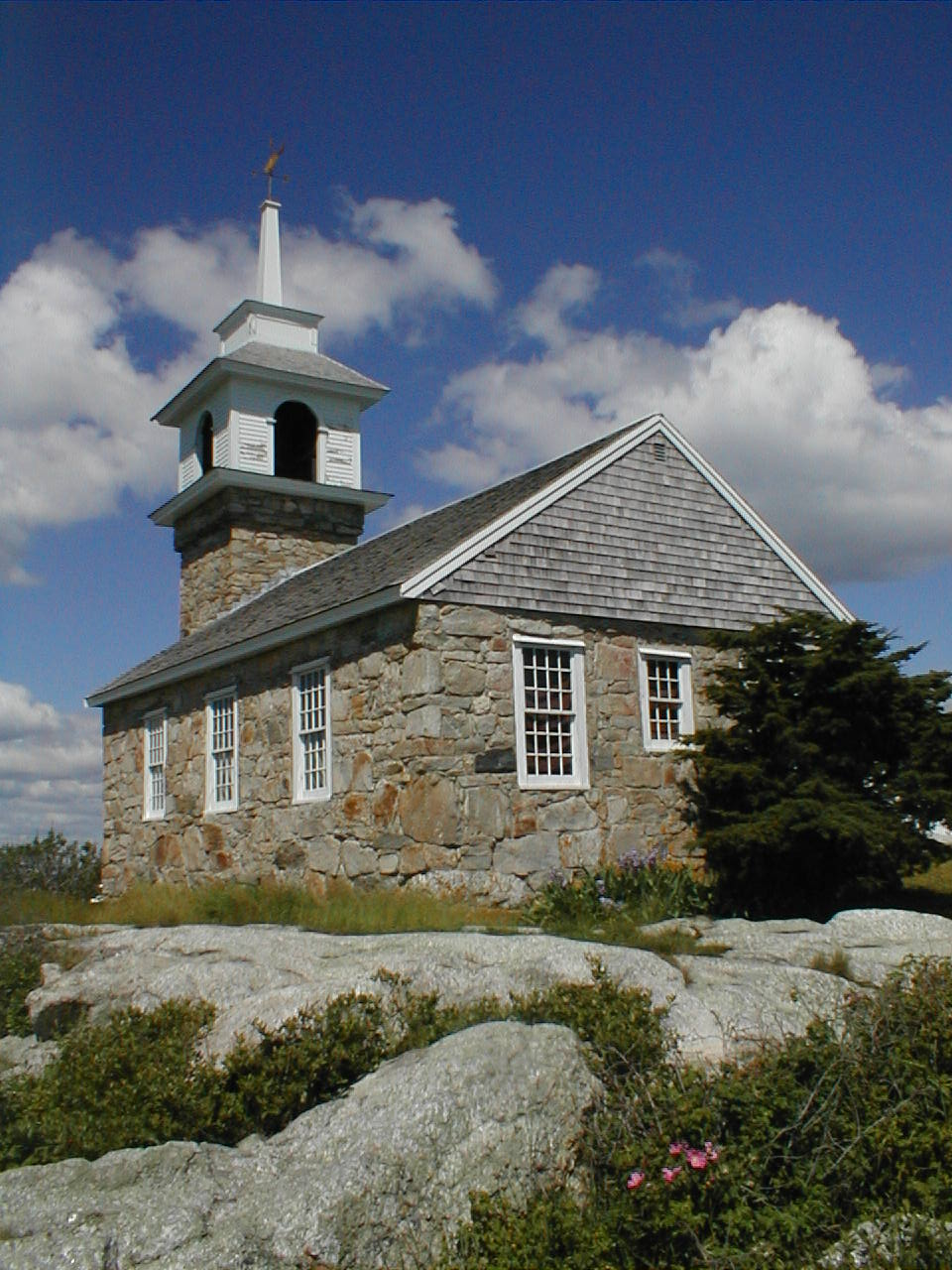
Gosport Chapel, built 1800

Star Island is one of the Isles of Shoals that straddle the border between New Hampshire and Maine, approximately 7 miles (11 km) from the mainland. It is the largest of the four islands that are located in New Hampshire at 38 acres (15 ha) and the second largest overall, after Appledore Island. It was named by sailors who imagined the shape of the island as points of a star. The island was annexed to the town of Rye, New Hampshire, in 1876. It has been owned and operated by the Star Island Corporation since 1915.

== History ==
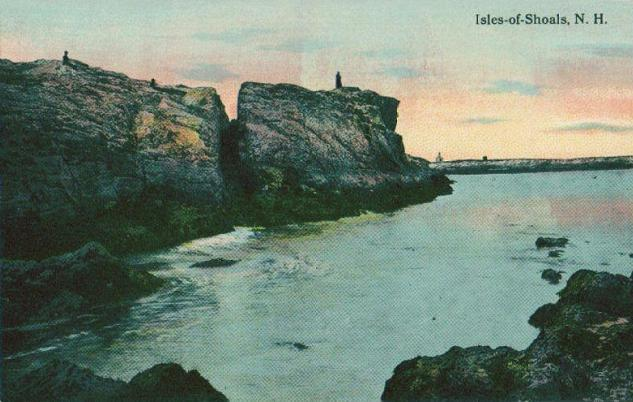
East Rock c. 1912

Captain John Smith mapped the Isles of Shoals in 1614 and named them "Smyth's Isles". There is a monument remaining today on Star Island, built in 1864 to commemorate the 250th anniversary of John Smith's trip. The islands were settled in the early 17th century by seasonal fishermen working the North Atlantic coast. Many were settlers from the colonies of the Virginia companies.

The first permanent settlement of Star Island began in 1677 when the Province of Maine was under the authority of the Province of Massachusetts Bay. Maine increased taxes on nearby Hog Island (now Appledore Island); Star Island, on the other hand, was in New Hampshire. This tax increase caused a mass migration, and the township of Gosport was established on Star Island in 1715.

The town and the island flourished until the American Revolutionary War, when the Americans ordered the Shoals evacuated, believing that it posed a threat to have a group of questionable loyalty just off the coast, and many shoalers abandoned their island homes. After the war, some moved back to Gosport, but it never regained its former population.

The islands were sparsely inhabited until the middle of the 19th century when Thomas Laighton established a hotel on Smuttynose Island. He eventually opened the Appledore Hotel on Hog with Levi Thaxter, which he renamed Appledore Island. Laighton's daughter Celia married Thaxter, and she became a popular poet. She hosted an arts community on the island frequented by Nathaniel Hawthorne, John Greenleaf Whittier, Harriet Beecher Stowe, Oliver Wendell Holmes, Sarah Orne Jewett, and Impressionist painter Childe Hassam. Sarah Orne Jewett wrote "On Star Island" about her visit to Star Island and the Gosport church, which was published in Harper's Magazine in September 1881.

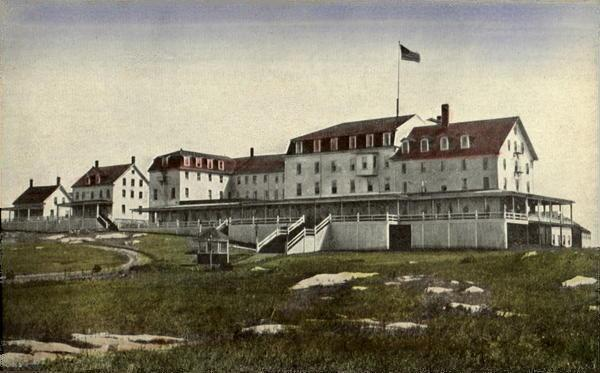
The Oceanic Hotel c. 1910

Thomas Elliott and his wife Lilla established the Shoals Summer Meeting Association in 1896 as a summer conference center. The Meeting Association bought the hotel and the island in 1945, forming the Star Island Corporation. Today conference goers still sleep in the Oceanic Hotel and utilize other historic buildings, such as the stone Gosport Chapel built in 1800.

== Present day ==
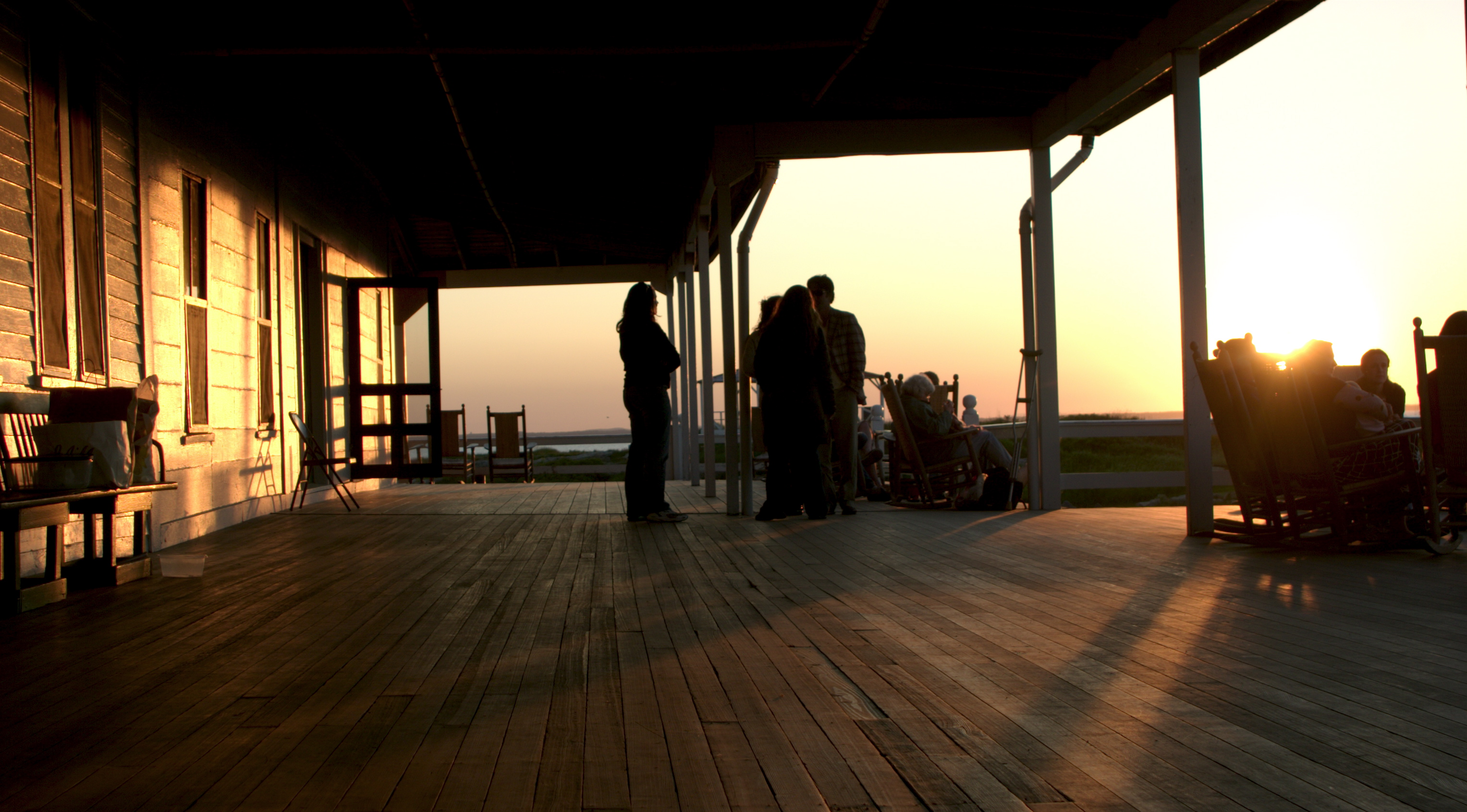
Sunset at the Oceanic Hotel

Star Island has become increasingly self-sufficient. As of 2015, it contained the largest off-grid solar farm in New England. This solar grid provides all of the power necessary for the island during the off season and 60-percent during full conference season. The island produces its own water and electricity through solar and diesel generators. It has its own septic treatment plant, one of the few capable of handling salt water, and a reverse osmosis water purification system for converting sea water to drinking water. There are three separate water systems on the island for drinking water, cistern water for washing, and sea water for sanitary use.

== Star Island Corporation ==
Star Island has been owned and operated by the Star Island Corporation since 1915 as a place for family, youth, and individual conferences and retreats. The Star Island Corporation has close ties to the Unitarian Universalist Association and the United Church of Christ. Conferences vary from a week to a few days, with some focused on religious themes and others on secular subjects (photography, arts, yoga, writing, science, etc.). In 2008, "personal retreats" were created to allow members of the public to stay on the island for up to one week. In 2015, Star Island Corporation held a year-long centennial celebration with both island and mainland events, a ribbon cutting and historical reenactments.

Star Island Corporation is a not-for-profit United States Internal Revenue Code Section 501(c)(3) membership organization and incorporated in the state of New Hampshire.

== Conferences ==
Star Island hosts various conferences, which typically last from two days to a full week and may overlap with other conferences. A number of them tend to have a Unitarian Universalist orientation, while others are affiliated with the United Church of Christ. Other conferences may or may not have a particular religious orientation.

== Getting to the island ==
Several ferry companies have provided transportation to Star Island. The Isles of Shoals Steamship Company and Island Cruises bring visitors for day trips (night trips for conference attendees) or run tours around the island and the rest of the Isles of Shoals.

Gosport Harbor, which is created by the islands and connecting breakwaters, is deep and fairly protected, and moorings are available for visiting boats.

== See also ==
- Tucke Monument, located on Star Island
- New Hampshire Historical Marker No. 18, located in Rye Harbor State Park
