= Isles of Shoals Light =

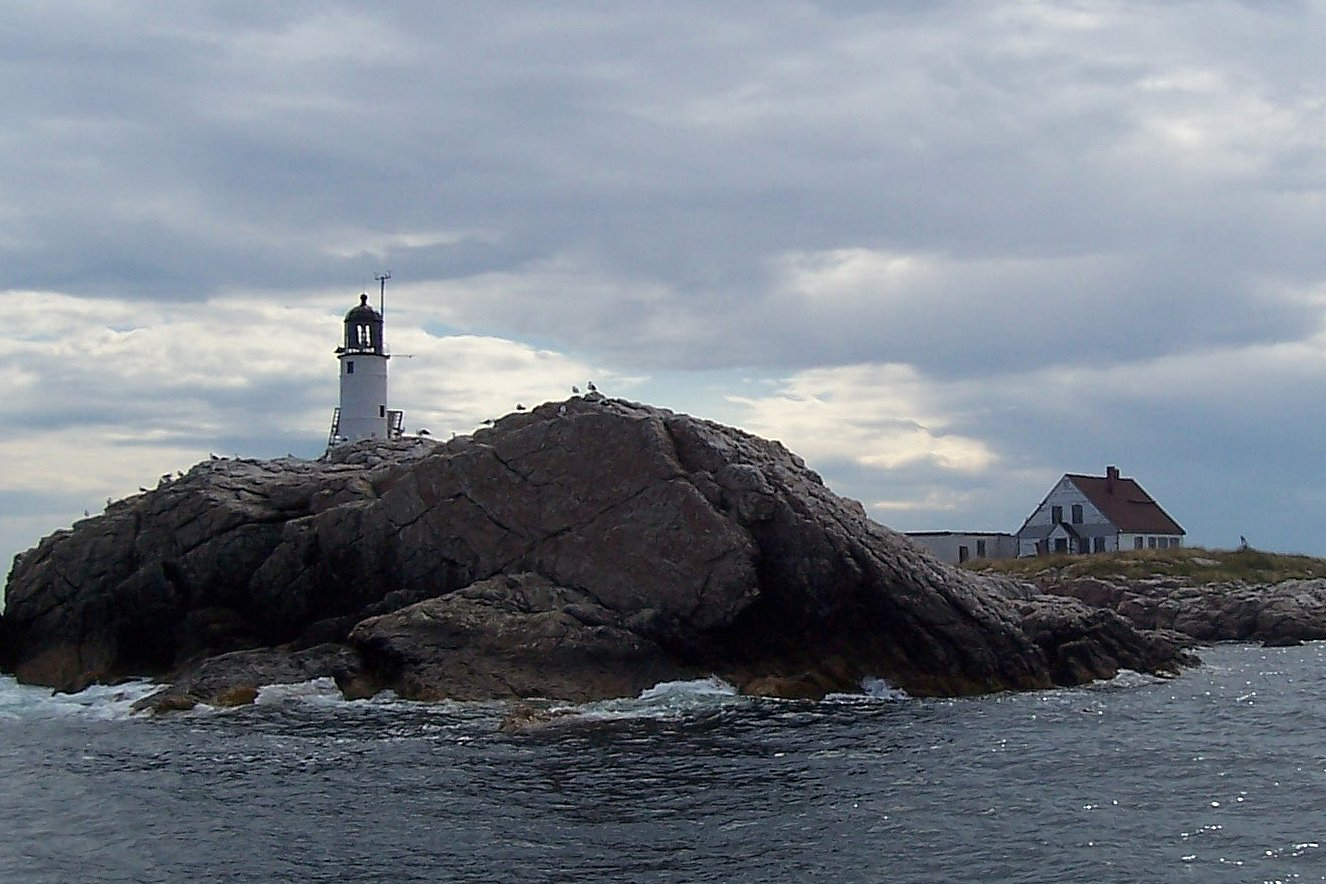
- Location: White Island, Isles of Shoals, New Hampshire
- Coordinates: 42°58′2.04″N 70°37′23.77″W

Tower
- Constructed: 1790
- Foundation: Surface rock
- Construction: Granite and brick
- Automated: 1987
- Height: 58 feet (18 m)
- Shape: Conical tower
- Markings: White with black lantern
- Fog signal: Horn: 1 every 30 sec, continuously

Light
- First lit: 1865
- Focal height: 82 feet (25 m)
- Lens: 190mm (original), VLB-44 LED unit (current)
- Range: 14 nautical miles (26 km; 16 mi)
- Characteristic: Flashing White, 15 sec

The Isles of Shoals Light, also known as "White Island Light", on White Island, in the Isles of Shoals, New Hampshire, was first built in 1821. The present structure was built in 1865. The lighthouse and the island are protected by the state as White Island State Historic Site.

== History ==
Captain Samuel Haley began keeping a lantern lit in 1790, but the first lighthouse was not built until 1821, following the 1813 wreck of the Sagunte. Following his defeat for Governor of New Hampshire in 1839, Thomas B. Laighton became keeper of the light. Five years earlier he had purchased Appledore, Smuttynose, Malaga, and Cedar Islands, on the Maine side of the Isles of Shoals, from Captain Haley. Laighton later built a hotel on Smuttynose.

The lighthouse was rebuilt during the Civil War with granite walls two feet thick. It was automated in 1987, but fell into disrepair and was rescued by the efforts of The Lighthouse Kids, a group of schoolchildren who pressured the New Hampshire legislature to provide $125,000 to repair the building. Shortly thereafter, the federal government provided $250,000 for further restoration.

The lighthouse was seriously damaged during the Patriot's Day Storm in 2007. Waves washed completely over the island, destroying the solar panels, foghorn, and the covered walk between the lighthouse and the keeper's house.

In 2008, the Coast Guard installed one of the first VLB-44 LED light units in the United States.
