= The Weight of Water (film) =

2000 film by Kathryn Bigelow

- Theatrical release poster
- Directed by: Kathryn Bigelow
- Screenplay by: Alice Arlen; Christopher Kyle
- Based on: The Weight of Water by Anita Shreve
- Produced by: A. Kitman Ho; Sigurjón Sighvatsson; Janet Yang
- Starring: Elizabeth Hurley; Catherine McCormack; Sean Penn; Sarah Polley
- Cinematography: Adrian Biddle
- Edited by: Howard E. Smith
- Music by: David Hirschfelder
- Production companies: Four Water Productions; StudioCanal
- Distributed by: Lionsgate Films (United States); BAC Films (France); StudioCanal (United Kingdom); VMI Releasing (International)
- Release dates: September 9, 2000 (TIFF); July 31, 2002 (France); November 1, 2002 (U.S.)
- Running time: 114 minutes
- Countries: France; United States
- Language: English
- Budget: $16 million
- Box office: $321,279

The Weight of Water is a 2000 psychological thriller film directed by Kathryn Bigelow, and starring Catherine McCormack, Sean Penn, Elizabeth Hurley, Josh Lucas, Vinessa Shaw, Katrin Cartlidge, Ciarán Hinds, and Sarah Polley. Based on Anita Shreve's 1997 novel of the same name, it follows a newspaper photographer who, while researching the murders of two Norwegian immigrants that occurred in the Isles of Shoals in 1873, finds her own life paralleling that of a witness to the crime. The film is told in a nonlinear narrative fashion, contrasting the contemporary events with the semi-fictionalized historical events.

A co-production between the United States and France, The Weight of Water was filmed in late 1999 in Halifax, Nova Scotia. It premiered at the 2000 Toronto International Film Festival before screening at several other film festivals, though it was not released in the United States until November 1, 2002, by Lionsgate Films. It was a box-office bomb, grossing $321,279 against a $16 million budget, and received largely unfavorable reviews from film critics.

== Plot ==
On March 5, 1873, Norwegian immigrants Karen Christenson and her sister-in-law, Anethe Christenson, are brutally murdered on Smuttynose Island, a lonely island among the Isles of Shoals off the New Hampshire coast. Karen's younger sister, Maren Hontvedt, survived the attack. Louis Wagner, who briefly boarded in Maren's house and once tried to seduce her, is convicted of the murders and executed.

In the present, newspaper photographer Jean Janes begins researching the murders, and travels to Smuttynose with her husband Thomas, an award-winning poet. They travel with Thomas's brother Rich, who owns a yacht, and Rich's girlfriend Adaline. In a twist of fate, Jean discovers archived papers apparently written by Maren Hontvedt, which give an account of her life on the island and the events leading up to the murders.

The plot unfolds the narrative of the papers and Hontvedt's testimony against Wagner, while Jean privately struggles with jealousy as Adaline openly flirts with Thomas. Trying to suppress her fears of Adaline as a rival, Jean learns that Maren was brought from Norway to Smuttynose by her husband John, a man for whom she has no passion. Maren staves off melancholy and loneliness on the island by maintaining the homestead. Maren's spirits are lifted when her brother Evan arrives with his new wife, Anethe. Maren simultaneously contends with her sister Karen, a spinster who is stern in temperament and suspicious of her. Initially, Maren views Anethe as a rival for the affections of Evan. Soon, however, she begins to develop a desire for Anethe. The women are drawn closer after an injured Wagner, who has been staying in the Hontvedt home, attempts to sexually assault Anethe.

On the day of the murders, Evan and John depart the island to acquire goods in Portsmouth, after which Anethe reveals to Maren and Karen that she is pregnant. At nightfall, Anethe begs for Maren to allow her to sleep in the same bed, out of fear of their isolated situation. Karen barges in and interprets the two women in bed together as clear evidence of Maren's hidden bisexuality. Karen reveals Maren and Evan's history of incest to Anethe, condemning Maren as a wicked woman unable to control her lust. In a fury, Maren strikes Karen with a chair, incapacitating her. Anethe attempts to escape, but Maren follows her outside and butchers her with an axe. Maren drags Anethe's body inside the house before strangling Karen to death. She then flees the scene, hiding in a cove until morning, after which she implicates Wagner as the killer.

In the present, Rich has begun to flirt openly with Jean, which is noticed by Thomas. The tensions are unleashed in the midst of a turbulent storm while all four are aboard the yacht. Jean pushes Adaline overboard in a jealous rage while the brothers are both below deck. Both Jean and Thomas then plunge into the water, ostensibly to rescue her. Adaline is saved, but Thomas drowns. In a surreal sequence, Jean encounters both Anethe and Maren underwater, before she manages to return to the surface and swim to safety.

The film concludes in the 19th century with Maren's guilt leading her to confess to the murders several years after Wagner had already been hanged. However, the courts refuse to accept Maren's confession, choosing instead to continue to adhere to the jury's original decision.

== Cast ==
- Ciarán Hinds as Louis Wagner (Note: Per the film's opening and end credits, and replicated in other sources.)
- Richard Donat as Mr. Plaisted
- Sarah Polley as Maren Hontvedt
- Ulrich Thomsen as John Hontvedt
- Anders W. Berthelsen as Evan Christenson
- Katrin Cartlidge as Karen Christenson
- Vinessa Shaw as Anethe Christenson
- Adam Curry as Emil Ingerbretson
- Catherine McCormack as Jean Janes
- Sean Penn as Thomas Janes
- Josh Lucas as Rich Janes
- Elizabeth Hurley as Adaline Gunne
- Karl Juliusson as Mr. Christenson

== Production ==
=== Development ===
Director Kathryn Bigelow was partly inspired to adapt Anita Shreve's novel, The Weight of Water (1997), as the story prominently involved Norwegian immigrants; Bigelow's mother herself had immigrated to the United States from Norway. Bigelow had read the novel in manuscript form while filming Strange Days (1995):

I was shooting Strange Days, and sadly, [my mother] passed away at that time. Her side of the family was all Norwegian, so I grew up with these incredible stories of coming to America and trying to make a life here, what they were leaving behind and how difficult it was for them. Their hunger for a new reality kind of overrode everything. These stories haunted my extreme youth, and so quite honestly when I read this in manuscript form it was kind of a way to bring Mom back to life. It was very personal to me.

The screenplay for the film was adapted by Alice Arlen and Christopher Kyle. Like in the film, Shreve's source novel partly retells a semi-fictionalized account of the 1873 double murders of two Norwegian immigrants, a crime for which Louis Wagner was ultimately charged and executed. The murder story is contrasted with a fictional contemporary narrative about a journalist researching the crimes.

The project was originally developed for Phoenix Pictures, though it was ultimately financed by StudioCanal.

=== Casting ===
Sean Penn and Sarah Polley were cast in the film in early August 1999. Bigelow chose to cast Polley after seeing her performance in Atom Egoyan's The Sweet Hereafter (1997).

=== Filming ===
Though set on Smuttynose Island in the Isles of Shoals of the coasts of New Hampshire and Maine, principal photography of The Weight of Water largely took place in and around Halifax, Nova Scotia on a budget of $16 million. Filming began on September 13, 1999, and was planned to last approximately eight weeks. Part of the film was shot in Peggy's Cove.

== Release ==
The Weight of Water premiered at Toronto's Roy Thomson Hall as part of the 2000 Toronto International Film Festival on September 9, 2000. The following week, it screened at the opening gala of the twentieth Atlantic Film Festival in Halifax, followed by a screening at the San Sebastián Film Festival in late September 2000. The film subsequently screened at the London Film Festival on November 15, 2000.

The film was shelved by its distributor Lionsgate Films for over two years before being given a limited theatrical release at 27 theaters in the United States on November 1, 2002. It was released in France earlier that year, premiering on July 31, 2002. Actress Katrin Cartlidge died shortly after the film's premiere in France, and before its United States release.

It would later be released internationally in early 2026 by Vantage Media International, who has acquired new world-wide rights for the film under its VMI Releasing label for overseas broadcast and also North American streaming rights.

=== Home media ===
Lionsgate Home Entertainment released the film on VHS and DVD on March 4, 2003. StudioCanal released the film on Blu-ray in France in 2021. Australian home media label Imprint Films released the film on Blu-ray on March 25, 2025.

== Reception ==
=== Box office ===
The Weight of Water was a box-office bomb, earning $45,888 during its premiere weekend in the United States at 27 theaters, opening alongside I Spy and The Santa Clause 2. It went on to gross $109,130 in the U.S., with an additional $212,149 from international markets, making for a total worldwide gross of $321,279 against a $16 million budget.

=== Critical response ===
The Weight of Water received mixed to largely unfavorable reviews from critics. On internet review aggregator Rotten Tomatoes, the film has an approval rating of 35%, based on reviews from 65 critics. The site's critical summary reads: "The story is too muddled to build any interest". On Metacritic, the film has a score of 45 out of 100, based on reviews from 22 critics. A number of critics felt that the film, which tells a modern fictionalized story parallel to a historical true crime narrative, lacked substance in the former. (Note: Stephen Holden of The New York Times and Peter Howell of the Toronto Star, among others, felt the film's contemporary narrative was lacking in comparison to the historical narrative.) Several critics, including Roger Ebert and Lisa Schwarzbaum, also compared it to Neil LaBute's Possession (2002), a film with a similar structure released the same year.

Stephen Holden of The New York Times wrote: "There is so much to admire in The Weight of Water, Kathryn Bigelow's churning screen adaptation of a novel by Anita Shreve, that when the movie finally collapses on itself late in the game, it leaves you in the frustrating position of having to pick up its scattered pieces and assemble them as best you can". Holden felt the two stories "never mesh". Peter Howell of the Toronto Star praised Bigelow's direction, stating that she "weaves the two stories together efficiently and effectively, though not always clearly," adding that he felt the film may have benefited from an expanded runtime, as he similarly felt the contemporary story lacked substance. Writing for The Guardian, Rob Mackie noted the "parallels and connections between the tales, simmering resentments and claustrophobic relationships. But, though it often looks lovely, neither tale is developed enough to be absorbing"; he did, however, single out Polley's performance as a "stand-out" and awarded the film three out of five stars.

Scott Tobias of The A.V. Club made similar criticisms of the divided narrative, concluding: "Bigelow struggles to recast herself as a visual poet, but her deeply pretentious reverie never comes close to cohering. Part of the problem is the present-day story's insufferable crew," the events of which he likened to Roman Polanski's Knife in the Water (1962). Schwarzbaum, writing for Entertainment Weekly, also felt that the film's contemporary characters and their respective performers were lacking, creating a "sogginess" at odds with the period story. Kirk Honeycutt, reviewing the film after its Toronto premiere, noted that the film had an ineffable quality, writing: "Even in art house terms it's hard to label the film; it's a psychological drama with a murder mystery attached, but the murders took place 127 years ago."

Ebert, writing for the Chicago Sun-Times, gave the film a mixed review, deeming the period story more compelling, though he noted that the screenplay "doesn’t try to force awkward parallels between the two stories, but they are there to be found: hidden and forbidden passion, sibling jealousy, the possibility of violence. The movie tells the two stories so separately, indeed, that each one acts as a distraction from the other." Marc Mohan of The Oregonian noted the film's theme of repressed desire told through the two converging narratives, but concluded: "Unfortunately, though, that theme never quite takes hold by the time of the film's literally stormy climax. The two stories never come close to meshing the way the filmmaker intended. The result is a well-acted movie that simply doesn't gel."

Berge Garabedian of JoBlo.com awarded the film a favorable review, praising Polley's performance and adding: "Penn and Hurley are a little over-the-top, but once you get into this flick's groove, I'm confident that anyone who enjoys period mysteries, as well as tales of infidelity and murder... will enjoy much of what this film has to offer." Salon's Stephanie Zacharek conceded that the film "might not come together as cleanly as it should," but uniformly praised the performances and Bigelow's direction, writing that she "casts a mood of dread over the picture like a velvet net. That sense of dread is half suspenseful and half mournful."

In a 2017 career retrospective for Bigelow published in the Alamo Drafthouse blog Birth.Movies.Death., Alisha Grauso declared the film as "the overlooked cinematic child of Bigelow’s brood, not without reason... It’s possibly the most personal of Bigelow’s films, and certainly ambitious, but to say it’s messy would be generous. Nonlinear storytelling is always tricky, but added to the unconventional narrative is that fact that it’s also told in multiple time frames and periods—there are flashbacks within flashbacks—and from two different perspectives."

=== Accolades ===
Institution	Date	Category	Recipient	Result	Ref.
San Sebastián International Film Festival	2000	Golden Seashell	Kathryn Bigelow	Nominated	
Film by the Sea	2001	Film and Literature Award	Kathryn Bigelow	Won	

== Sources ==
- Jermyn, Deborah (2003). "Cherchez la femme: The Weight of Water and the Search for Bigelow in 'a Bigelow film'". In Jermyn, Deborah; Redmond, Sean (eds.). The Cinema of Kathryn Bigelow: Hollywood Transgressor. New York City, New York: Wallflower Press. pp. 125–143. ISBN 978-1-903-36442-0.
- Keough, Peter, ed. (2013). Kathryn Bigelow: Interviews. Jackson, Mississippi: Univ. Press of Mississippi. ISBN 978-1-617-03774-0.
- Watson, Tracy (2005). Contemporary Authors New Revision Series. Vol. 136. Detroit, Michigan: Cengage. ISBN 978-0-787-66728-3.
