= Celia Thaxter House =

Historic house in Massachusetts, United States

- U.S. National Register of Historic Places
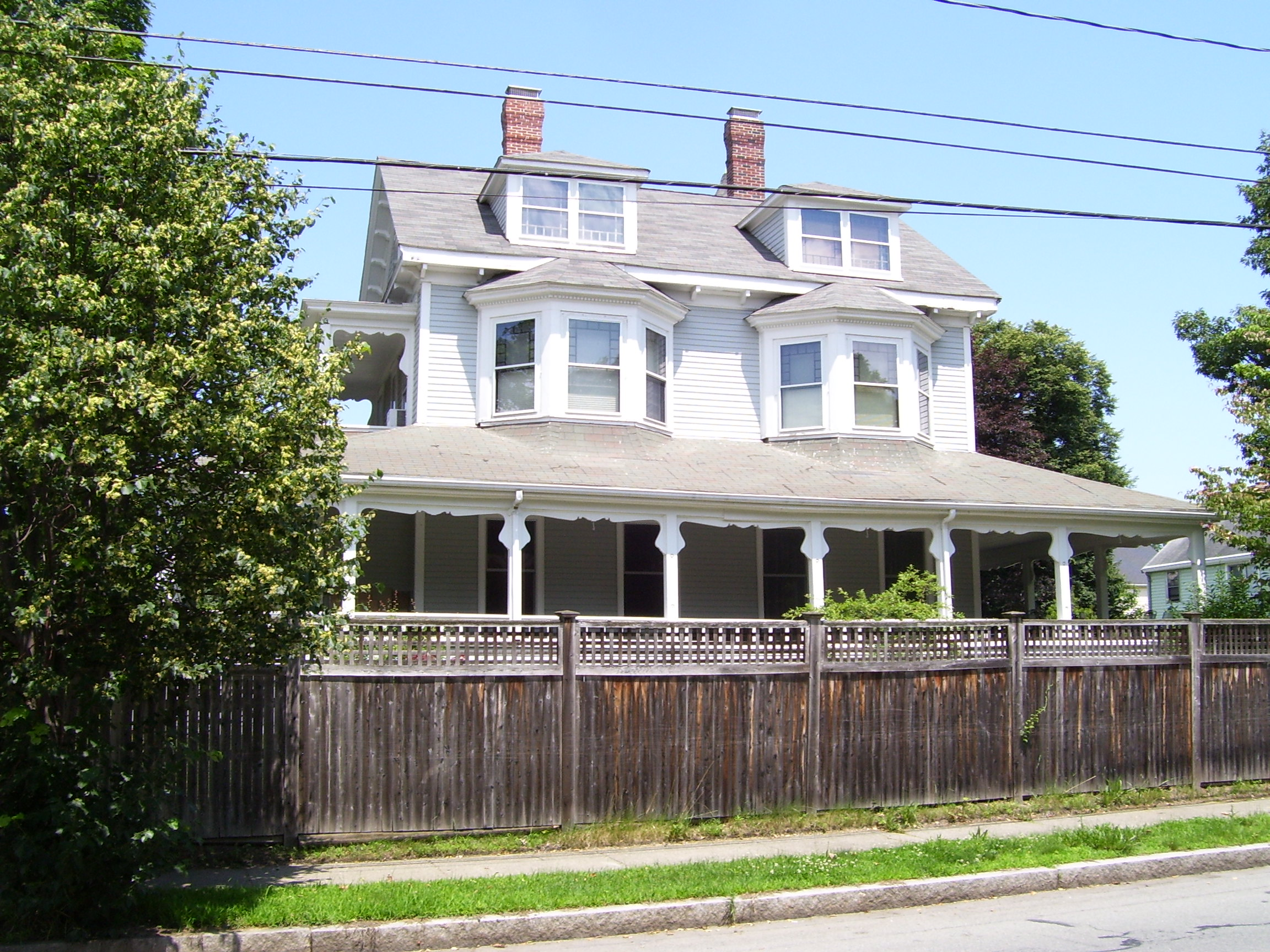

- Location within Massachusetts Location within the United States
- Location: 524 California St., Newton, Massachusetts
- Coordinates: 42°21′41″N 71°12′35″W
- Built: 1856
- Architectural style: Late Victorian, Italianate
- MPS: Newton MRA
- NRHP reference No.: 86001892
- Added to NRHP: September 04, 1986

The Celia Thaxter House is an historic house at 524 California Street in the village of Newtonville in Newton, Massachusetts. The Italianate house was built c. 1856 as the home of Levi Lincoln Thaxter and American poet and author Celia Thaxter. The Thaxters lived here until 1880 when she moved to Kittery Point, Maine. It was in the Newtonville house that Celia Thaxter wrote her early poetry, and where the Thaxters played host to high-profile members of Boston's literary community.

The house was listed on the National Register of Historic Places in 1986.

== See also ==
- National Register of Historic Places listings in Newton, Massachusetts
