= The Weight of Water =

1997 novel by Anita Shreve

- First edition cover
- Author: Anita Shreve
- Language: English
- Genre: Historical fiction
- Publisher: Little, Brown and Company
- Publication date: 1997
- Publication place: United States
- Media type: Print (Hardcover and Paperback)
- Pages: 256 pp
- ISBN: 0-316-78997-6
- OCLC: 34633469
- Dewey Decimal: 813/.54 20
- LC Class: PS3569.H7385 W43 1997

The Weight of Water is a 1997 novel by Anita Shreve. Half of the novel is historical fiction based on the Smuttynose Island murders, which took place in 1873.

The book was adapted for a film of the same name, directed by Kathryn Bigelow and released in 2000.

== Plot summary ==
In March 1873, two Norwegian-born women who lived on the desolate Smuttynose Island, one of the Isles of Shoals off the coast of Maine and New Hampshire, were brutally murdered. Maren Hontvedt, a sister of one of the victims, survived by hiding in a sea cave until dawn. The murdered women were her older sister Karen Christensen and Anethe Christensen, their sister-in-law. A man named Louis Wagner was tried and hanged for their murders, mostly on circumstantial evidence. His conviction has been argued about, as some people think he could not have done it.

More than a century later, Jean Janes, a magazine photographer working on a photo essay about the murders, returns to the Isles with her husband Thomas and five-year-old daughter. Thomas is an award-winning poet who has been struggling with alcoholism and not writing much. Hoping to have a small vacation, they travel on a boat skippered by Thomas' brother Rich, who has brought along his girlfriend Adaline.

Jean becomes immersed in the details of the 19th-century murders after discovering a purported memoir of Maren in the library. Gradually, tensions increase among the group on the sloop, with unspoken emotions surfacing. Jean begins to suspect an affair between Thomas and Adaline.

The novel is split into two parts: the present day, told from Jean's point of view and in the present tense; and 1873, told in first person from Maren's point of view, her "memoir".

== Reception ==
Kirkus Reviews wrote "...Shreve (Resistance, 1995, etc.) deftly juxtaposes a strained modern marriage and a century-old double murder".

== Adaptation ==
A film adaptation of the same name, directed by Kathryn Bigelow, was released in 2002. It starred Sean Penn, Catherine McCormack, Elizabeth Hurley and Sarah Polley.
