= Celia Thaxter =

American writer

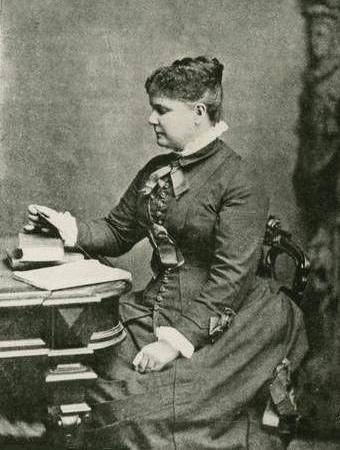
- Born: Celia Laighton; June 29, 1835; Portsmouth, New Hampshire, US
- Died: August 25, 1894 (aged 59); Appledore Island, Isles of Shoals, Maine, US
- Occupations: poet, writer
- Spouse: Levi Thaxter (m. 1851)
- Writing career
- Language: English
- Notable works: An Island Garden, Among the Isles of Shoals

Celia Thaxter (née Laighton; June 29, 1835 – August 25, 1894) was an American writer of poetry and stories. For most of her life, she lived with her father on the Isles of Shoals at his Appledore Hotel. How she grew up to become a writer is detailed in her early autobiography (published by St. Nicholas), and her book entitled Among the Isles of Shoals. Thaxter became one of America's favorite authors in the late 19th century. Among her best-known poems are "The Burgomaster Gull", "Landlocked", "Milking", "The Great White Owl", "The Kingfisher", and "The Sandpiper". Many of her romantic poems are addressed to women; as such, she has been identified by some scholars as a lesbian poet.

== Early years and education ==
Celia Laighton was born in Portsmouth, New Hampshire, June 29, 1835, but the family moved soon after to the Isles of Shoals, first on White Island, where her father, Thomas Laighton, was a lighthouse keeper of the Isles of Shoals Light, and then on Smuttynose and Appledore Islands. The gradual addition of summer visitors to the fishing population came slowly, Thaxter's father being the first to establish anything like a modern hotel.

The means of education were comparatively remote, and the permanent society of the islands for the greater part of the year offered very limited resources for a bright child. During the period of 1849–1850, she attended Mount Washington Female Seminary in South Boston.

== Career ==
=== Mainland ===
Thaxter's home in Watertown

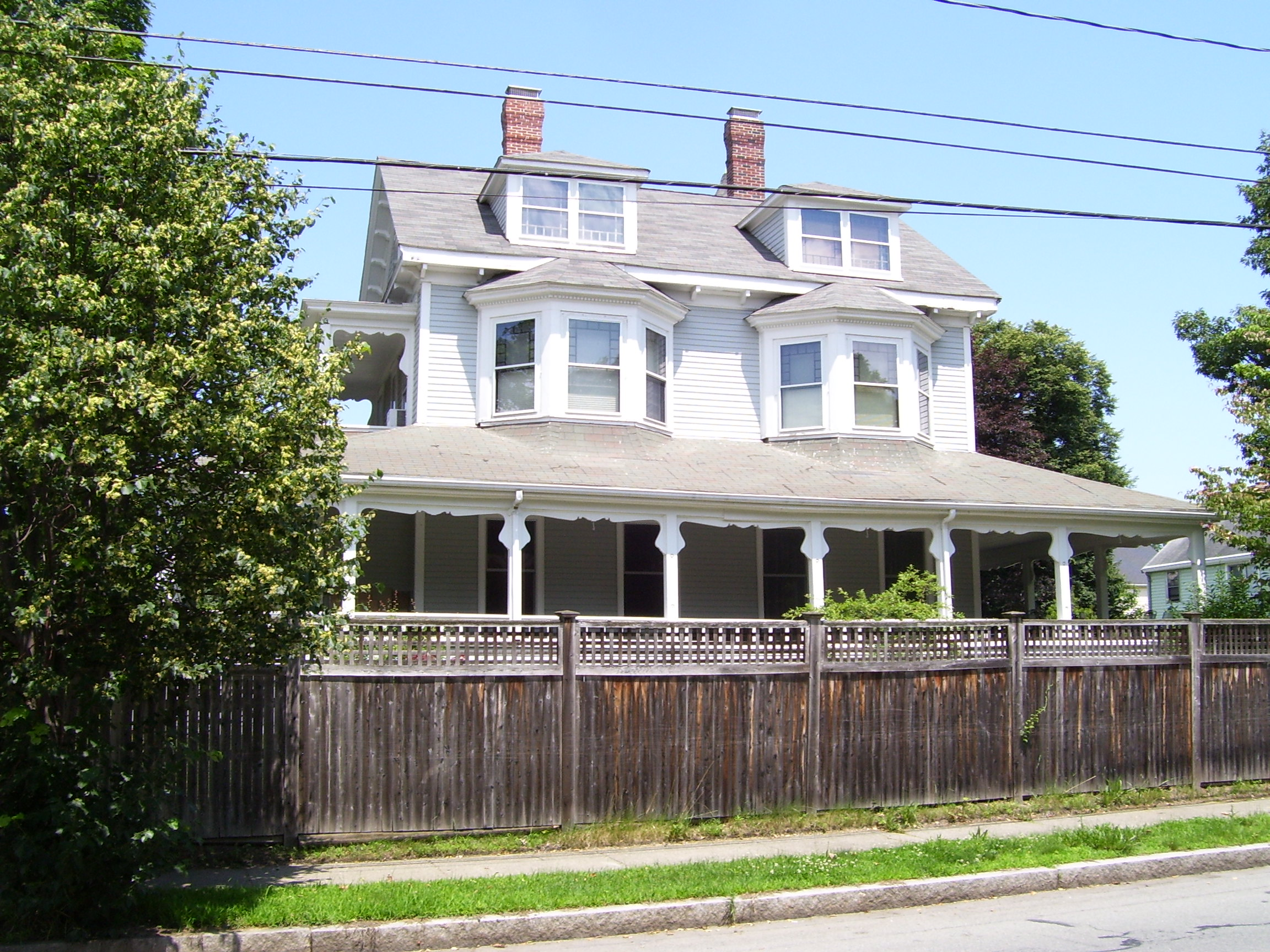
The Celia Thaxter House, Newtonville

On September 13, 1851, at the age of 16, she married Levi Thaxter and moved to the mainland, residing first in Watertown, Massachusetts, at a property his father owned. In 1854, they accepted an offer to use a house in Newburyport. The couple then acquired their own home, today called the Celia Thaxter House, built in 1856 near the Charles River at Newtonville. By then, they had two sons, Karl and John. Roland was born in 1858, and went on to become a prominent mycologist who taught at Harvard University where he studied insect-associated fungi and Myxobacteria.

Her first published poem was written during this time on the mainland. That poem, "Land-Locked", was first published in the Atlantic Monthly in 1861 and earned her US$10. In 1879, Thaxter suddenly became known upon the literary horizon with a collection of poems entitled Driftwood, and considering that they came from a group of islands, away from the mainland far enough to prevent frequent communication, the debuting work was received with almost as much surprise as pleasure. Although stray poems of the ocean had been published, signed with the name of "Celia Thaxter", still it was difficult for the critical reviewer of Boston to realize that the bearer of this name was actually a long time resident, if not exactly a native of those isles lying off the coast of New Hampshire. Her poetry appeared in the Atlantic, Century, Harper's, Independent, New England Magazine, and Scribner's, while her writing for juvenile audiences appeared in Our Young Folks and St. Nicholas.

=== Return to Appledore Island ===
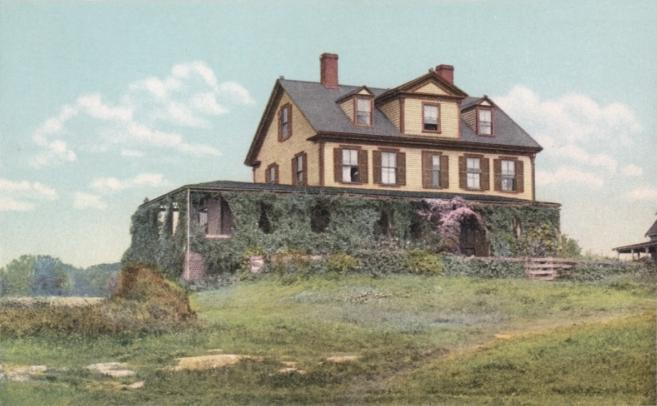
Thaxter's cottage on Appledore Island

Karl, who had mental illness since childhood, traveled with Thaxter during the periods she returned to the islands, while the two younger sons traveled with the husband to Florida after his serious illness in 1868–69. Her life with Levi was not harmonious, and there were other periods of separation, She missed her islands, and so after ten years away, Thaxter moved back to Appledore Island. She became the hostess of her father's hotel, the Appledore House, and welcomed many New England literary and artistic notables to the island and to her parlor, including writers Ralph Waldo Emerson, Nathaniel Hawthorne, Henry Wadsworth Longfellow, John Whittier, Sarah Orne Jewett, and the artists William Morris Hunt and Childe Hassam, the latter of whom painted several pictures of her. The watercolorist Ellen Robbins also painted the flowers in her garden. Celia was present at the time of the infamous murders on Smuttynose Island, about which she wrote the essay A Memorable Murder.

William Morris Hunt, a close family friend, spent the last months of his life on Appledore Island, trying to recover from a crippling depression. He drowned in late summer 1879, three days after finishing his last sketch. Celia Thaxter discovered the painter's body, an apparent suicide. That same year, the Thaxters bought 186 acres (75 hectares) along Seapoint Beach on Cutts Island, Kittery Point, where they built a grand Shingle Style "cottage" called Champernowne Farm. In 1880, they auctioned the Newtonville house, and removed to Kittery Point, Maine. In 1881, she vacationed in Europe with her brother, Oscar. In the same year, Thaxter and her husband moved to the new home in Kittery Point. In March 1888, her friend Whittier hoped "on that lonesome, windy coast where she can only look upon the desolate, winter-bitten pasture-land and the cold grey sea" she could be comforted by "memories of her Italian travels".

== Death and legacy ==
Thaxter died suddenly while on Appledore Island. She was buried not far from her cottage, which burned in the 1914 fire that destroyed The Appledore House hotel. The Kittery Point home stayed in the family until the 1989 death of her granddaughter and biographer, Rosamond Thaxter. In 2008, The Library of America selected "A Memorable Murder" for inclusion in its two-century retrospective of American True Crime.

== Themes ==
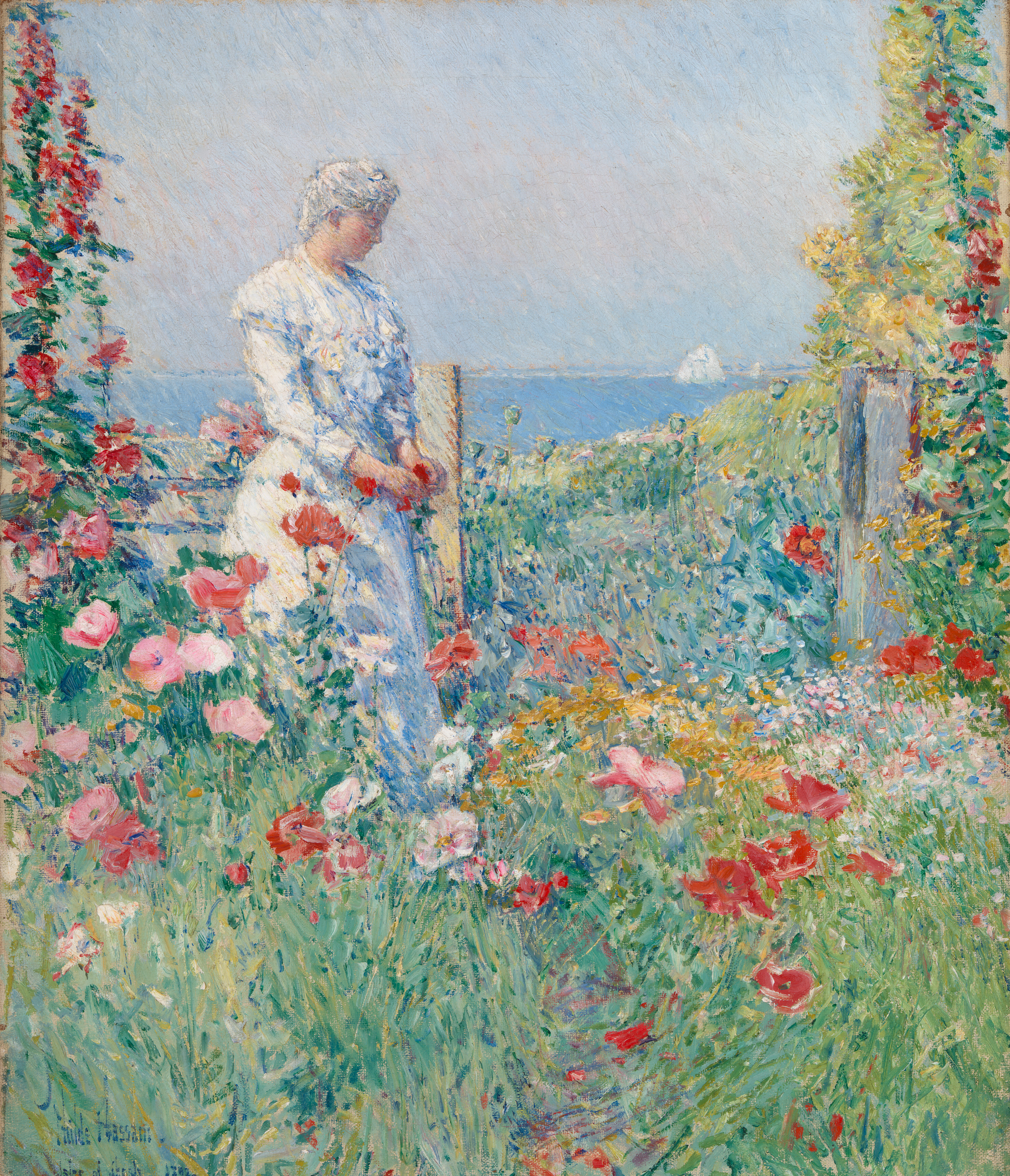
Celia Thaxter in her Garden, 1892, by Childe Hassam

Several of her poems are noted for their lesbian themes. Thaxter's "Two Sonnets," addressed to a woman, parallels the romantic passion present in Wharton's sonnet sequence "The Mortal Lease," addressed to a man. Thaxter frequently brings together natural imagery and romantic desires; in the poem "Alone," she writes "I would have given my soul to be That rose she touched so tenderly!"

Very early in her literary career, Thaxter attracted the sympathy and admiration of some of the best writers and critics of the day. Among the most enthusiastic of her admirers was Thomas Wentworth Higginson, a scholar who loved the sea and was one of the most competent judges of ocean nature painting of literati from that time. He found her work to be versatile and was of the opinion that there is hardly a moral idea, a practical point in ethics, or an emotion of the human heart which has not been the subject of her pen.

== Style ==
In Thaxter's prose writing, the picturesque prevails, though with some marked exceptions; in all is a moral undercurrent which crops out more or less prominently in all of her productions—prose or poetry. She wrote some charming poems for children, with such an exquisite blending of the didactic with the scenic and emotional, that the intended lesson was conveyed without exciting the natural repulsion of children to "morals," too obviously conveyed.

== Selected works ==
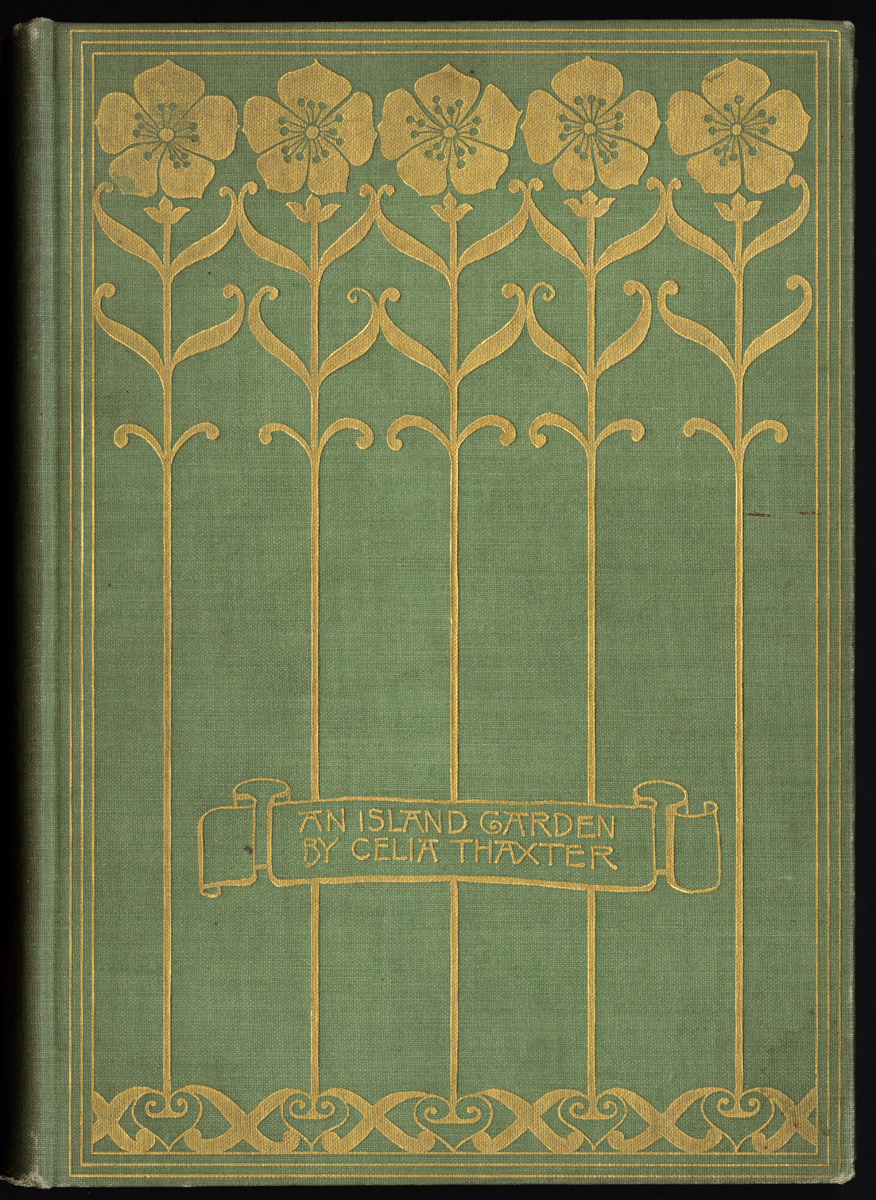
An island garden (1894)

- The lost bell. A legend of the island of Rügen in the Baltic Sea.
- Good bye, sweet day. (music, with Kate Vannah & Elsie Baker)
- The sandpiper
- Land-locked, 1861
- A poppy seed, 187?
- A memorable murder, 1875
- Among the Isles of Shoals, 1878
- The Nursery for youngest readers, 1878
- Idyls and pastorals, a home gallery of poetry and art., 1886
- The cruise of the Mystery and other poems, 1886
- My lighthouse, and other poems, 1890
- An island garden, 1894
- The poems of Celia Thaxter, 1896
- Stories and Poems for Children
- Woman's heartlessness, 1900
