= Kate Vannah =

American poet

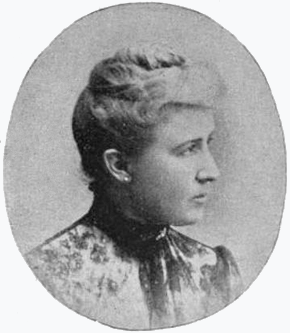
Kate Vannah

Kate Vannah (pen name, Kate Van Twinkle; 1855–1933) was an American organist, pianist, composer, and writer. Of her music, more was sold in her day than that of any other composer in the US, excepting Reginald De Koven.

== Early years and education ==
Vannah was born in Gardiner, Maine and received her education in its public schools, graduating from Gardiner high school. She graduated with high honors from the St. Joseph's Academy at Emmitsburg, Maryland. She played the organ at the Catholic church in Gardiner, it being her favorite instrument. She also studied piano with Ernst Perabo of Boston, and composition with Eversmann of Baltimore, Maryland and George Washington Marston of Portland, Maine.

== Career ==
Vannah tried her hand at journalism, writing for the Boston, New York City, and Philadelphia papers, and for several Maine papers, under the name of Kate Van Twinkle. Her poetry was superior, and was widely copied. In 1892, a book of her poems, "Verses", was published by J. B. Lippincott & Co., and this was followed by another book of poems in 1893, "From Heart to Heart".

Her first songs were published when she was eighteen. Her first notable hit was the song "Good-bye, Sweet Day". Vannah published about fifty songs and perhaps a dozen instrumental pieces. Regarding her methods, Vannah said:

My work is the greatest possible pleasure to me when I am in the mood. I work like a Trojan at times. I have done six songs in ten days, but that is rather beyond my average rate. I probably write from twelve to fifteen songs a year, but I do not work constantly. Sometimes for a month I will not touch pen to paper, and then I will make up for lost time by working almost continuously for the next month. It is hard to say just how I write. I will read a little poem, perhaps, and then the melody comes, and, do you know, that particular melody is always thereafter connected with that poem. I might put the poem aside and not look at it again for a dozen years, but when I did, that same melody would leap into my mind at once.

Vannah preferred the serious love ballad to any other style of song, but she was versatile and has written various melodies. Of her music, more was sold in her day than that of any other composer in the US, excepting Reginald De Koven.

== Bibliography ==
- Hills, William Henry; Luce, Robert (1902). The Writer: A Monthly Magazine for Literary Workers. Writer Publishing Company.
- Room, Adrian (1 July 2010). Dictionary of Pseudonyms: 13,000 Assumed Names and Their Origins, 5th ed. McFarland. ISBN 978-0-7864-5763-2.
- The Usulines (1897). Immortelles of Catholic Columbian Literature: Compiled from the Work of American Catholic Women Writers (Public domain ed.). New York City: D. H. McBride.
