= Smuttynose Island =

Island in York County, Maine, United States

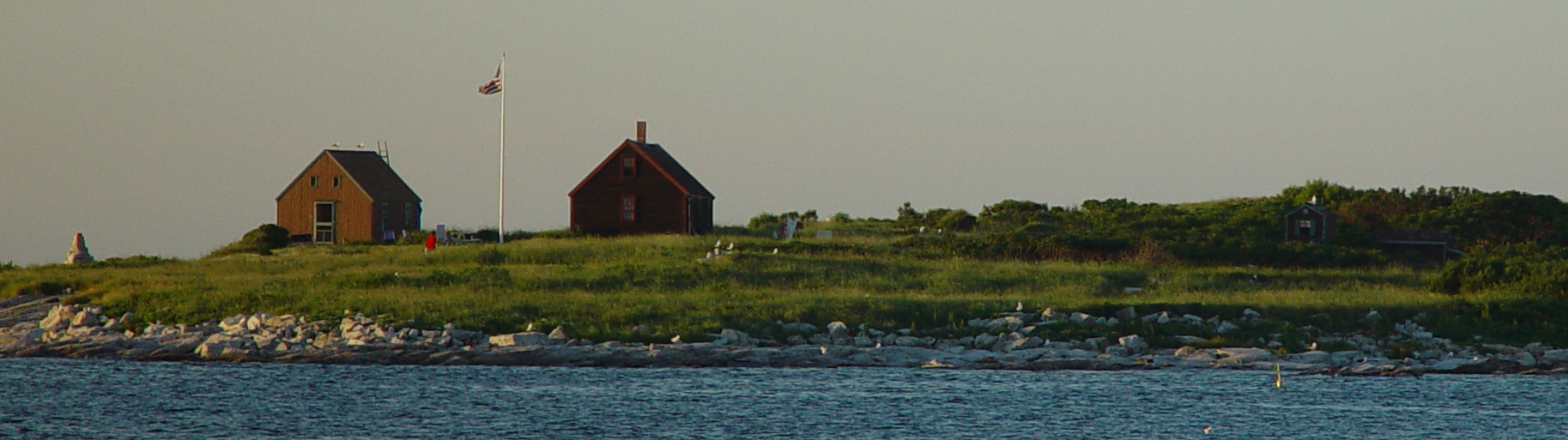
- Smuttynose Island

- Location within Maine

Geography
- Location: Gulf of Maine
- Coordinates: 42.9824°N 70.6061°W
- Archipelago: Isles of Shoals
- Area: 27 acres (11 ha)

Administration
- United States
- State: Maine
- County: York County

Smuttynose Island (formerly "Smutty-nose") is a 27-acre island in the Isles of Shoals, a group of small islands and tidal ledges located 6 miles (10 km) off the coast of New Hampshire and 7 miles (11 km) off the coast of Maine, United States. Smuttynose and some of the other islands in the Isles of Shoals are part of the town of Kittery in York County, Maine.

The island was named by fishermen who thought the profuse seaweed at one end made it look like the "smutty nose" of some vast sea animal.

Smuttynose Island is the source of the name of the Smuttynose Brewing Company of Hampton, New Hampshire.

== Smuttynose murders ==
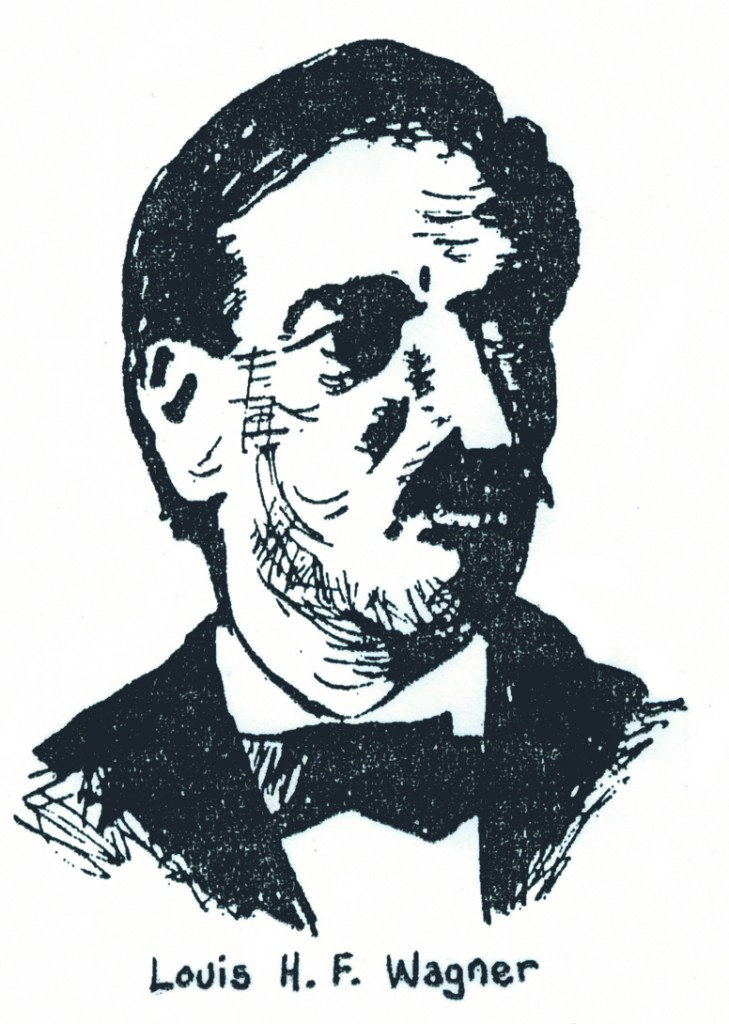
Drawing of Louis H. F. Wagner c. 1873

The island is best known for the Smuttynose murders (also known as the Isles of Shoals murders), a sensational crime which occurred on March 6, 1873.

=== The crime ===
Three Norwegian immigrant women (Maren Hontvet, her sister Karen Christensen and their brother's wife, Anethe Christensen) were alone overnight in the only occupied house on the island, which belonged to Maren and her husband John. Shortly after 1 a.m., the three women were awakened by an intruder who beat and strangled Karen to death and used the Hontvets' own axe to kill Anethe. Maren was able to escape through a window and hid among rocks until daybreak, when she made her way over a breakwater and signaled to a neighboring island for help.

=== Arrest and trial ===
Maren Hontvet identified Louis Wagner, a German-born fisherman who had once worked on her husband's fishing boat and been a boarder in their home, as the killer.

In addition to Maren's eyewitness identification, there was a great deal of circumstantial evidence against Wagner:

- Wagner's boots matched the bloody prints found on Smuttynose Island and a bloody shirt was found hidden in the outhouse of his Portsmouth boarding house the morning after the murders. His landlady, Mrs. Johnson, and her daughter both testified they had seen Wagner carrying a bundle to the outhouse, and Mrs. Johnson identified the bloody shirt as one she had often laundered and pressed for Wagner.
- Mrs. Johnson also testified that another man had spent the night on the boarding house's downstairs sofa where Wagner claimed to have slept that night and that she had seen Wagner arrive home at about 7 a.m., wet and disheveled.
- Wagner purchased new clothing later that day with the same amount of cash ($15) stolen from the Hontvet house, although he had been too broke to pay his rent the day before.
- Among coins found in his pocket when he was arrested the day after the murders was a button which Maren testified she had given Karen from her sewing-box and seen Karen place in her coin purse.
- Witnesses testified they had seen him rowing a wooden dory several hours after the murders, and a stolen dory that was found on shore near where he had been seen had its newly-replaced thole pins worn down, as if it had been rowed for hours
- John Hontvet, his brother Matthew and Anethe's husband, Even, all stated that they had seen Wagner in Portsmouth the afternoon before the murders and he had asked three times if they would be returning home to Smuttynose Island that night or if the women would be alone, and that Wagner had agreed to come help them set traps on John's fishing boat that evening but never arrived.
- Wagner was unable to name the fishing boat or even the location of the pier where he claimed he had been working that night instead, nor could he give the name or location of the saloon he said he went to afterward.

Wagner was tried, convicted and (after briefly escaping) hanged for the crime by the state of Maine on June 25, 1875. While awaiting execution, he told visitors that Maren herself was the real killer and her husband had paid witnesses to frame him for the crime. Some found his professions of innocence so compelling that they came to believe he was not guilty.

An axe said to be the one that Wagner used to kill Anethe Christensen is on display at the Portsmouth Athenaeum.

=== In media ===
Writer Celia Thaxter, a resident of neighboring Appledore Island who had employed Karen Christensen at her island hotel until shortly before the murders, published an account of the crime in Atlantic Monthly magazine in 1875 titled A Memorable Murder.

John Perrault, poet laureate of Portsmouth from 2003 to 2005, first heard the story of the murders from Celia Thaxter's granddaughter in the early 1970s. He composed a murder ballad about the crime titled The Ballad of Louis Wagner and released it on his 1981 album New Hampshire.

J. Dennis Robinson recounted the crime and the evidence against Louis Wagner in his 2019 book Mystery on the Isles of Shoals: Closing the Case on the Smuttynose Ax Murders of 1873, in which he concluded that there was overwhelming proof the correct person had been executed for the murders. Among other evidence, Robinson pointed out that Maren named Wagner as the killer immediately upon being rescued from the island early the next morning and that if she had been lying, she would have been taking a great risk of her story being exposed, as she had no way of knowing how many people might have seen him on the mainland at the time of the murders.

Anita Shreve fictionalized the story of the murders in her 1997 novel The Weight of Water, in which she depicted Maren as the killer. It was later made into a film of the same name starring Sean Penn and Elizabeth Hurley.
