= Appledore Island =

Island off the coast of Maine, U.S.

Coordinates: 42°59′21″N 70°36′54″W

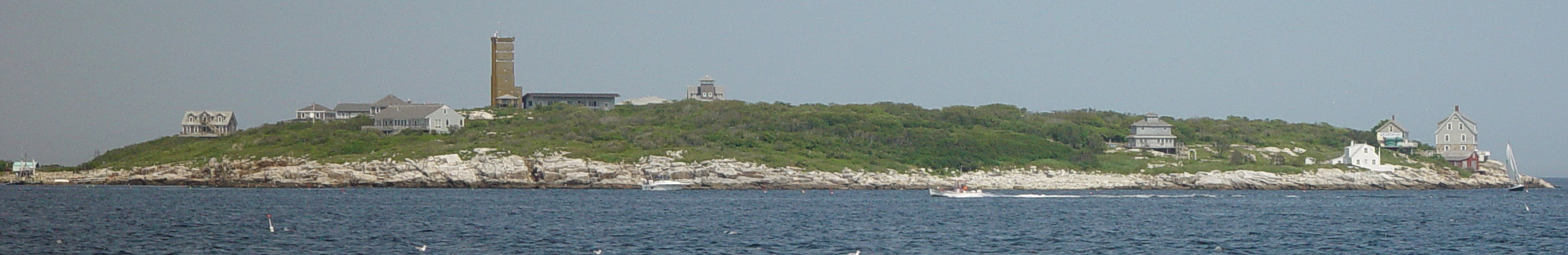
Appledore Island from the west

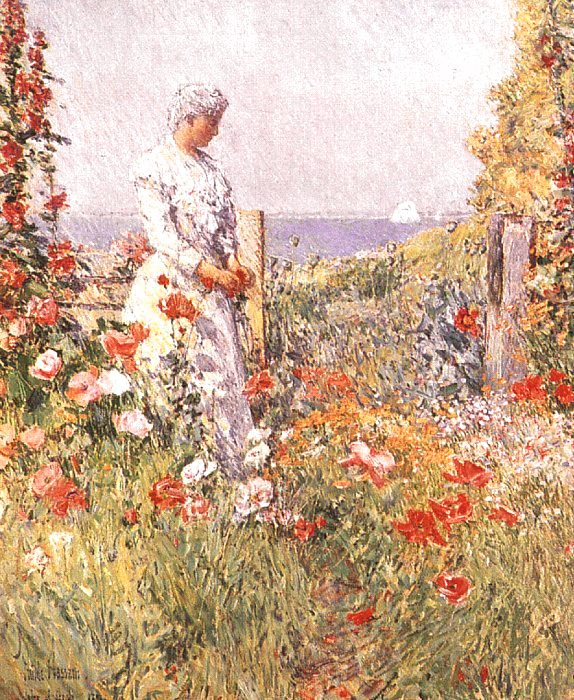
Celia Thaxter in Her Garden, 1892, by Childe Hassam

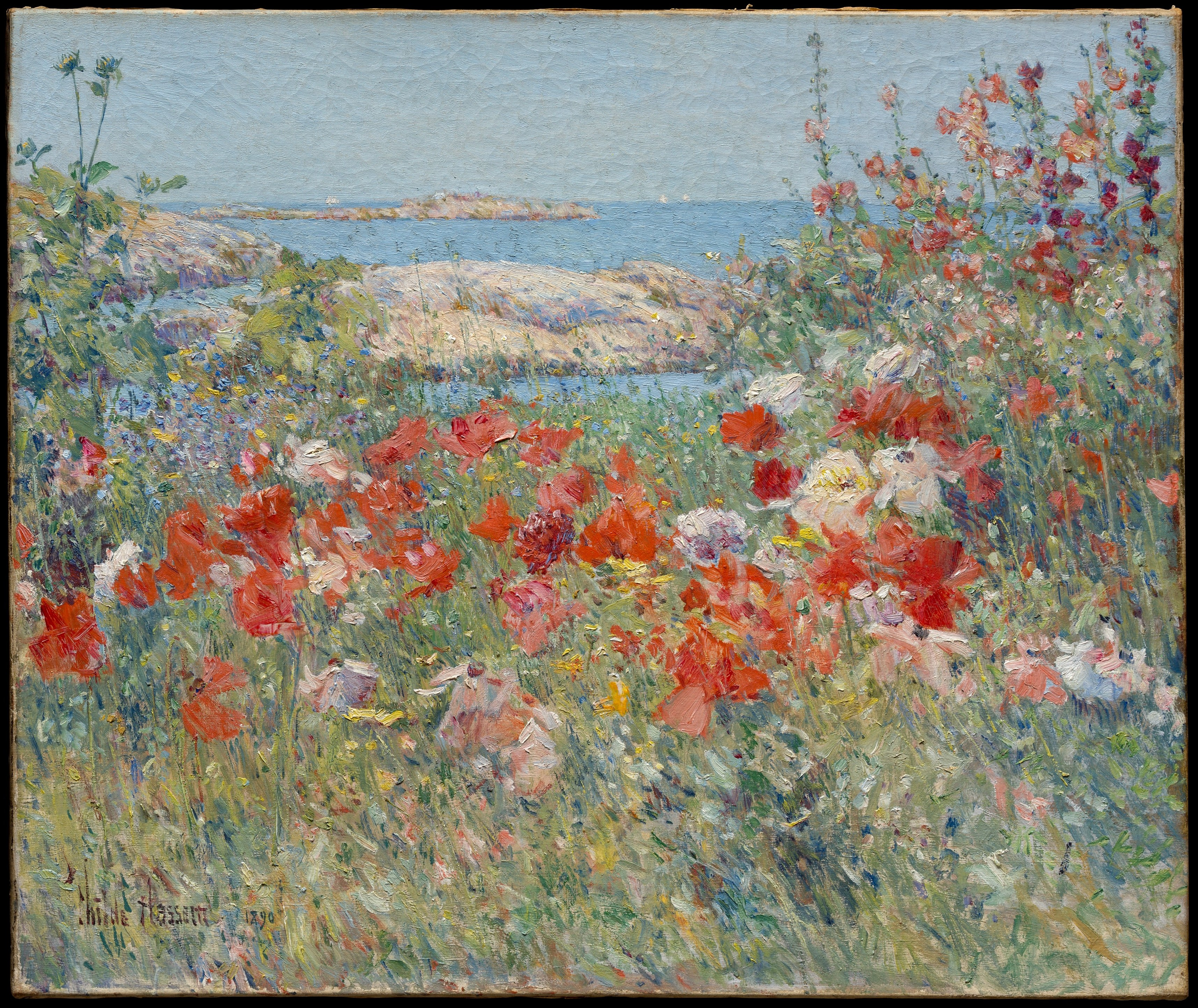
Celia Thaxter's Garden, 1890, by Childe Hassam, The Metropolitan Museum of Art, New York City

Appledore Island (formerly known as Hog Island) is the largest of the Isles of Shoals located about seven miles (11 km) off the Maine coast. It is part of the Town of Kittery, in York County.

== History ==
Appledore Island was originally settled by Europeans in the colonial era, when the ease of transport by water made farming on an island economically efficient. A church was established in 1640. Near 1700, the entire settlement on this island moved to Star Island in New Hampshire to escape taxes imposed by Massachusetts (of which Maine was then a province).

The heyday of the island was the artists salon that thrived there in the late 19th century, before the advent of artists' colonies as we know them today. Celia Thaxter reigned over an impressive group of friends who were also the leading artists, musicians, and writers of the day. These included Edward MacDowell and his wife; American pianist William Mason, son of Lowell Mason, who played the grand piano in her salon daily; and John Knowles Paine, America's first serious composer of note. Childe Hassam painted Celia's magnificent garden in a style similar to Monet's Giverny paintings. The hotel burned in 1914, bringing down the final curtain on this heyday in American arts. A charming small original daybook from this time period was re-published in part, in 1992, titled The Isles of Shoals Remembered, by Caleb Mason.

The island is home to Shoals Marine Laboratory, run cooperatively by Cornell University and the University of New Hampshire since the early 1970s. Appledore Island is owned predominantly by the Star Island Corporation.

The most prominent feature on the island is a World War II concrete observation tower built to hold a radar installation. The dome intended to hold the radar no longer exists, and the radar unit was never installed.

== Geology ==
The maximum elevation of Appledore is approximately 80 feet above sea level. The majority of the island has a metamorphic makeup, with gneiss being the most prevalent. The formation of the island is thought to be characterized by five major geological events: namely, formation of the Rye Complex of Maine and New Hampshire, intrusion of diorites, Acadian orogeny, diabase dikes, and glaciation.

Evidence of these events can be seen in glacial scarps, evidence of abrasion, presence of dikes, glacial plucking, and more. For example, glacial plucking contributed to the whaleback shape of the island which is resultant of rock drumlin cliff faces.

== See also ==
- List of islands of Maine
