= Isles of Shoals =

Group of small islands off the coast of New Hampshire and Maine, US

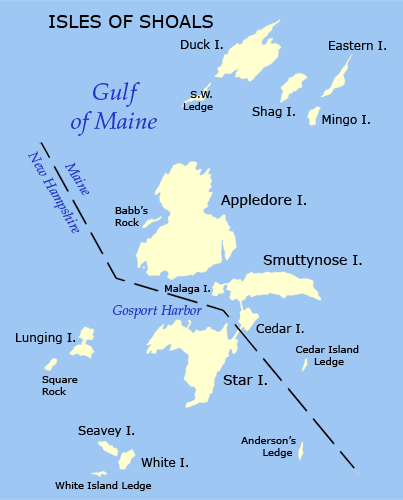
- Isles of Shoals
- Interactive map of Isles of Shoals

Geography
- Location: Gulf of Maine, Atlantic Ocean
- Coordinates: 42°58′53″N 70°36′41″W
- Total islands: 9 (Maine: 5; New Hampshire: 4)
- Major islands: Appledore, Star, Smuttynose

Administration
- United States
- States: Maine and New Hampshire
- Counties: York County, Maine / Rockingham County, New Hampshire
- Towns: Kittery, Maine / Rye, New Hampshire
- Isles of Shoals
- U.S. National Register of Historic Places
- U.S. Historic district
- Location within Maine Location within the United States
- Nearest city: Portsmouth, New Hampshire
- Area: 145.6 acres (58.9 ha)
- Built: 1614
- NRHP reference No.: 74000325
- Added to NRHP: May 16, 1974

The Isles of Shoals are a group of small islands and tidal ledges situated approximately 6 miles (10 km) off the east coast of the United States, straddling the border of the states of Maine and New Hampshire.

They have been occupied for more than 400 years, first by fishing communities and more recently as the site of private homes, a large seasonal hotel and a marine research facility.

The islands contain two extreme points of both states in close proximity; the easternmost point of New Hampshire, and the southernmost point of Maine.

== History ==
Some of the islands were used for seasonal fishing camps by Indigenous peoples and first settled by Europeans in the early 17th century. They became one of the many fishing areas for the young British and French colonies. This was one of the most northern fishing ports, the closest one to the south being Rockport, Massachusetts. The Isles of Shoals were named the "Smith Iles" by English explorer Capt. John Smith after sighting them in 1614. This name did not last once colonization of New England by the British began. The first recorded landfall of an Englishman was that of explorer Captain Christopher Levett, whose 300 fishermen in six ships discovered that the Isles of Shoals were largely abandoned in 1623.

"The first place I set my foot upon in New England was the Isle of Shoals, being islands in the sea about two leagues from the main," Levett wrote later. "Upon these islands I neither could see one good timber-tree nor so much good ground as to make a garden. The place is found to be a good fishing-place for six ships, but more can not be well there, for want of convenient stage room, as this year's experience hath proved."

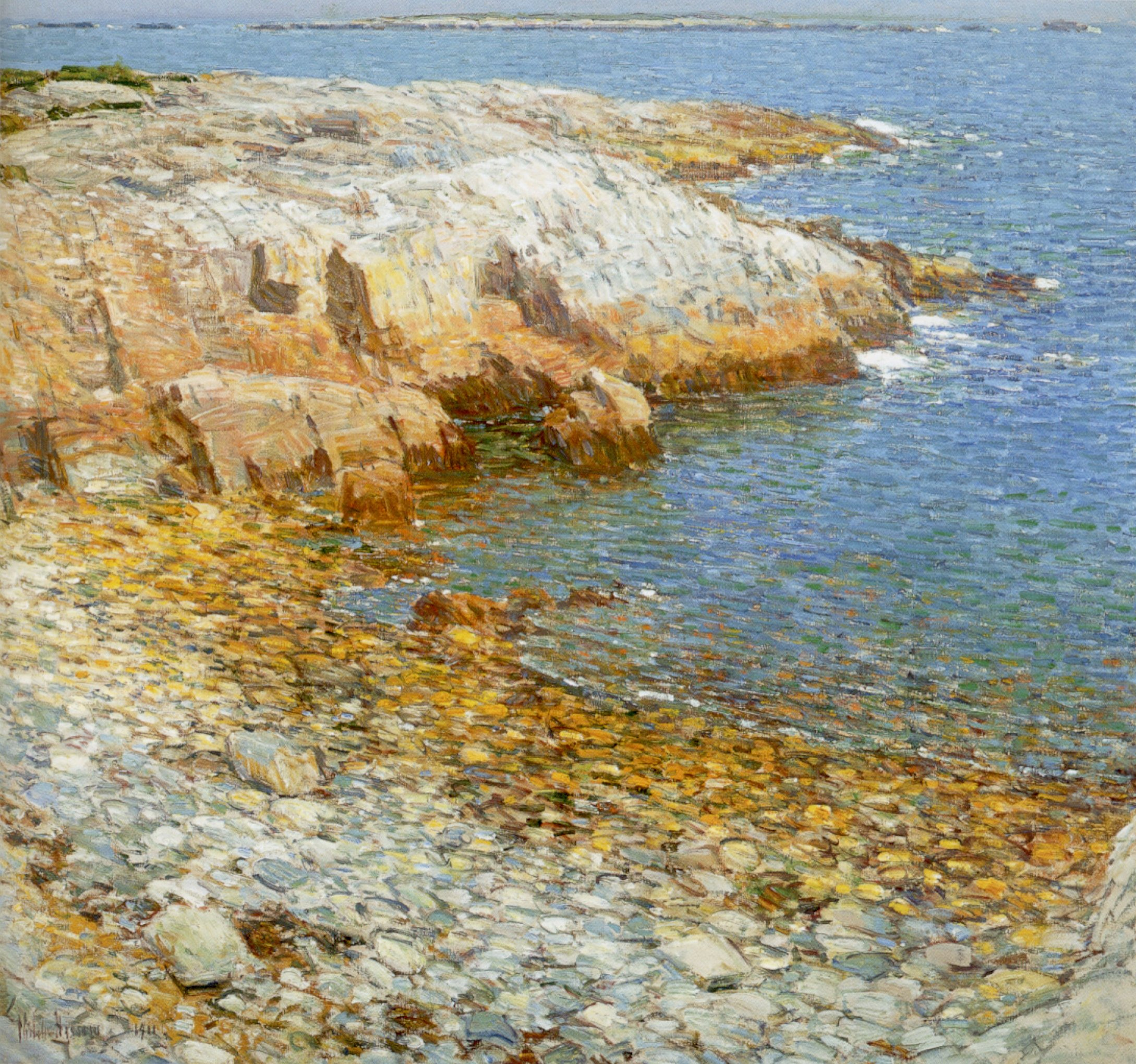
Childe Hassam. Isles of Shoals, Broad Cove, 1911. Oil on canvas. Honolulu Museum of Art.

In 1628 the Plymouth Pilgrims exiled Thomas Morton on the island due to his libertine activities with the Indians at Merrymount.

The first town, "Apledoore", included all of the Isles of Shoals, and was incorporated by the General Court of the Massachusetts Bay Colony on May 22, 1661. At that time, the province of New Hampshire and the province of Maine were both part of Massachusetts Bay Colony. By 1665, the name of the town had changed to "Iles of Shoales". Starting in 1680 and continuing for several years, there was a general migration of the population to Star Island in what is now New Hampshire, departing from Hog Island (now known as Appledore) in what is now Maine. In 1696, the town was annexed by Kittery. In 1715 the township of Gosport was established by New Hampshire on Star Island.

The Gosport community was fairly prosperous up until about 1778, when the islanders were evacuated to Rye, New Hampshire, due to the Revolutionary War. Though a small population remained, the islands were largely abandoned until the middle of the 19th century, when Thomas Laighton and Levi Thaxter opened a popular summer hotel on Appledore Island. Laighton's daughter, Celia, married Levi at the age of fifteen and as Celia Thaxter became the most popular American female poet of the 19th century. She hosted an arts community on the island frequented by authors including Nathaniel Hawthorne, John Greenleaf Whittier, Oliver Wendell Holmes and Sarah Orne Jewett, and the Impressionist painter Childe Hassam. Having executed his last drawing three days previous, the Boston painter William Morris Hunt drowned there in 1879, reportedly a suicide. Hunt's body was discovered by Celia Thaxter.

William James visited the Isles of Shoals in 1873. His experiences were recalled in a letter to brother Henry James dated July 14–16 [1873]. At one point he reminisces, "I just lay around drinking the air and the light and the sounds. I succeeded in reading no word for three days, and then took Goethe's Gedichte out on my walks, and with them in my memory, the smell of the laurels and pines in my nose, and the rhythmic pounding of the surf upon my ear, I was free and happy again.

The popularity of Laighton's Appledore House soon led to establishment of the Mid-Ocean House on Smuttynose Island, and the Oceanic Hotel, which is still in use today on Star Island.

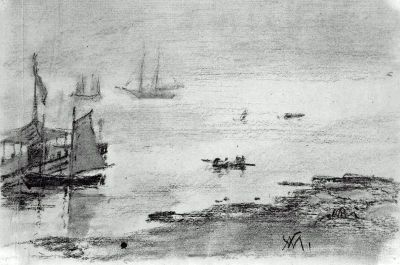
Maine, View of Appledore, 1879, William Morris Hunt, charcoal on paper

== Appledore Island ==
Appledore Island, in Maine, is the largest of the Isles of Shoals, at 95 acres (38 ha). Formerly known as Hog Island, and prior to that as Farm Island, it is approximately 0.5 miles (0.8 km) from east to west, and 0.6 miles (1.0 km) from north to south. It was home to a large hotel, The Appledore House, during the 19th century. Built in 1847 and opened the following year, the hotel was lost to a fire in 1914. According to Celia Thaxter, as late as 1873, "Philip Babb, or some evil-minded descendant of his, haunted Appledore." Today, the island is the operating station of the Shoals Marine Laboratory, run cooperatively by Cornell University and the University of New Hampshire. The island is mostly owned by the Star Island Corporation.

== Star Island ==
Second in size at 46 acres (19 ha), Star Island is located in New Hampshire within the borders of the town of Rye and is the only island served by a commercial boat from the mainland. It is a religious and educational conference center, owned by the Star Island Corporation, which is affiliated with the Unitarian Universalist Association and the United Church of Christ. During the summer, the island hosts a number of week-long and shorter conferences which make use of the Oceanic Hotel, Gosport House, the over 200-year-old chapel, and several buildings dating back to the original village. Short-term day visitors are also welcomed, although that may depend on the boat schedule. This is also a popular destination for sailboats wishing to tie up overnight in Gosport harbor.

== Smuttynose and Malaga Islands ==
Smuttynose Island, at 25 acres (10 ha), is the third-largest island. It is allegedly the site of Blackbeard's honeymoon, later for the shipwreck of the Spanish ship Sagunto in 1813, and then for the notorious 1873 murders of two young women. The latter is recalled in the story, "A Memorable Murder", by Celia Thaxter, in the 1997 novel, The Weight of Water, by Anita Shreve (and in the 2000 film), and in the song, "The Ballad of Louis Wagner" by John Perrault. There are two small houses on the island. One of them, the Samuel Haley house, was once believed to be the oldest structure in the state of Maine. Smuttynose is not populated today, but the Stewards of Smuttynose Island, a group consisting of volunteer individuals and families, participate in the care and upkeep of the two historic dwellings and grounds of the island.

Malaga Island is a diminutive island just to the west of Smuttynose, connected to it by a breakwater. The original breakwater was built around 1820 by Captain Samuel Haley, who is reputed to have paid for its construction with proceeds from four bars of pirate silver that he found under a flat rock on the island.

== White and Seavey Islands ==
White Island and Seavey Island are located at the southern end of the Isles of Shoals, within the borders of the town of Rye, New Hampshire. During low tide, the two islands are connected by a land bridge.

White Island is dominated by Isles of Shoals Light, now automated, and the keeper's house. The lighthouse, one of two on the New Hampshire coast, and associated buildings are now owned by the state of New Hampshire. The island hosts a coastal weather station which frequently records sustained hurricane-force winds from Nor'easter coastal storms in the winter, due to the exposed nature of the island. The lighthouse tower was restored in 2005 as the result of the efforts of a group of seventh graders in nearby North Hampton, known as the Lighthouse Kids (a chapter of the American Lighthouse Foundation). Poet Celia Thaxter grew up on this island before moving to Smuttynose Island and eventually Appledore Island.

Seavey Island has been the site of a tern restoration project conducted by the Audubon Society of New Hampshire in recent years.

== Other islands ==
Lunging, Duck, and Cedar islands are also part of the Isles of Shoals. Lunging, on the New Hampshire side of the border, formerly Londoner's Island, was the site of an early trading post for codfish. Today it is privately owned.

Duck and Cedar are islands on the Maine side. Duck Island lies about 1 mile (1.6 km) to the north and once was used as a bombing range for the US Navy. It was sold by the Star Island Corporation to Maine Coast Heritage Trust in 2002, and was transferred to the U.S. Fish and Wildlife Service in 2003. It is kept as a wildlife sanctuary. It is home to a seal colony and has never supported a human population.

Cedar Island is connected by breakwaters to both Smuttynose Island and Star Island and is privately owned.

== Gallery ==
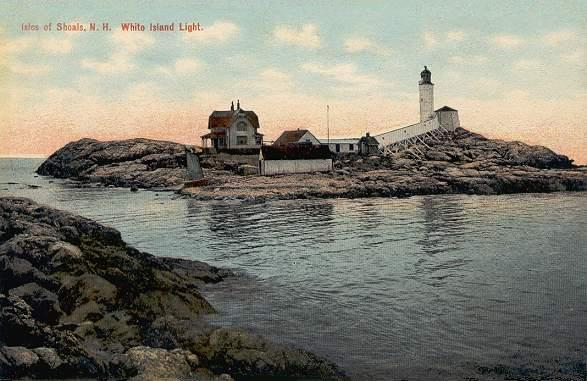
White Island Light, c. 1910

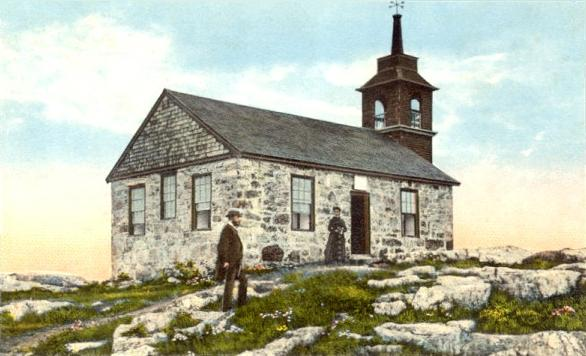
Gosport Chapel, 1905

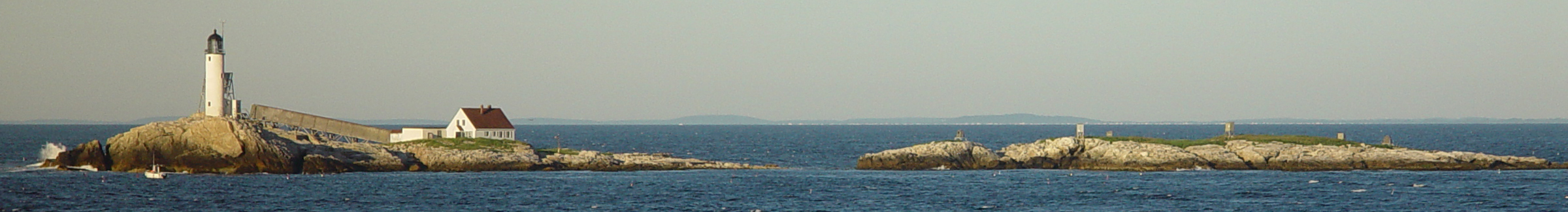
White Island (left) and Seavey Island (right) at high tide, 2006

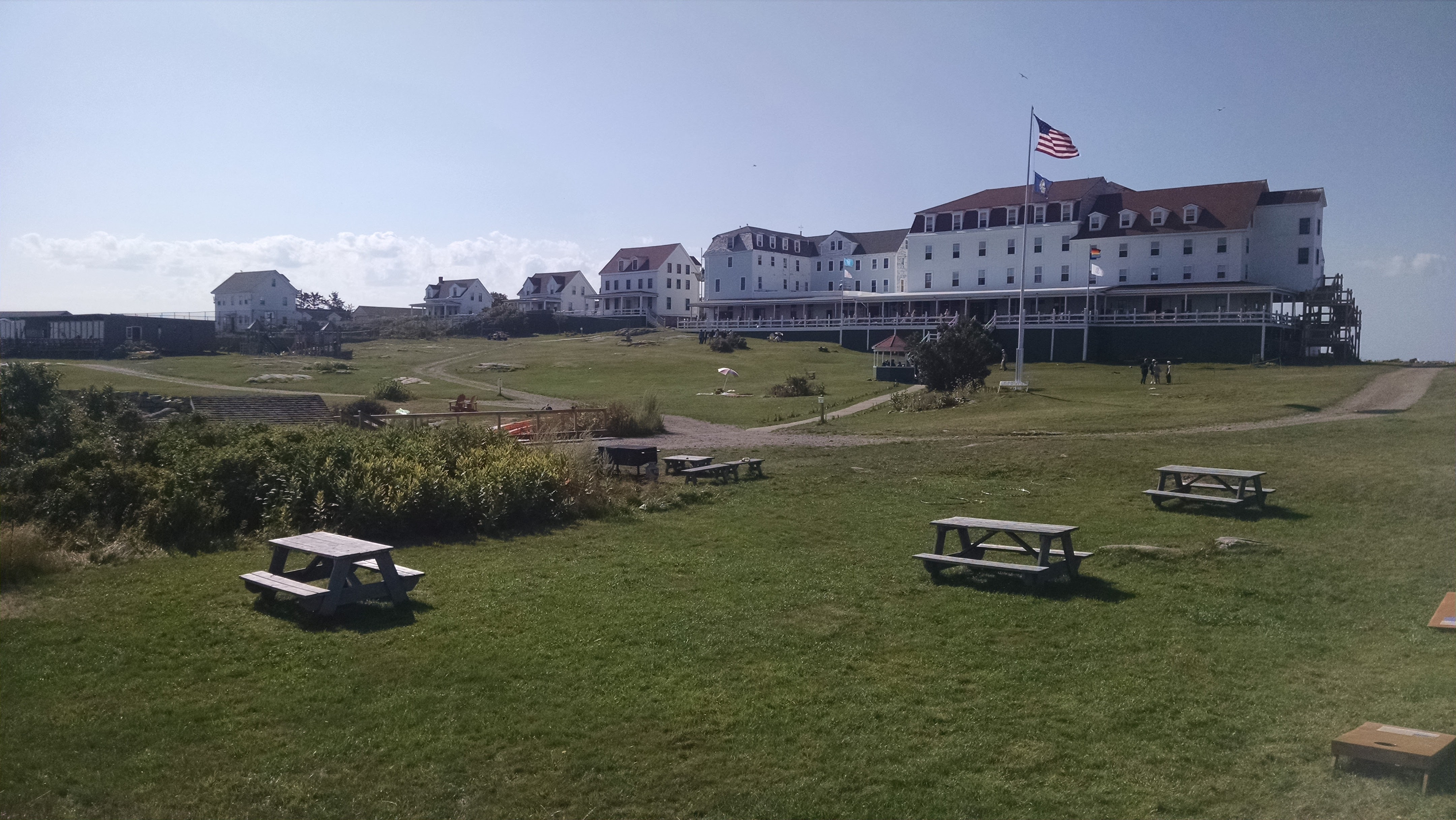
Oceanic Hotel on Star Island, 2017

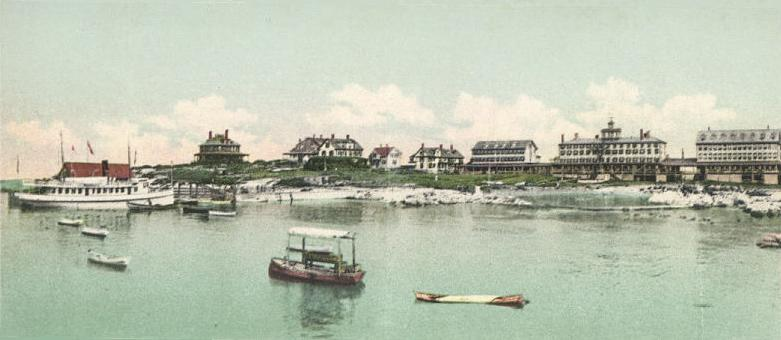
The Appledore House, 1901

== See also ==
- National Register of Historic Places listings in York County, Maine
- National Register of Historic Places listings in Rockingham County, New Hampshire
- New Hampshire Historical Marker No. 18, located in Rye Harbor State Park
- Tucke Monument, located on Star Island
