= Coast Scene, Isles of Shoals =

Painting by Childe Hassam

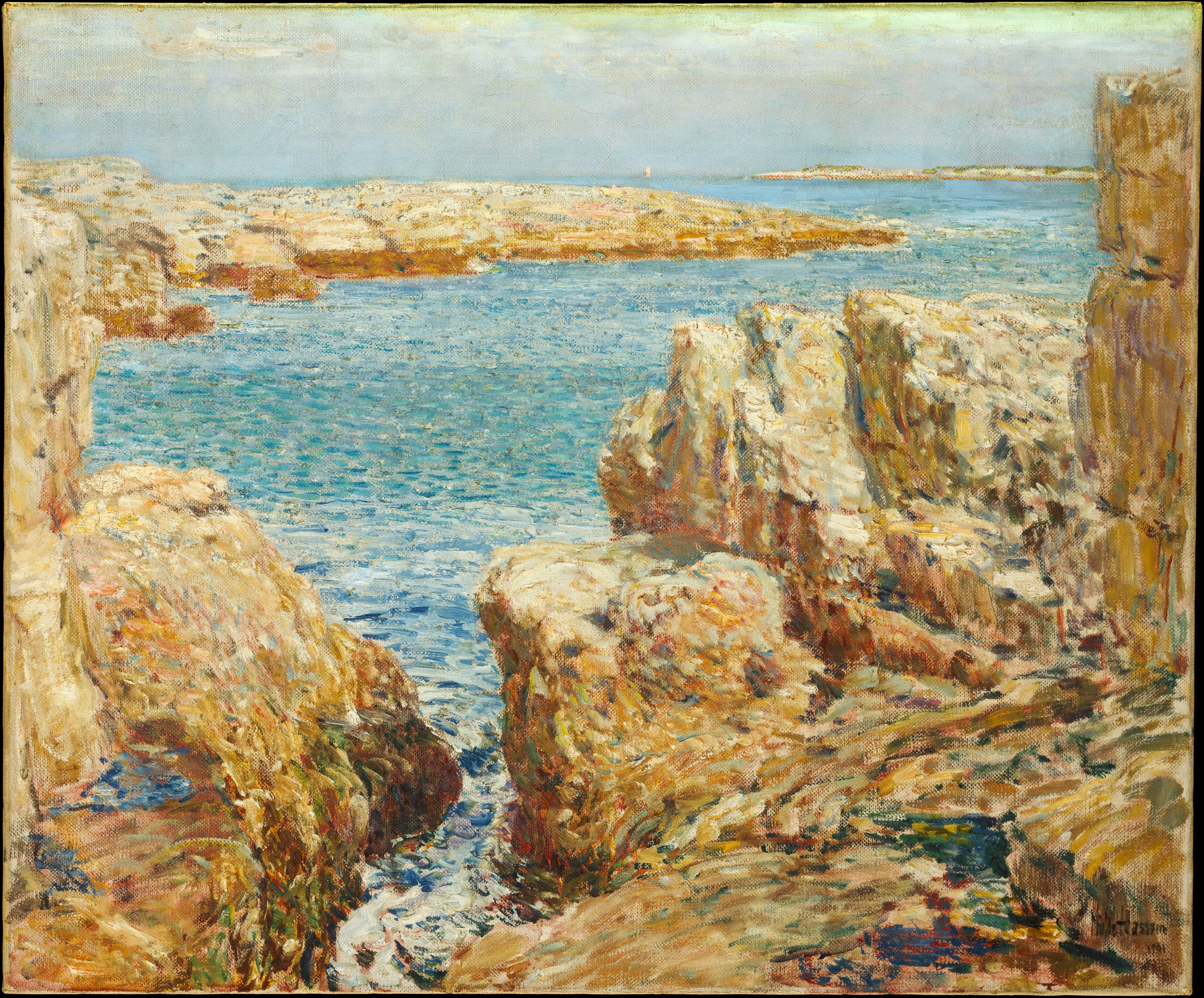
- Artist: Childe Hassam
- Year: 1901
- Medium: Oil on canvas
- Dimensions: 63.2 cm × 76.5 cm (24.9 in × 30.1 in)
- Location: Metropolitan Museum of Art; New York
- Accession: 09.72.6

Coast Scene, Isles of Shoals is a 1901 painting by the American Impressionist painter Childe Hassam, which is in the collection of the Metropolitan Museum of Art.

Done in oil on canvas in luminous colors, the painting depicts the remote Isles of Shoals off the rocky shoreline of New England, a favorite haunt of Childe Hassam at the end of the 19th century and where he painted a series of similar coastal scenes.

The painting is accompanied at the Metropolitan Museum of Art by Surf, Isles of Shoals, a similar work by Hassam.
