= The Water Garden (Childe Hassam) =

Painting by Childe Hassam

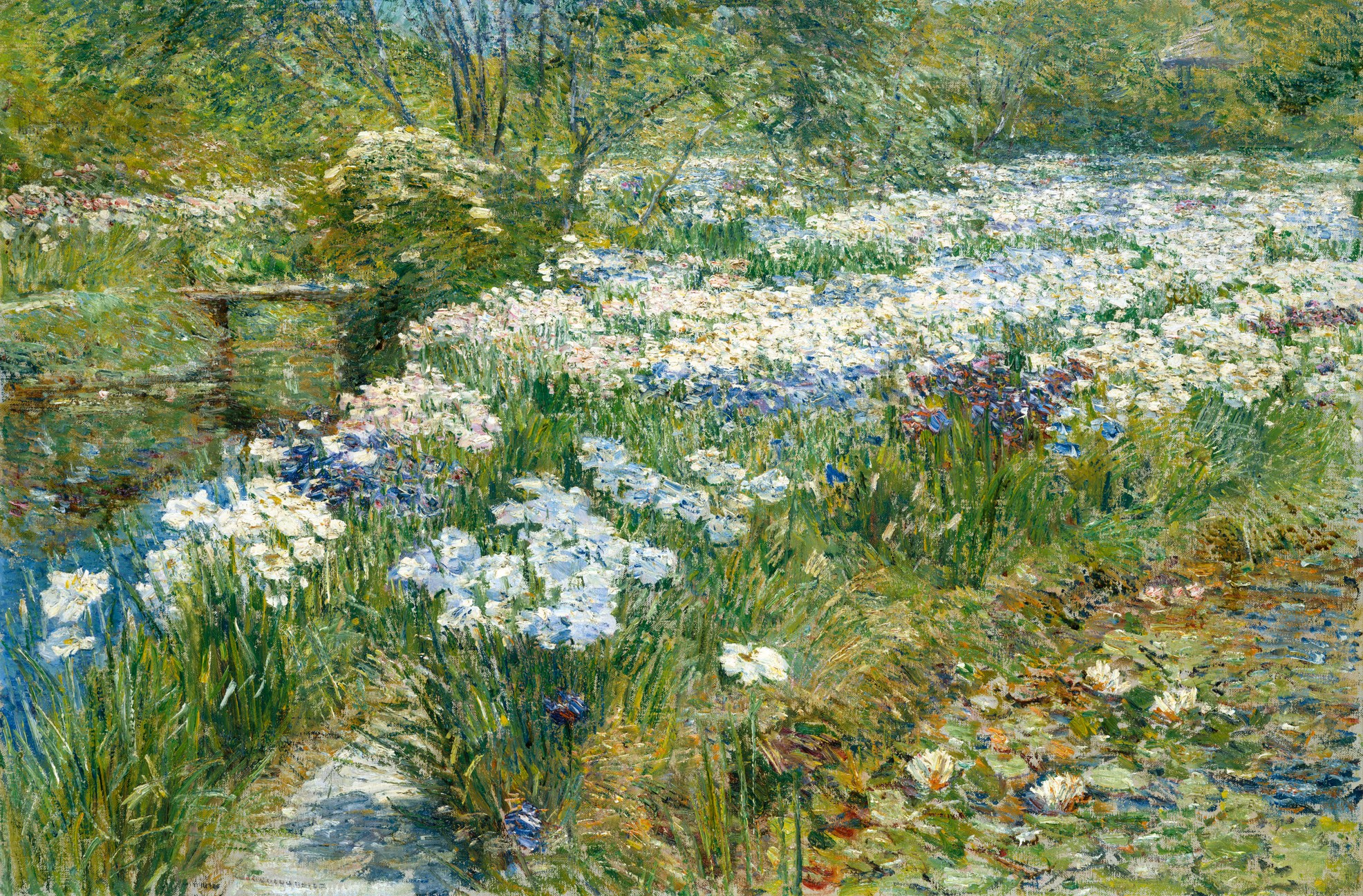
- Artist: Childe Hassam
- Year: 1909
- Medium: Oil on canvas
- Dimensions: 61 cm × 91.4 cm (24 in × 36.0 in)
- Location: Metropolitan Museum of Art; New York

The Water Garden is a 1909 painting by the American Impressionist painter Childe Hassam. Done in oil on canvas, the painting is in the Metropolitan Museum of Art in New York.

== Description ==
The painting depicts a vivacious patch of flowers set on a flat field of grass. This seemingly flat plain is pockmarked with shallow ponds that have been grown-over with aquatic plants. The painting has been noted for being heavily inflected on by Post-Impressionist artistic thought. According to the Metropolitan Museum of Art's description of the painting, Hassam's work was likely painted in East Hampton, where the artist spent his final years.
