= Winter in Union Square =

Painting by Childe Hassam

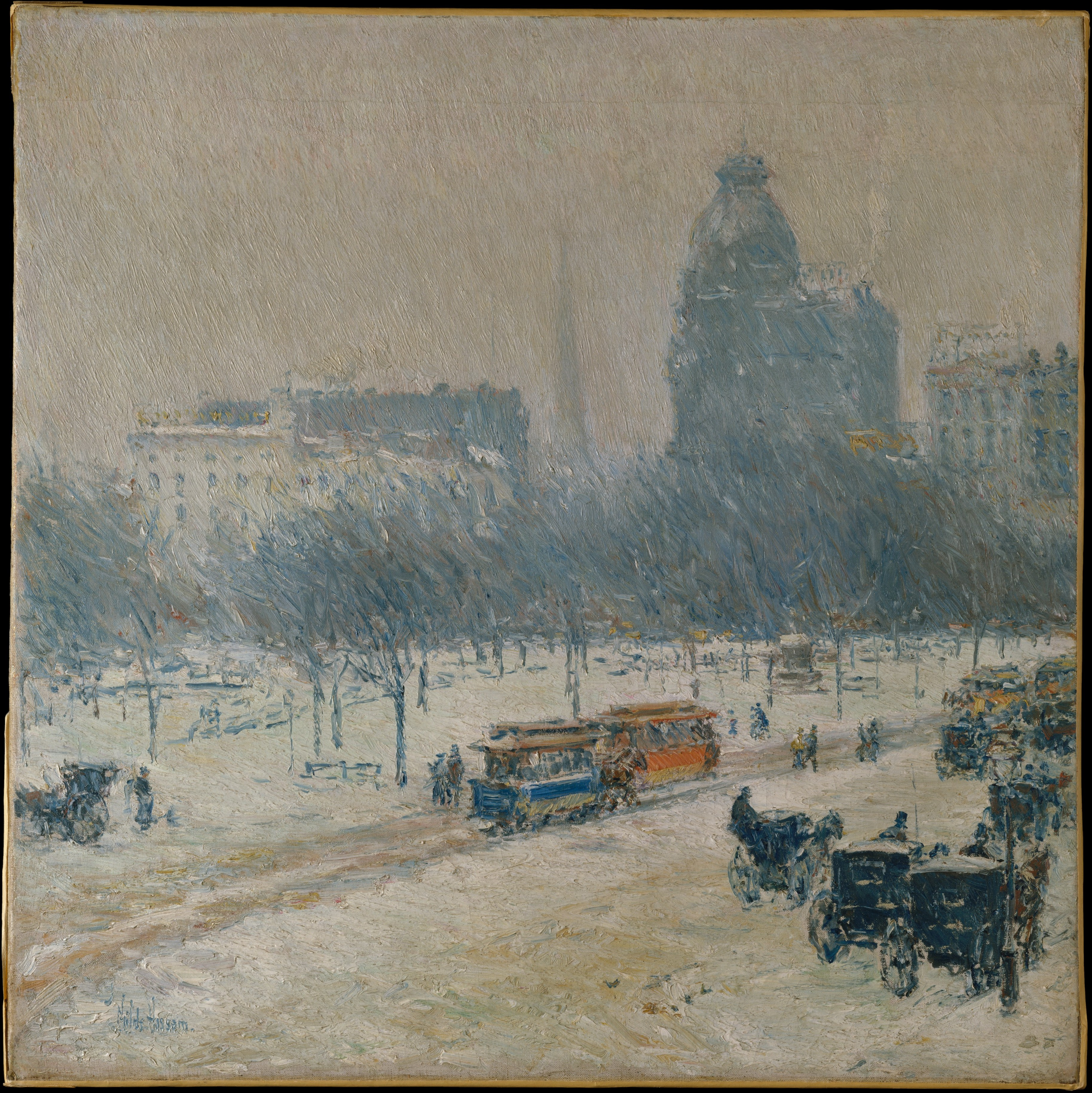
- Artist: Childe Hassam
- Year: 1889–90
- Medium: Oil on canvas
- Dimensions: 46.4 cm × 45.7 cm (18.3 in × 18.0 in)
- Location: Metropolitan Museum of Art; New York

Winter in Union Square is a late 19th-century painting by American artist Childe Hassam. Done in oil on canvas, the painting depicts Union Square in New York City during a winter snowstorm. The painting is in the collection of the Metropolitan Museum of Art.

== Description ==
The work was painted by Hassam from a vantage point on 17th Street, looking out over Union Square. The painting is done in Hassam's signature form of impressionism, and covers one of his favorite subjects; normally-crowded hubs of activity during the wintertime.
