= Broadway and 42nd Street (Metropolitan Museum of Art) =

Painting by Childe Hassam

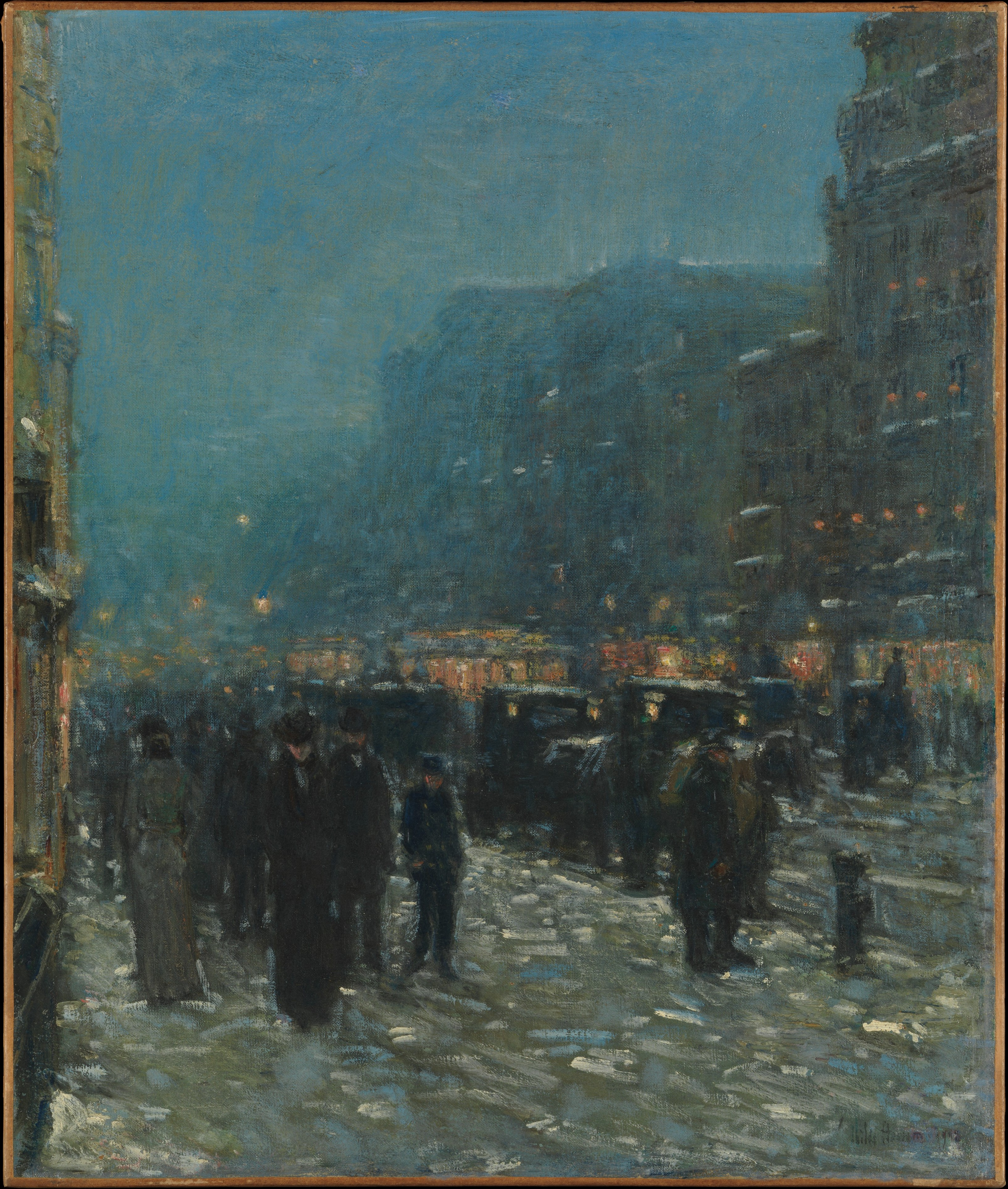
- Artist: Childe Hassam
- Year: 1902
- Medium: Oil on canvas
- Dimensions: 66 cm × 55.9 cm (26 in × 22.0 in)
- Location: Metropolitan Museum of Art; New York
- Accession: 67.187.128

Broadway and 42nd Street is a 1902 painting by the American Impressionist painter Childe Hassam. It is part of the collection of the Metropolitan Museum of Art.

Done in oil on canvas, the cityscape painting depicts the area around Times Square (then known as Longacre Square) in New York City at the intersection of Broadway and 42nd Street.

A winter scene in the evening gloom, Hassam portrays the busy cross-streets with atmospheric effect highlighted by the glow of electric light from the then new trolley cars.
