= Surf, Isles of Shoals =

1913 painting by Childe Hassam

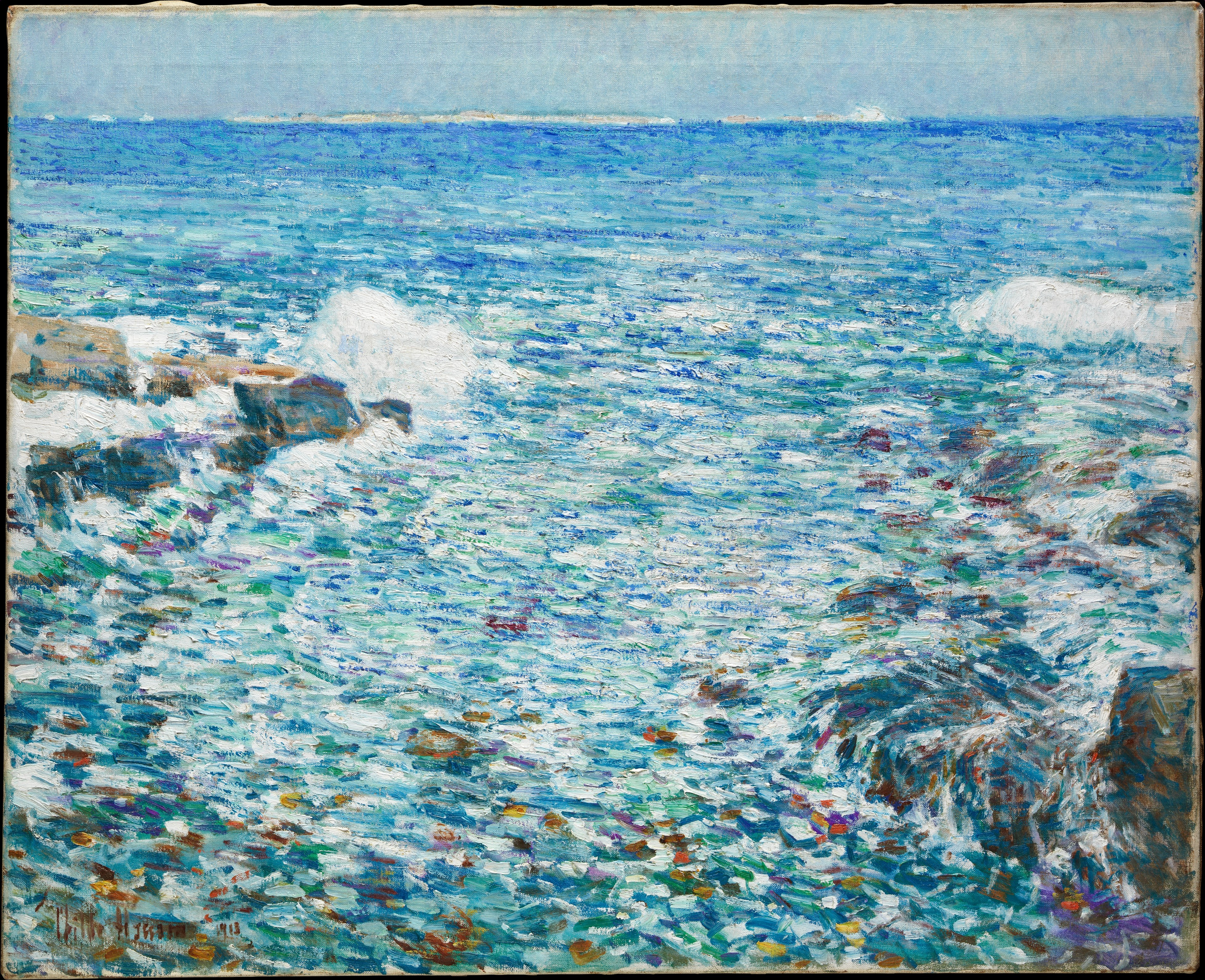
- Artist: Childe Hassam
- Year: 1913
- Medium: Oil on canvas
- Dimensions: 89.5 cm × 71.8 cm (35.2 in × 28.3 in)
- Location: Metropolitan Museum of Art; New York

Surf, Isles of Shoals is a 1913 painting by the American Impressionist painter Childe Hassam. Done in oil on canvas, the work depicts the rugged New England shoreline near Portsmouth, New Hampshire. The painting is currently in the collection of the Metropolitan Museum of Art.

== See also ==
- July Fourteenth, Rue Daunou, 1910 - another work by Hassam in the collection of the Metropolitan Museum of Art
