= On the Thames (Frank Myers Boggs) =

1883 painting by Frank Myers Boggs

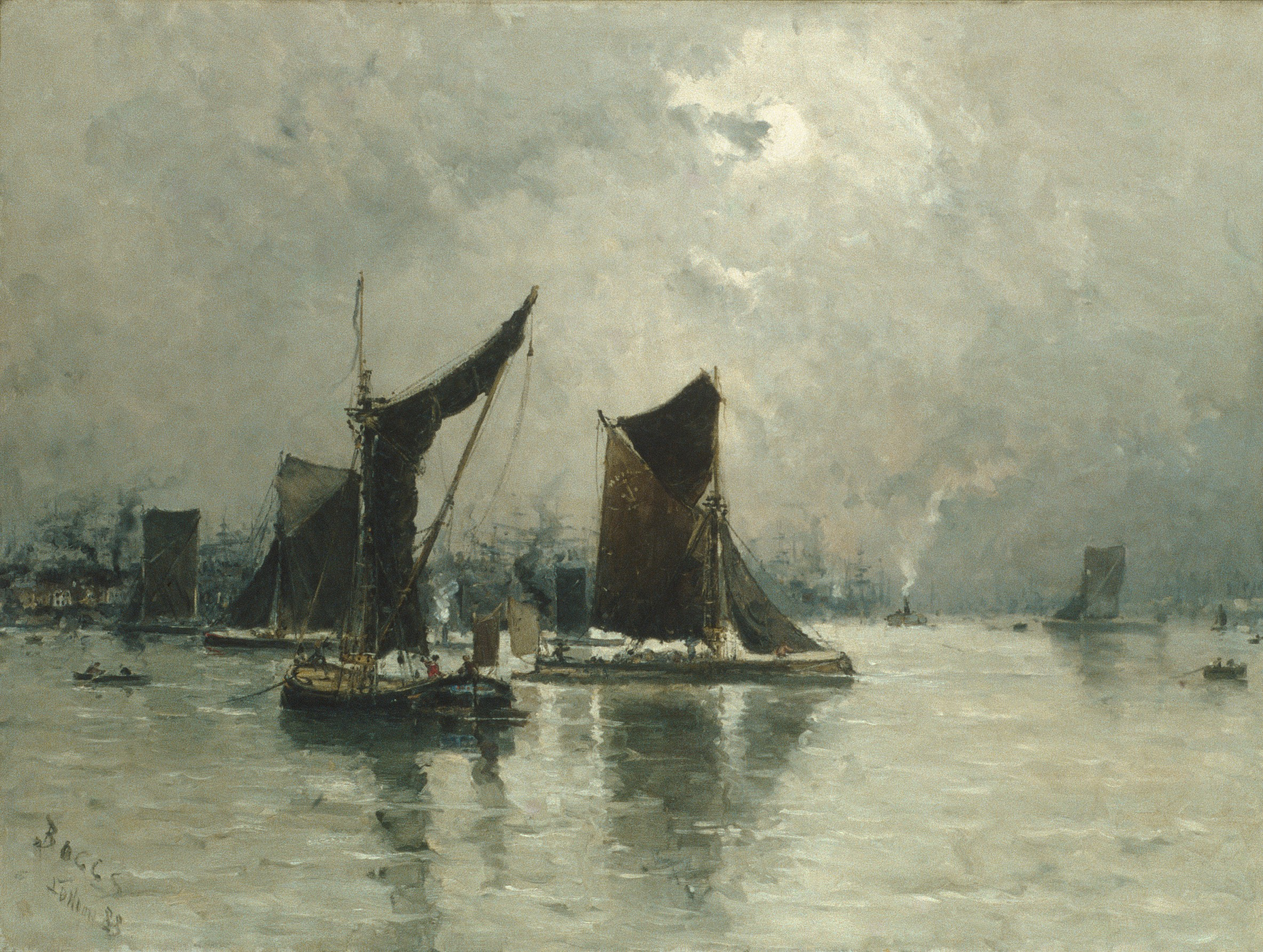
- Artist: Frank Myers Boggs
- Year: 1883
- Medium: Oil on canvas
- Dimensions: 98.4 cm × 130.8 cm (38.7 in × 51.5 in)
- Location: Metropolitan Museum of Art; New York City

On the Thames is a late 19th-century oil painting by American artist Frank Myers Boggs. Done in oil on canvas, the work was one of numerous paintings of the River Thames produced by Boggs, who operated an art studio on the river's bank in London. The painting is currently in the collection of the Metropolitan Museum of Art.
