= Frank Myers Boggs =

American-born French painter

Frank Myers Boggs (December 6, 1855 in Springfield, Ohio- 1926) was an American-born French painter. He became a naturalized French citizen in 1923, and settled in Montmartre, Paris. His work is in the collections of the Jule Collins Smith Museum of Fine Art at Auburn University, the Metropolitan Museum of Art and the Van Gogh Museum.

He studied in the École des Beaux-Arts, and was a pupil of Jean-Léon Gérôme.

Harbor Scene.

== List of Works ==
- On the Thames
- Paris, les Quais avec le Louvre
