= July Fourteenth, Rue Daunou, 1910 =

Painting by Childe Hassam

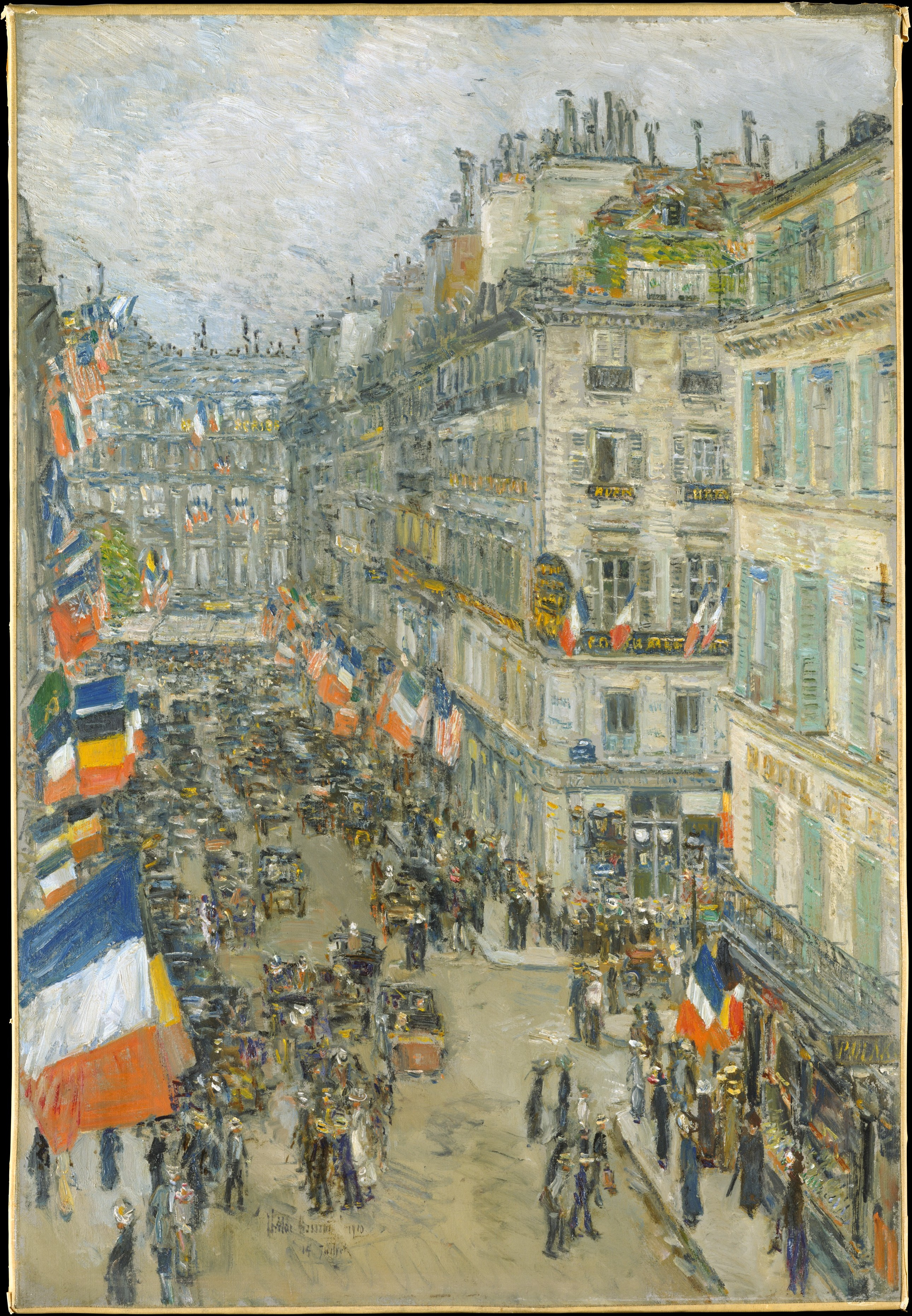
- Artist: Childe Hassam
- Year: 1910
- Medium: Oil on canvas
- Dimensions: 74 cm × 50.5 cm (29 in × 19.9 in)
- Location: Metropolitan Museum of Art; New York
- Accession: 29.86

July Fourteenth, Rue Daunou, 1910 is an early-20th-century painting by American impressionist Childe Hassam. Done in oil on canvas, the painting depicts the celebration of Bastille Day in Paris. It is now in the Metropolitan Museum of Art.

== Description ==
July Fourteenth, Rue Daunou, 1910 depicts the celebration of Bastille Day from the artist's viewpoint on top of the Hôtel l’Empire in Paris. The street below is thronged with automobiles and people, while the flags of France, Belgium, and the United States are being flown on various buildings. The Metropolitan Museum of Art considers the painting to be a precursor to Hassam's famous Flag Series.
