= Childe Hassam =

American painter (1859–1935)

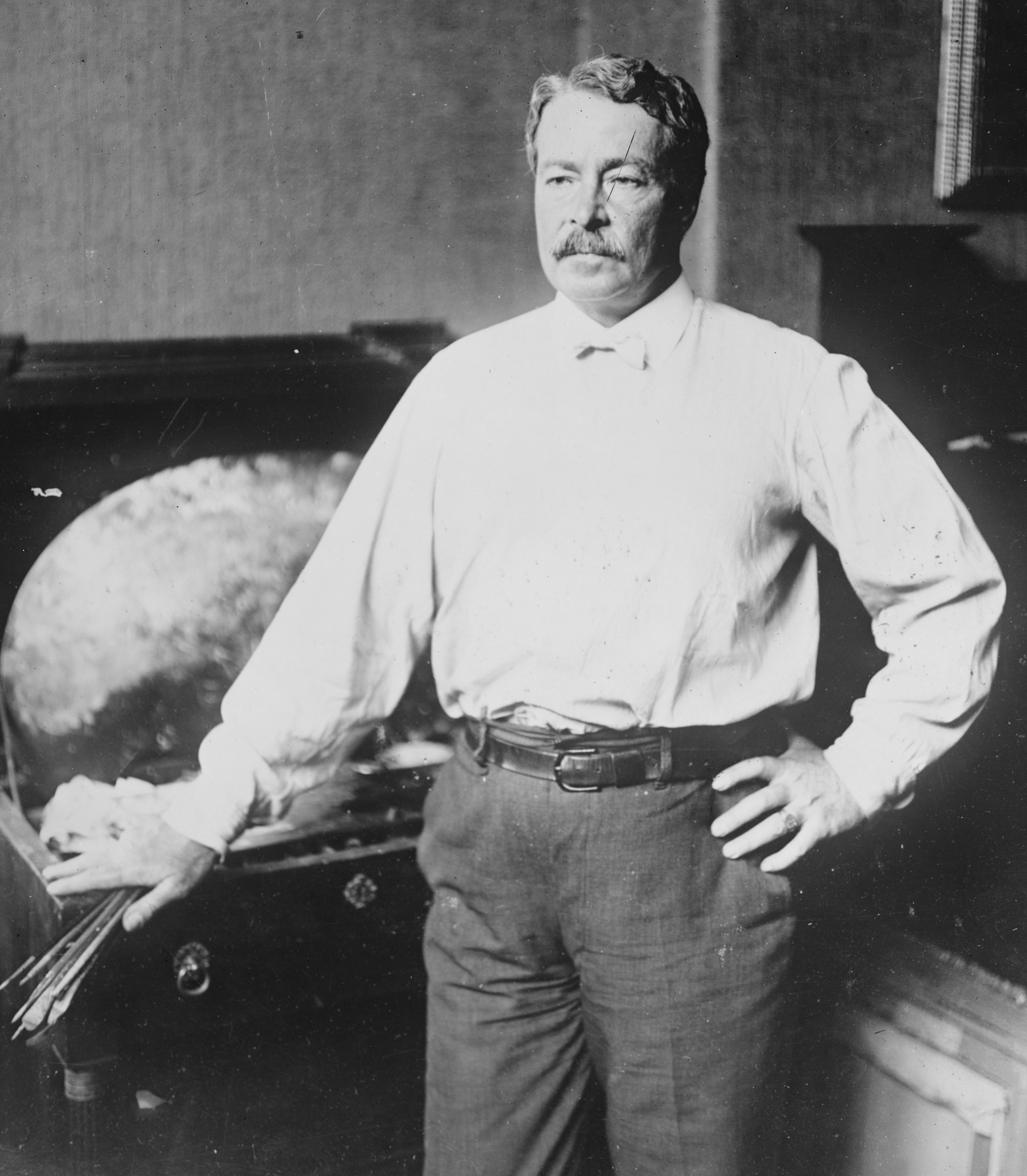
- Born: Frederick Childe Hassam; October 17, 1859; Dorchester, Boston, Massachusetts, U.S.
- Died: August 27, 1935 (aged 75); East Hampton, New York, U.S.
- Education: Académie Julian
- Known for: Painting
- Movement: American Impressionism
- Awards: Bronze Medal, Exposition Universale, Paris, 1889; Gold Medal (Lifetime Achievement), Pennsylvania Academy of the Fine Arts, 1920

Frederick Childe Hassam (/ˈtʃaɪld ˈhæsəm/; October 17, 1859 – August 27, 1935) was an American Impressionist painter, noted for his urban and coastal scenes. Along with Mary Cassatt and John Henry Twachtman, Hassam was instrumental in promulgating Impressionism to American collectors, dealers, and museums. He produced over 3,000 paintings, oils, watercolors, etchings, and lithographs over the course of his career, and was an influential American artist of the early 20th century.

== Early years ==
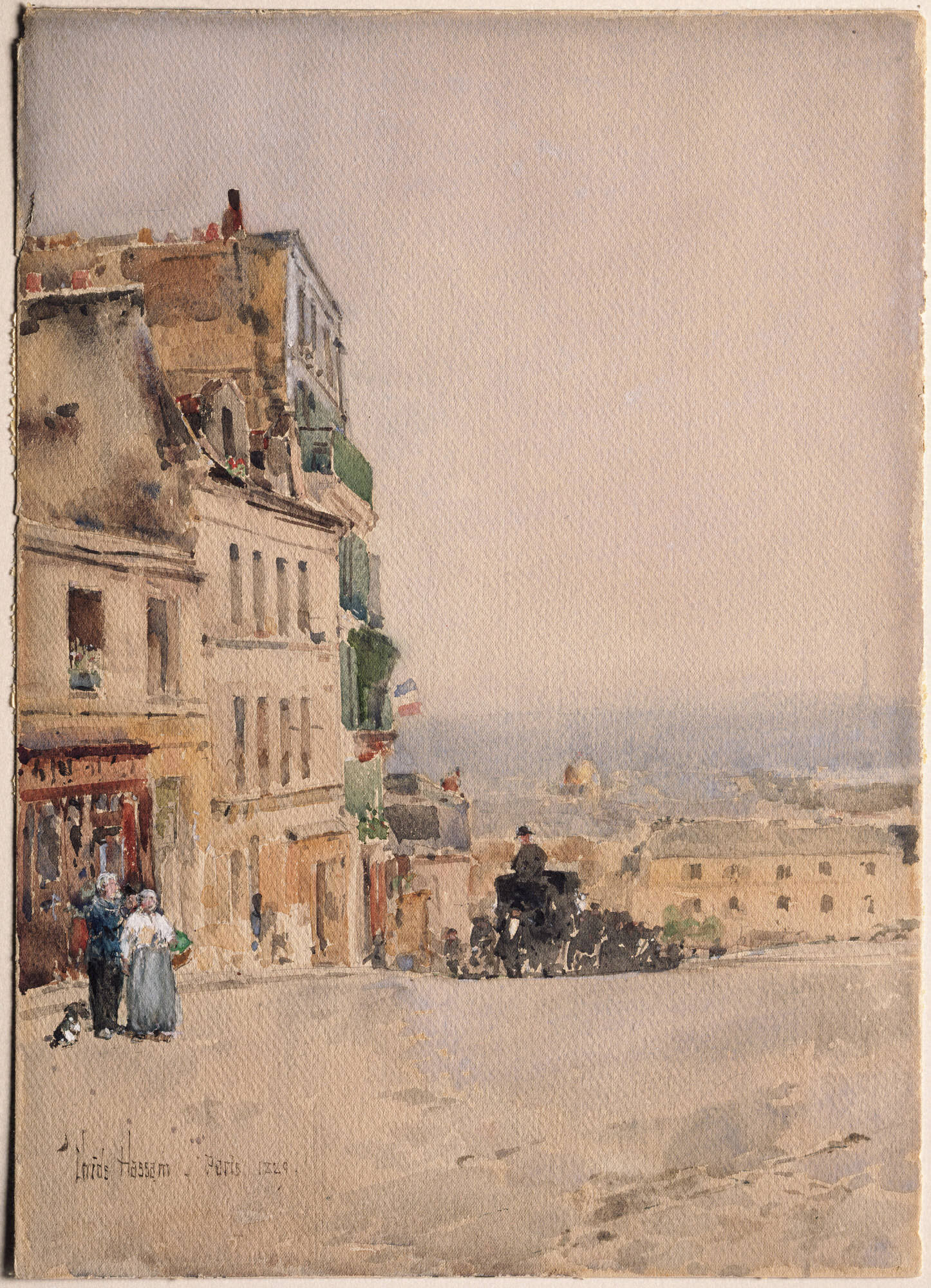
View in Montmartre, Paris, 1889, Princeton University Art Museum

Hassam was known to all as "Childe" (pronounced like child), a name taken from his uncle. Hassam was born in the family home on Olney Street on Meeting House Hill in the Dorchester neighborhood of Boston, on October 17, 1859. His father, Frederick Fitch Hassam (1825–1880), was a moderately successful cutlery businessman with a large collection of art and antiques. He descended from a long line of New Englanders. His mother, Rosa Delia Hawthorne (1832–1880), a native of Maine, shared an ancestor with American novelist Nathaniel Hawthorne. His father claimed descent from a seventeenth-century English immigrant whose name, Horsham, had been morphed over time to Hassam. With his dark complexion and heavily lidded eyes, many took Childe Hassam to be of Middle Eastern descent—speculation that he enjoyed stoking. In the mid-1880s, he took to painting an Islamic-appearing crescent moon (which eventually degenerated into only a slash) next to his signature, and he adopted the nickname "Muley" (from the Arabic "Mawla", Lord or Master), invoking Muley Abul Hassan, a fifteenth-century ruler of Granada whose life was fictionalized in Washington Irving's novel Tales of the Alhambra.

Hassam demonstrated an early interest in art. He had his first lessons in drawing and watercolor while attending The Mather School, but his parents took little notice of his nascent talent.

As a child, Hassam excelled at boxing and swimming at Dorchester High School. A disastrous fire in November 1872 wiped out much of Boston's commercial district, including his father's business. Hassam left high school after two years (at age 17), and by 1880 his family had moved to nearby Hyde Park. Despite his uncle's offer to pay for a Harvard education, Hassam preferred to help support his family by working. His father arranged a job in the accounting department of publisher Little, Brown & Company. During that time, Hassam studied the art of wood engraving and found employment with engraver George Johnson. He quickly proved an adept "draughtsman" and produced designs for commercial engravings such as letterheads and newspapers. Beginning to paint artistically, his preferred medium was watercolor, mostly outdoor studies, and around 1879 began creating his earliest oils.

== Career ==
=== Early career ===
==== 1880s ====
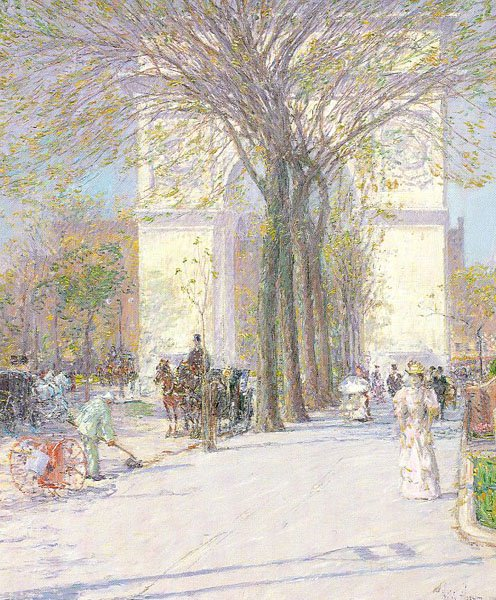
Washington Arch, in Washington Square Park, c. 1893

In 1882, Hassam became a free-lance illustrator (known as a "black-and-white man" in the trade), and established his first studio. He specialized in illustrating children's stories for magazines such as Harper's Weekly, Scribner's Monthly, and The Century. He continued to develop his technique while attending drawing classes at the Lowell Institute and at the Boston Art Club, where he took life painting classes.

By 1883, Hassam had exhibited watercolors in his first solo exhibition at the Williams and Everett Gallery in Boston. The following year, his friend Celia Thaxter convinced him to drop his first name and thereafter he was known as "Childe Hassam". He also began to add a crescent symbol in front of his signature, the meaning of which remains speculative, possibly an allusion to his penchant for implying Middle Eastern or Turkish origins.

Having had relatively little formal art training, Hassam was advised by his friend and fellow Boston Art Club member Edmund H. Garrett to join him on a two-month "study trip" to Europe during the summer of 1883. They traveled throughout the United Kingdom, the Netherlands, France, Italy, Switzerland, and Spain, studying the Old Masters together and creating watercolors of the European countryside. Hassam was particularly impressed with the watercolors of J. M. W. Turner. Sixty-seven of the watercolors that Hassam painted on this trip formed the basis of his second exhibition in 1884. During this period, Hassam taught at the Cowles Art School. He also joined the "Paint and Clay Club", expanding his contacts in the art community, which included prominent critics and "the readiest and smartest of our younger generation of artists, illustrators, sculptors, and decorators—the nearest thing to Bohemia that Boston can boast." Friends found him to be energetic, robust, outgoing, and unassuming, capable of self-mockery and considerate acts, but he could be argumentative and wickedly witty against those in the art community who opposed him. Hassam was particularly influenced by the circle of William Morris Hunt, who like the great French landscape painter Jean-Baptiste-Camille Corot, emphasized the Barbizon tradition of working directly from nature. He absorbed their credo that "atmosphere and light are the great things to work for in landscape painting." In 1885, a noted critic, in part responding to Hassam's early oil painting A Back Road (1884), stated that "the Boston taste for landscape painting, founded on this sound French school, is the one vital, positive, productive, and distinctive tendency among our artists today...the truth is poetry enough for these radicals of the new school. It is a healthy, manly muscular kind of art."

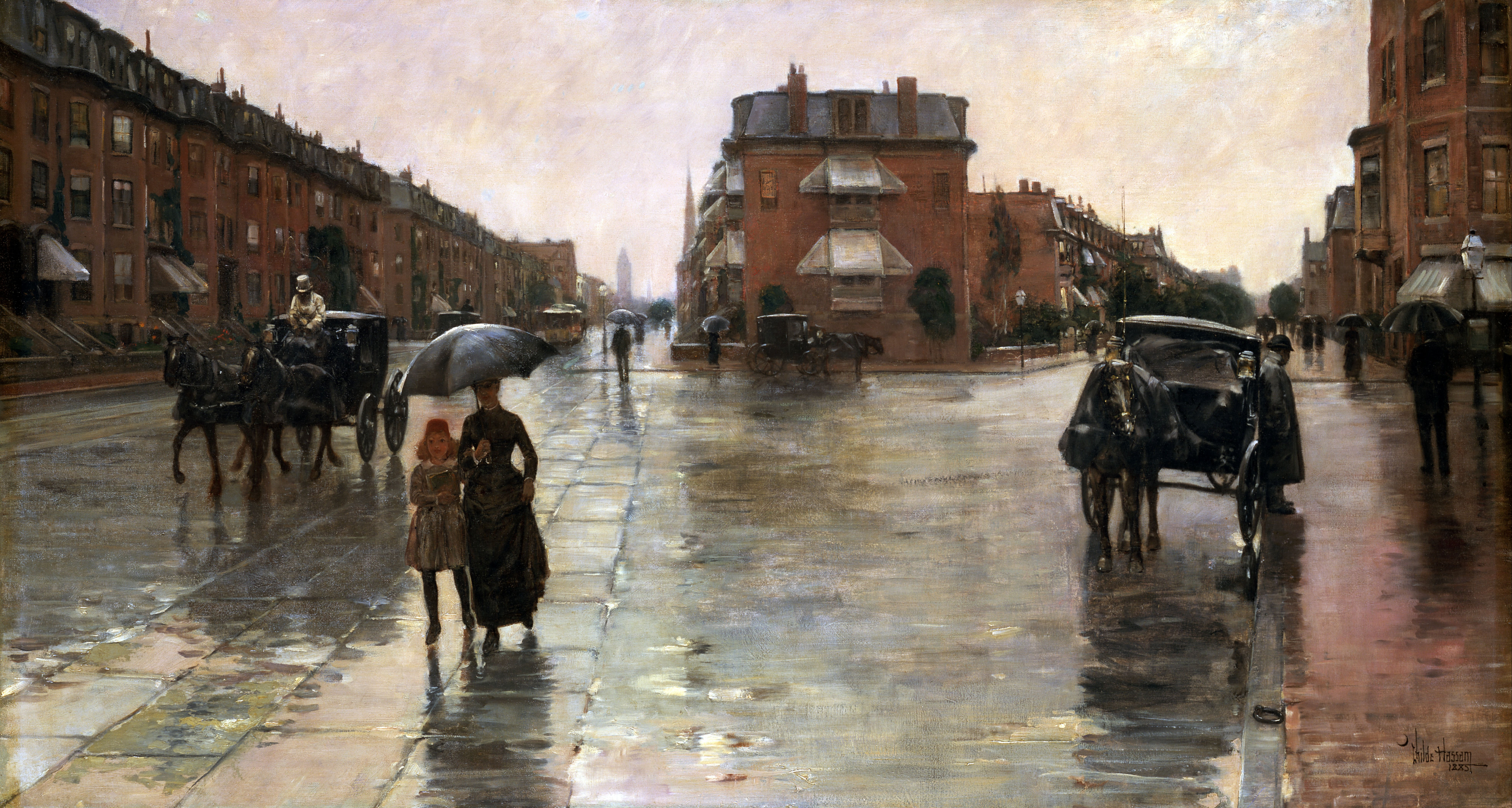
Rainy Day, Boston (1885), Toledo Museum of Art in Ohio, with "an uncanny resemblance" to Caillebotte's 1877 Paris Street; Rainy Day

In February 1884, after a courtship of several years, Hassam married Kathleen Maude (or Maud) Doane (born 1861), a family friend. Throughout their life together, she ran the household, arranged travel, and attended to other domestic tasks, but little is known about their private life. By the mid-1880s, Hassam began painting cityscapes; Boston Common at Twilight (1885) was of his first. He joined a few other progressive American artists who were taking to heart the advice of French academic master Jean-Léon Gérôme, who abandoned his traditional subject matter and told his American peers, "Look around you and paint what you see. Forget the Beaux-Arts and the models and render the intense life which surrounds you and be assured that the Brooklyn Bridge is worth the Colosseum of Rome and that modern America is as fine as the bric-a-brac of antiquity." However, one Boston critic firmly rejected Hassam's choice of urban subject matter as "very pleasant, but not art." Although he had shown steady improvement in his oil painting, his watercolors continued provided consistent financial success. He returned with his wife to Paris where in 1886 they were able to engage a well-located apartment/studio with a maid near the Place Pigalle, the center of the Parisian art community. With the exception of fellow American artist Frank Myers Boggs, they lived among the French and socialized little with other American artists studying abroad.

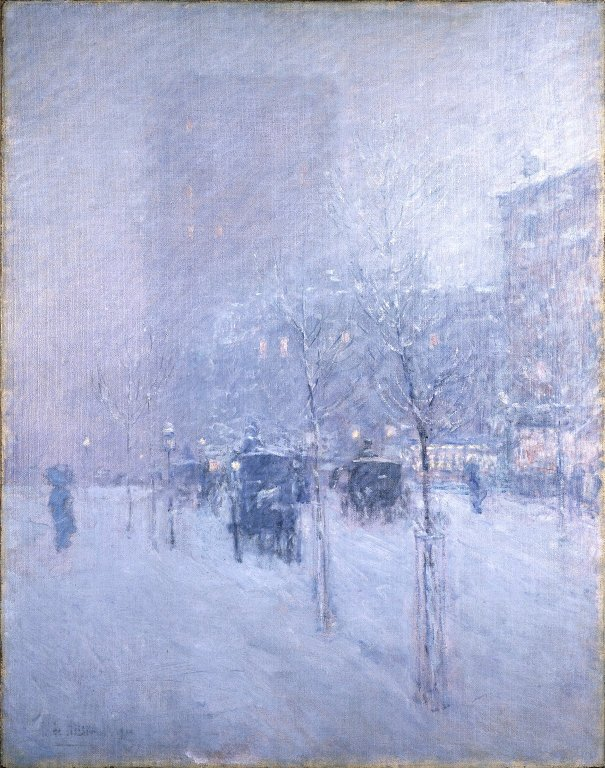
Late Afternoon, New York, Winter, c. 1900. Brooklyn Museum

Hassam had moved to France to study figure drawing and painting at the prestigious Académie Julian. He took advantage of the formal drawing classes with Gustave Boulanger and Jules Joseph Lefebvre, but quickly moved on to self-study, finding that "[t]he Julian academy is the personification of routine...[academic training] crushes all originality out of growing men. It tends to put them in a rut and it keeps them in it", preferring instead, "my own method in the same degree". His first Parisian works were street scenes, employing a mostly brown palette. He sent these works back to Boston and their sale, combined with that of older watercolors, provided him with sufficient income to sustain his stay abroad. In the autumn of 1887, Hassam painted two versions of Grand Prix Day, employing a breakthrough change of palette. In this dramatic change of technique, he was laying softer, more diffuse colors to canvas, similar to the French Impressionists, creating scenes full of light, done with freer brush strokes. He was likely inspired by French Impressionist paintings which he viewed in museums and exhibitions, though he did not meet any of the artists. Hassam eventually became one of the group of American Impressionists known as "The Ten".

The completed pictures he sent home also attracted attention. One reviewer commented: "It is refreshing to note that Mr. Hassam, in the midst of so many good, bad, and indifferent art currents, seems to be paddling his own canoe with a good deal of independence and method. When his Boston pictures of three years ago...are compared with the more recent work...it may be seen how he has progressed." Hassam contributed four paintings to the Exposition Universelle of 1889 in Paris, winning a bronze medal. At that time, he remarked on the emergence of progressive American artists who studied abroad but who did not succumb to French traditions:

The American Section...has convinced me for ever of the capability of Americans to claim a school. Inness, Whistler, Sargent and plenty of Americans just as well able to cope in their own chosen line with anything done over here...An artist should paint his own time and treat nature as he feels it, not repeat the same stupidities of his predecessors...The men who have made success today are the men who have got out of the rut.

As for the French Impressionists, he wrote "Even Claude Monet, Sisley, Pissarro and the school of extreme Impressionists do some things that are charming and that will live." Hassam was later called an "extreme Impressionist". His closest contact with a French Impressionist artist occurred when Hassam took over Renoir's former studio and found some of the painter's oil sketches left behind. "I did not know anything about Renoir or care anything about Renoir. I looked at these experiments in pure color and saw it was what I was trying to do myself."

==== 1890s ====
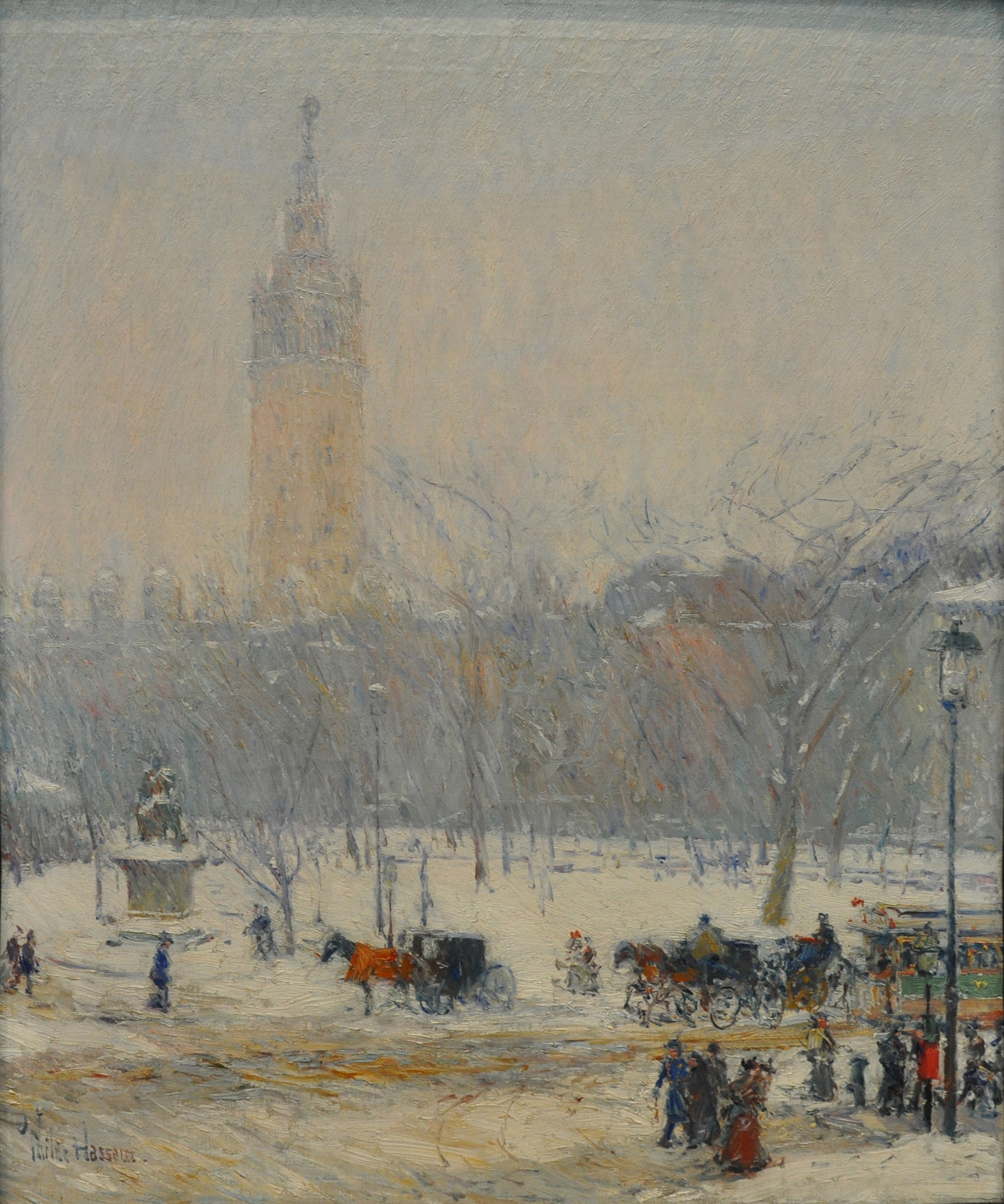
Snowstorm, Madison Square, c. 1890

The couple returned to the United States in 1889, taking residence in New York City. He resumed his studio illustration and in good weather produced landscapes out-of-doors. He found a studio apartment at Fifth Avenue and 17th Street, a view that he painted in one of his first New York oils, Fifth Avenue in Winter. The fashionable street was traveled at that time by horse-drawn carriages and trolleys. It was one of his favorite paintings and he exhibited it several times. It skillfully uses a distinctive dark palette of blacks and browns (normally considered "forbidden colors" by strict Impressionists) to create a winter urban panorama, which Le Figaro praised for its "American character". For his Washington Arch in Spring (1890), he instead demonstrated a bright pastel palette suffused with white similar to what Monet might have employed.

The sudden shift expanded his options and his range. Through the 1890s, his technique increasingly evolved toward Impressionism in both oil and watercolor, even as the movement itself was giving way to Post-Impressionism and Fauvism. During his European stay, he continued to favor street and horse scenes, avoiding some of the other favorite depictions of the Impressionists, such as opera, cabaret, theater, and boating. He also painted garden and "flower girl" scenes, some featuring his wife, including Geraniums (1888) which he presented at the Salon exhibition in 1889. He managed to exhibit at all three Salon shows during his Paris stay.

Hassam became close friends with fellow American Impressionist artists J. Alden Weir and John Henry Twachtman, whom he met through the American Water Color Society, and over the following months he made many connections in the art community through other art societies and social clubs. He contributed works from his European stay to several exhibitions and shows. Hassam enthusiastically painted the genteel urban atmosphere of New York that he encountered within walking distance of his apartment, and avoided the squalor of the lower-class neighborhoods. He proclaimed that "New York is the most beautiful city in the world. There is no boulevard in all Paris that compares to our own Fifth Avenue...the average American still fails to appreciate the beauty of his own country." He captured well-dressed men in bowler hats and top hats, fashionable women and children out and about, and horse-drawn cabs slowly making their way along crowded thoroughfares lined by commercial buildings (which were generally less than six stories high at that time). Hassam's primary focus would forever continue to be "humanity in motion". He never doubted his own artistic development and his subjects, remaining confident in his instinctual choices throughout his life.

It was through Theodore Robinson, who was working alternatively in America and France, that he, Twachtman, and Weir kept in close touch with Claude Monet, who was residing in Giverny at the time. The four Americans represented the core of American Impressionism, dedicated to painting what was real for them, what was familiar and close at hand, out-of-doors when possible, and with the immediacy of light and shadow—which though exaggerated and falsely colored at times—makes a purposeful impact or impression. The urban scene provided its own unique atmosphere and light, which Hassam found "capable of the most astounding effects" and as picturesque as any seaside scene. The challenge for the urban Impressionist, however, was that activity moved very quickly, and therefore, getting down a complete impression in oil was next to impossible. To compensate, Hassam would find a suitable location, make sketches of the components of his planned painting, then return to the studio to construct a total impression that was actually a composite of smaller scenes.

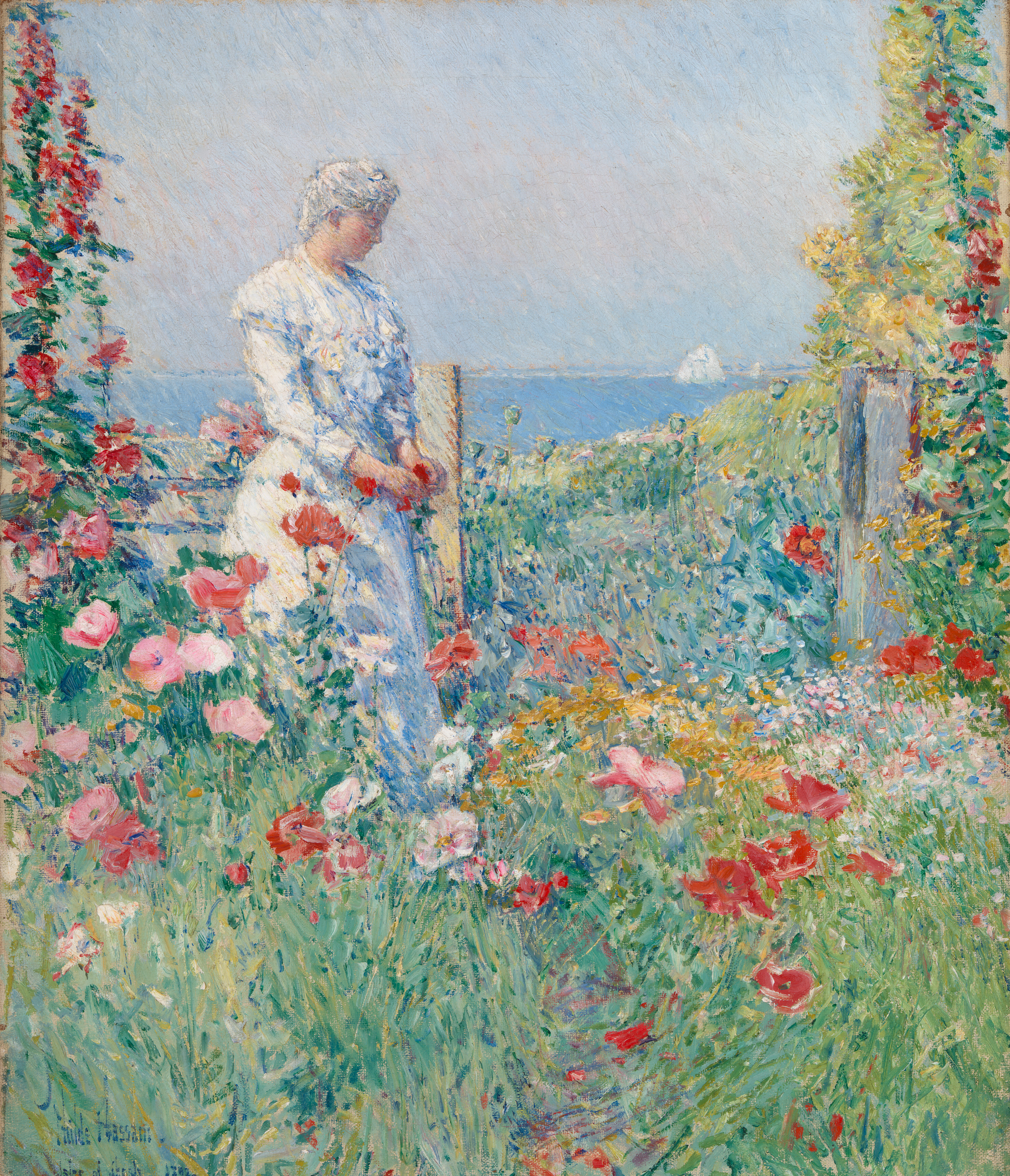
In the Garden (Celia Thaxter in Her Garden) (1892), Smithsonian American Art Museum

During the summers, he would work in a more typical Impressionist location, such as Appledore Island, the largest of the Isles of Shoals off New Hampshire, then famous for its artist colony. Social life on the island revolved around the salon of poet Celia Thaxter who hosted artists and literary figures. The group was a "jolly, refined, interesting and artistic set of people...like one large family." There Hassam recalled, "I spent some of my pleasantest summers...(and) where I met the best people in the country." Hassam's subjects for his paintings included Thaxter's flower garden, the rocky landscape, and some interior scenes rendered with his most impressionistic brush strokes to date. In Impressionist fashion, he applied his colors "perfectly clear out of the tube" to unprimed canvas without pre-mixing. Artists displayed their work in Thaxter's salon and were exposed to wealthy buyers staying on the island. Thaxter died in 1894, and in tribute Hassam painted her parlor in The Room of Flowers.

Starting in the mid-1890s, Hassam also made summer painting excursions to Gloucester, Massachusetts; Cos Cob, Connecticut; and Old Lyme, Connecticut; all of them by the sea, but each presenting unique aspects for painting. Even though his sales were good, Hassam continued to take on commercial work, including for the World's Columbian Exposition in Chicago in 1893. After a trip to Havana, Cuba, Hassam returned to New York and had his first major one-man auction show at the American Art Galleries in 1896, which featured over 200 works that spanned his entire career to date. The New York Times observed that of the "steadily increasing band of impressionists, Mr. Hassam is a priest high in the councils." Most critics were convinced that he had taken Impressionism too far, one stating that "his key of color has been rising higher and higher until it simply screeches. His impression has been growing more and more bleary-eyed." Another critic declared, "He ignores the public that dearly loves a picture." Hassam realized less than $50 per picture at the auction. Other American artists were also having a difficult time during the general economic slump of 1896. Hassam decided to return to Europe.

=== Mid-career ===
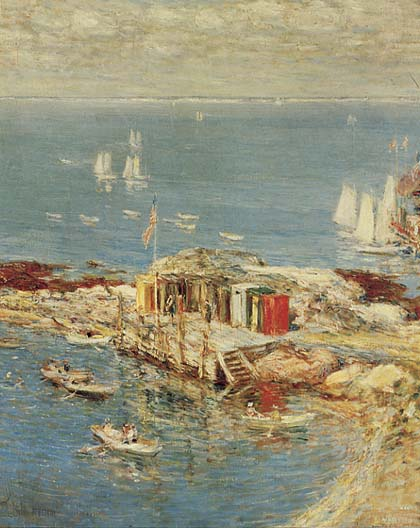
August Afternoon, Appledore, 1900

The Hassams sailed first to Naples, then to Rome and Florence. Though staying firmly in the Impressionists' corner, Hassam spent much time in galleries and churches studying the Old Masters. The Hassams arrived in Paris in the spring, and then traveled on to England. He continued producing paintings with a very light palette.

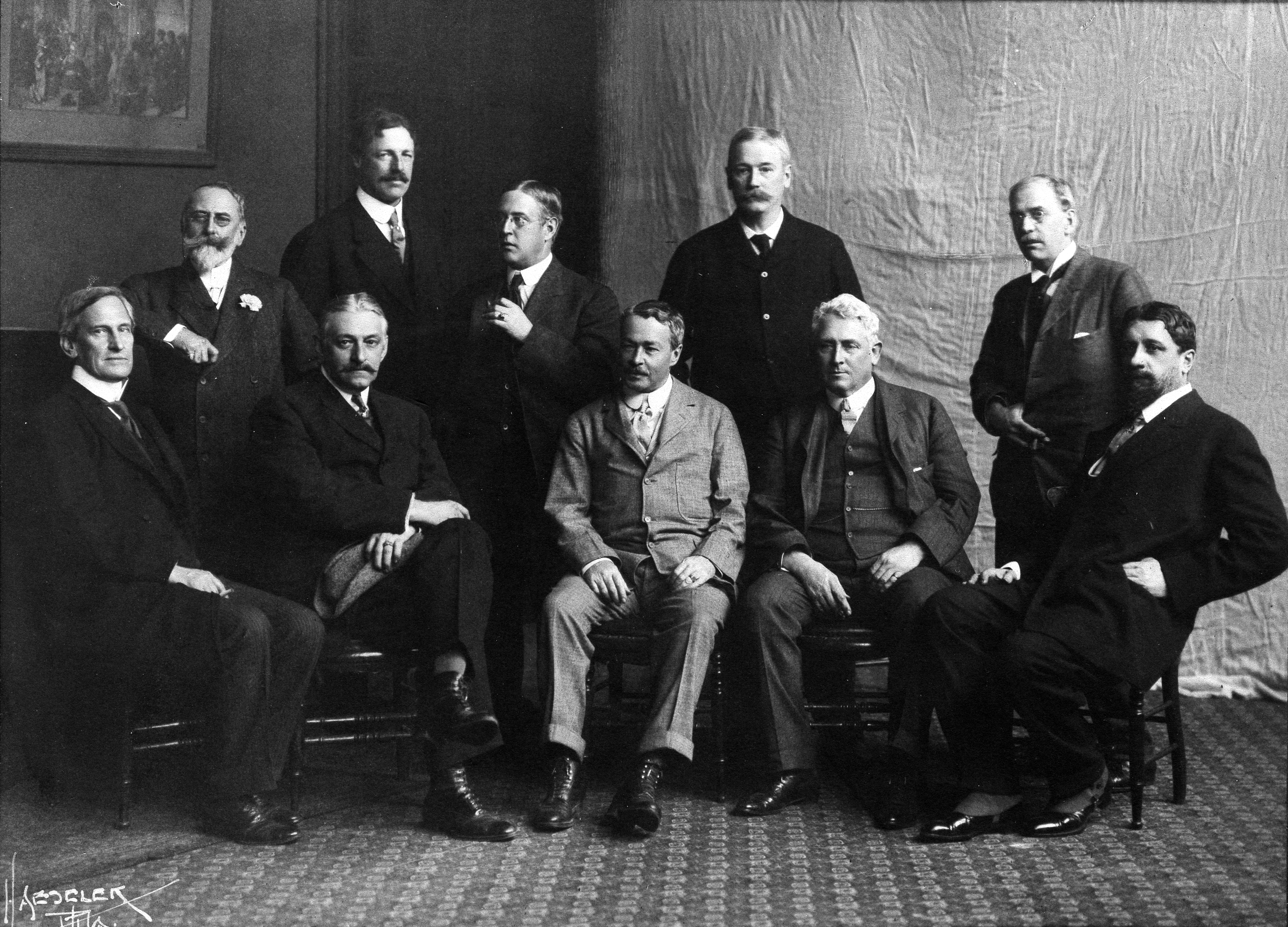
The Ten

Back in New York in 1897, Hassam took part in the secession of Impressionists from the Society of American Artists, forming a new society known as The Ten. The group was energized if not initiated by Hassam, who was among the most radical of members. Their first show at the Durand-Ruel Gallery featured seven of his new European works. Critics dismissed his new work as "experimental" and "quite incomprehensible". Though still interested in including figures in his urban paintings, his new summer works done at Gloucester Harbor, Newport, Old Lyme, and other New England locales show increasing attention to pure landscapes and buildings. His time at the Old Lyme Art Colony, beginning in 1903, caused a shift of the entire colony's output away from the muted colors of Tonalism towards American Impressionism. As his colors became paler and closer in tone to Monet's, which many viewers found unsettling and unfathomable, he was asked how he came up with a particular palette. He responded that "subjects suggest to me a color scheme and I just paint."

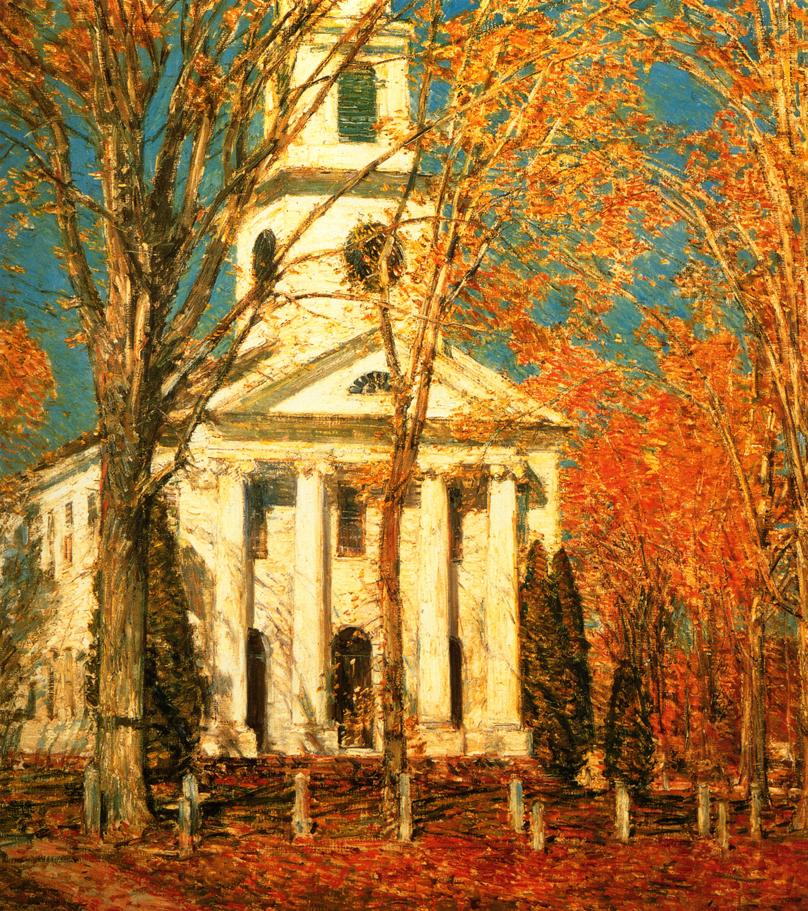
Church at Old Lyme, oil on canvas, 1905

In 1900, Hassam visited Provincetown, Massachusetts. Provincetown, once a thriving maritime community had begun to rely heavily on local tourism. In Building the Schooner, Provincetown, he uniquely captures a rare event in the community: the building of a schooner. The ship featured in Hassam's work was paid for by a Chicago millionaire and was the first large ship to be built in Provincetown in a quarter of a century.

Hassam was astute in marketing his work, and was represented by dealers and museums in several cities and abroad. Despite the critics and conservative buyers, he managed to keep selling and painting without having to resort to teaching for financial survival. A colleague described Hassam as an artist "with a keen knowledge of distribution, the tactical ability to place his work." As the new century began, some three decades after the Impressionists' first exhibitions in France, Impressionism finally gained a legitimacy in the American art community, and Hassam began to sell to major museums and receive jury awards and medals, vindicating his belief in his vision. In 1906, he was elected Academician of the National Academy of Design.

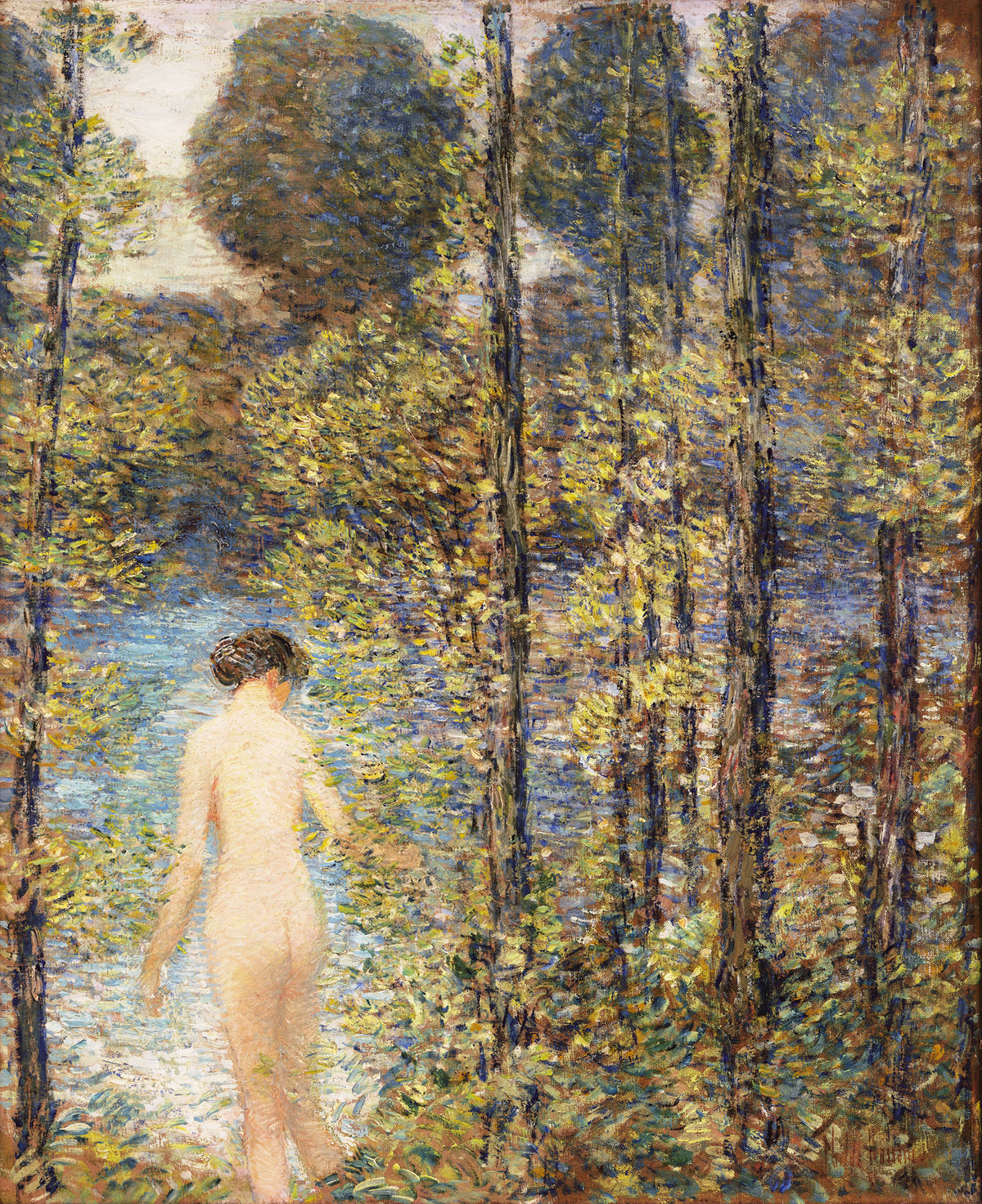
The Bather, 1905. Oil on canvas. Private collection.

After a brief period of depression and drinking as part of an apparent mid-life crisis, the forty-five-year-old Hassam then committed himself to a healthier life style, including swimming. During this time he felt a spiritual and artistic rejuvenation and he painted some Neo-Classical subjects, including nudes in outdoor settings. His urban subjects began to diminish and he confessed that he was tiring of city life, as bustling subways, elevated trains, and motor buses supplanted the graciousness of the horse-drawn scenes which he so enjoyed capturing in earlier times. The architecture of the city changed as well. Stately mansions gave way to skyscrapers, which he admitted had their own artistic appeal: "One must grant of course that if taken individually a skyscraper is not much of a marvel of art as a wildly formed architectural freak. It is when taken in groups with their zig zag outlines towering against the sky and melting tenderly into the distance that the skyscrapers are truly beautiful." Hassam's urban paintings took on a higher perspective and humans shrank in size accordingly, as illustrated in Lower Manhattan (1907). He began to spend only his winters in New York and traveled the balance of the year, calling himself "the Marco Polo of the painters." In 1904 and 1908, he traveled to Oregon and was stimulated by new subjects and diverse views, frequently working out-of-doors with friend, lawyer and amateur painter Colonel C. E. S. Wood. He produced over 100 paintings, pastels, and watercolors of the High Desert, the rugged coast, the Cascades, scenes of Portland, and even nudes in idealized landscapes (a series of bathers comparable to those of Symbolist Pierre Puvis de Chavannes). As usual, he adapted his style and colors to the subject at hand and the mood of place, but always in the Impressionist vein.

=== Late career ===
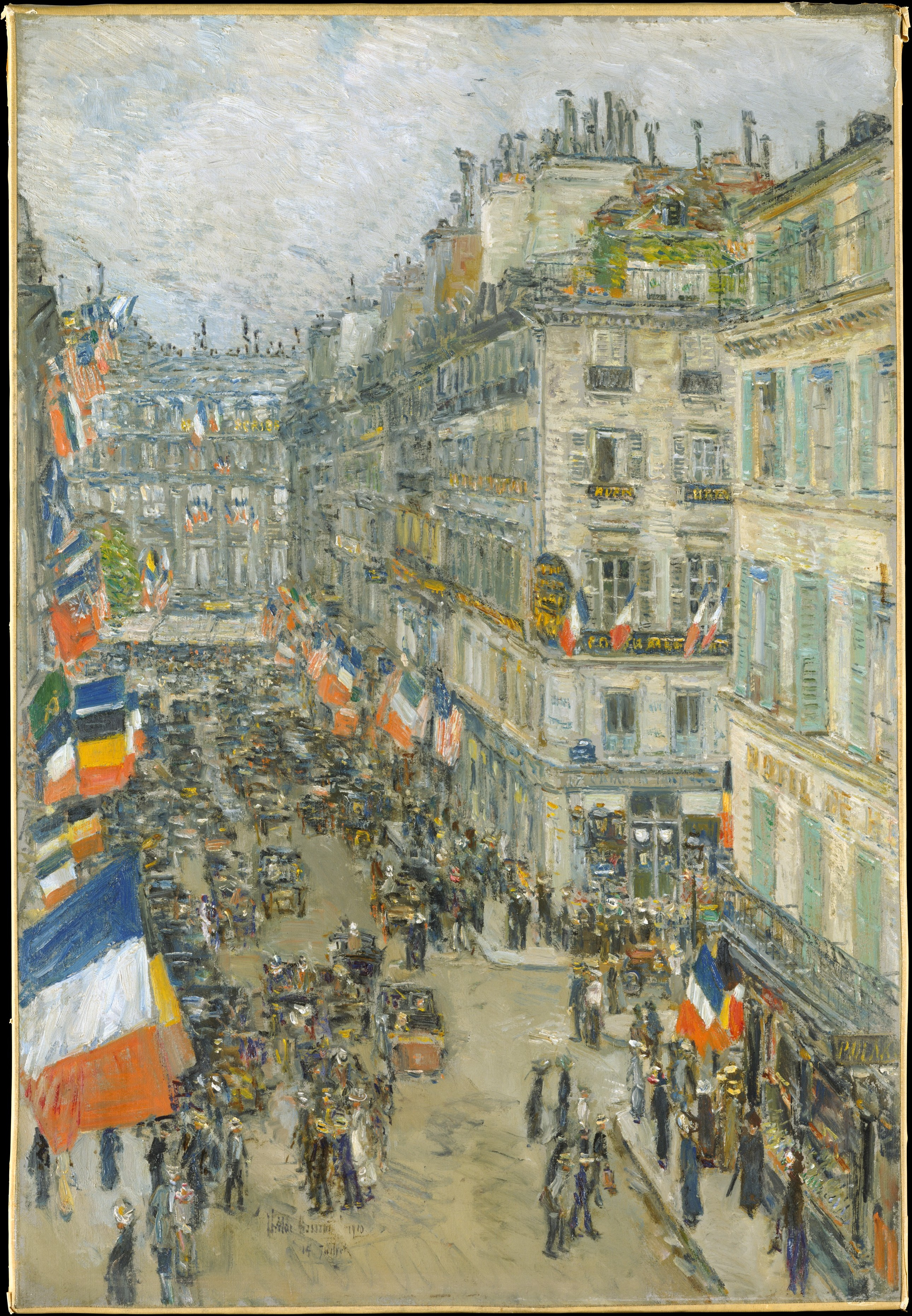
July Fourteenth, Rue Daunou, 1910

With the art market now eagerly accepting his work, by 1909 Hassam was enjoying great success, earning as much as $6,000 per painting. His close friend and fellow artist J. Alden Weir commented to another artist, "Our mutual friend Hassam has been in the greatest of luck and merited success. He sold his apartment studio and has sold more pictures this winter, I think, than ever before and is really on the crest of the wave. So he goes around with a crisp, cheerful air."

The Hassams returned to Europe in 1910 to find Paris much changed: "The town is all torn up like New York. Much building going on. They out American the Americans!" In the midst of the vibrant city, Hassam painted July Fourteenth, Rue Daunou during the Bastille Day celebrations, a forerunner of his famous Flag series (see below).

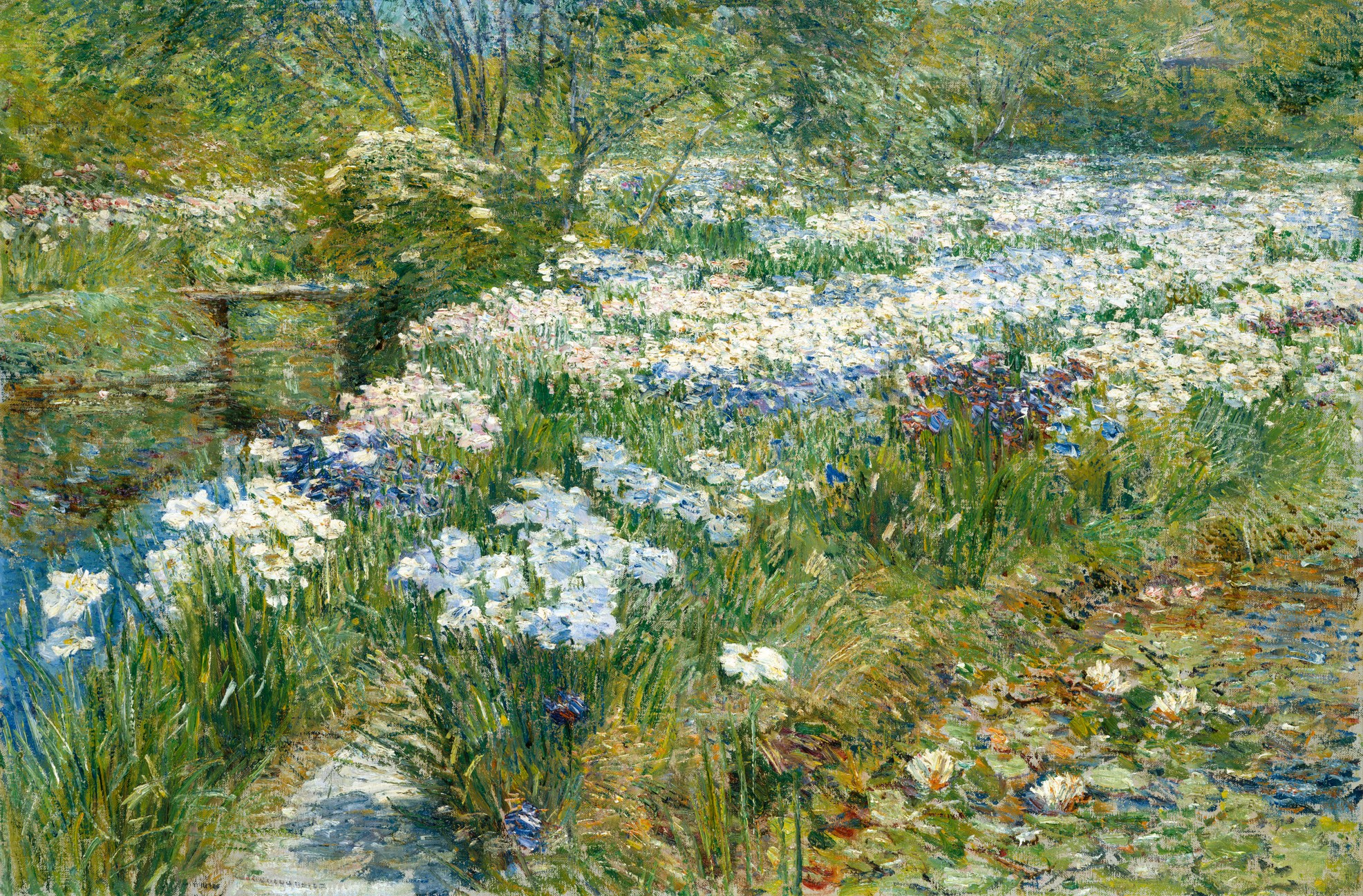
The Water Garden, c. 1909

When he returned to New York, Hassam began a series of "window" paintings that he continued until the 1920s, usually featuring a contemplative female model in a flowered kimono before a light-filled curtained or open window, as in The Goldfish Window (1916). The scenes were popular with museums and quickly snapped up. Hassam was especially prolific and energetic in the period from 1910 to 1920, causing one critic to comment, "Think of the appalling number of Hassam pictures there will be in the world by the time the man is seventy years old!" Hassam truly did produce thousands of works in nearly every medium during his life. Where his friend Weir might paint six canvases in a season, Hassam would do forty.

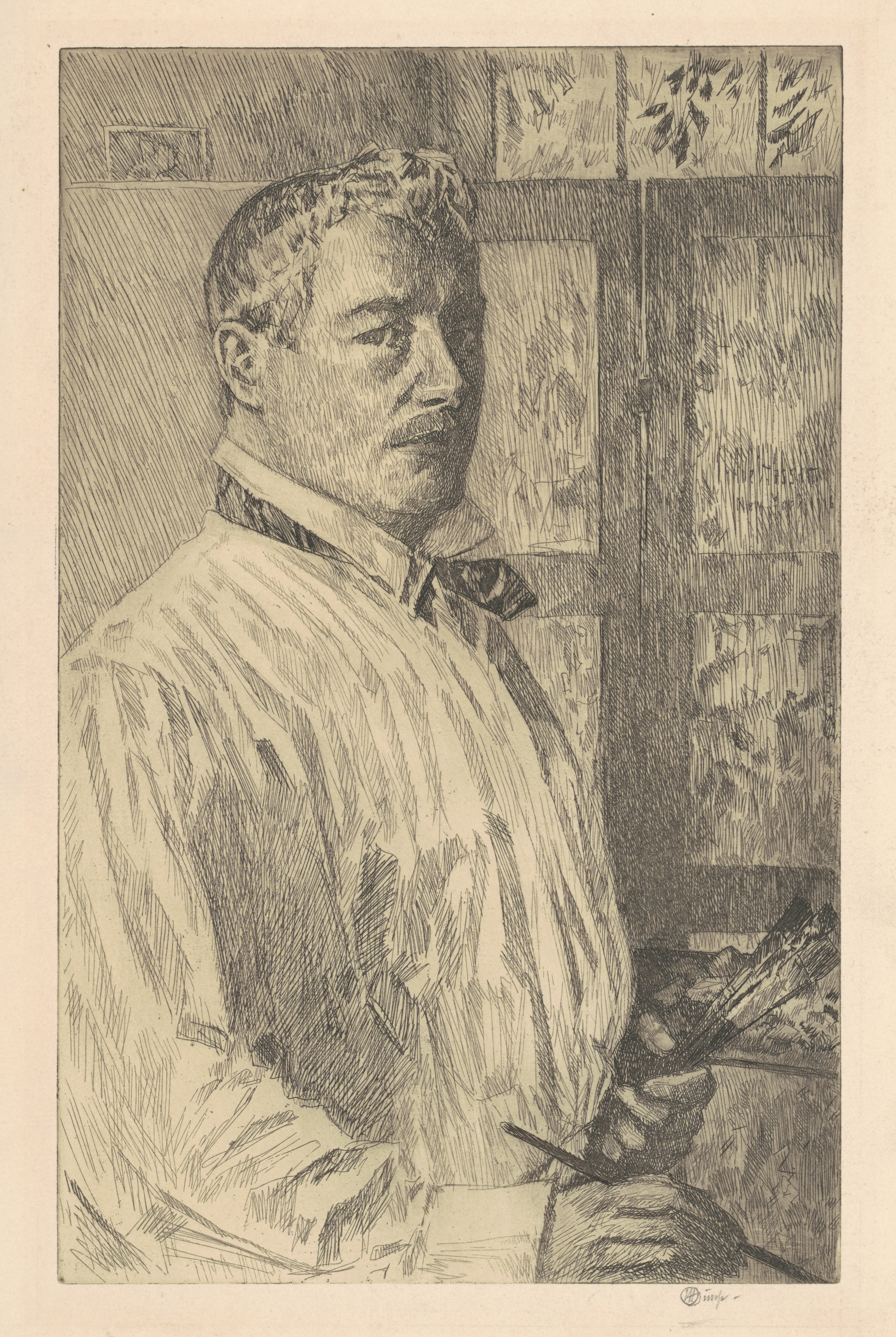
Self-Portrait, 1916, National Gallery of Art

During that period he also returned to watercolors and oils of coastal scenes, as exemplified by The South Ledges, Appledore (1913), which employs an unusually balanced division of sea and rocks diagonally across a nearly square canvas, giving equal weight to sea and land, water and rock. This painting shows the famous writer Celia Thaxter's home in Appledore Island. The South Ledges, Appledore is owned by the Smithsonian American Art Museum in Washington D.C. He also produced some still-life paintings.

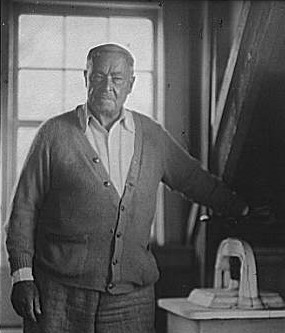
Portrait photograph of Childe Hassam, between 1911 and 1936

Hassam displayed six paintings at the landmark Armory Show of 1913, where Impressionism was finally viewed as a mainstream and nearly historical style, and displaced by the clamor over the radical revolution of Cubism, fresh from Europe. He and Weir were the oldest exhibitors, nicknamed at a press dinner as "the mammoth and the mastodon of American Art". Hassam viewed the new art trends from abroad with alarm, stating "this is the age of quacks, and quackery, and New York City is their objective point." He was also displeased that the Armory Show drew attention away from the latest exhibits of The Ten.

In 1913, Hassam received a commission to paint a mural at the Panama-Pacific Exhibition, which was held in 1915, where he was also honored with a separate gallery featuring thirty-eight paintings, although he did not attend the show. Around that same time, he renewed his interest in etching and lithography, producing more than 400 of these works during his later career. While Hassam found these works artistically satisfying, they received a tepid public response, as he commented, "some sell and some of the best do not."

== The Flag series ==
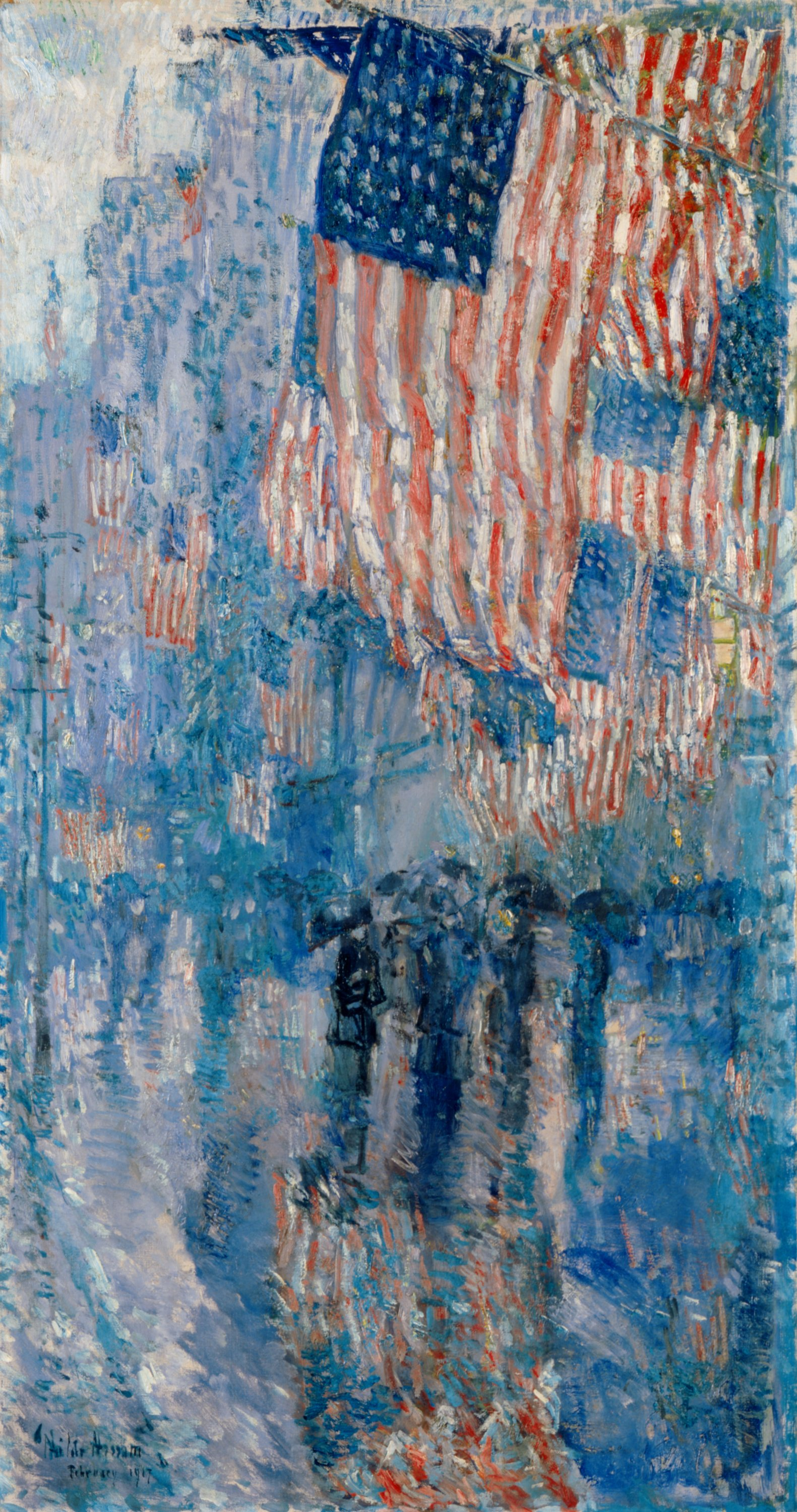
The Avenue in the Rain, oil on canvas, 1917. The White House

The most distinctive and famous works of Hassam's later life comprise the set of some thirty paintings known as the "Flag series". He began these in 1916 when he was inspired by a "Preparedness Parade" (for the US involvement in World War I), which was held on Fifth Avenue in New York (renamed the "Avenue of the Allies" during the Liberty Loan Drives of 1918). Thousands participated in these parades, which often lasted for over twelve hours.

Being an avid Francophile, of English ancestry, and strongly anti-German, Hassam enthusiastically backed the Allied cause and the protection of French culture. The Hassams joined with other artists in the war relief effort from nearly the beginning of the conflict in 1914, when most Americans, as well as President Woodrow Wilson, were decidedly isolationist. Hassam considered volunteering to record the war in Europe, but the government would not approve the trip. He was even arrested (and quickly released) for innocently sketching naval maneuvers along the city's rivers. In addition to the time he gave to many committees, several of his flag pictures were contributed to the war relief in exchange for Liberty Bonds. Although he had great hopes that the entire series would sell as a war memorial set (for $100,000), the pictures were sold individually instead after several group exhibitions, the last at the Corcoran Gallery in 1922.

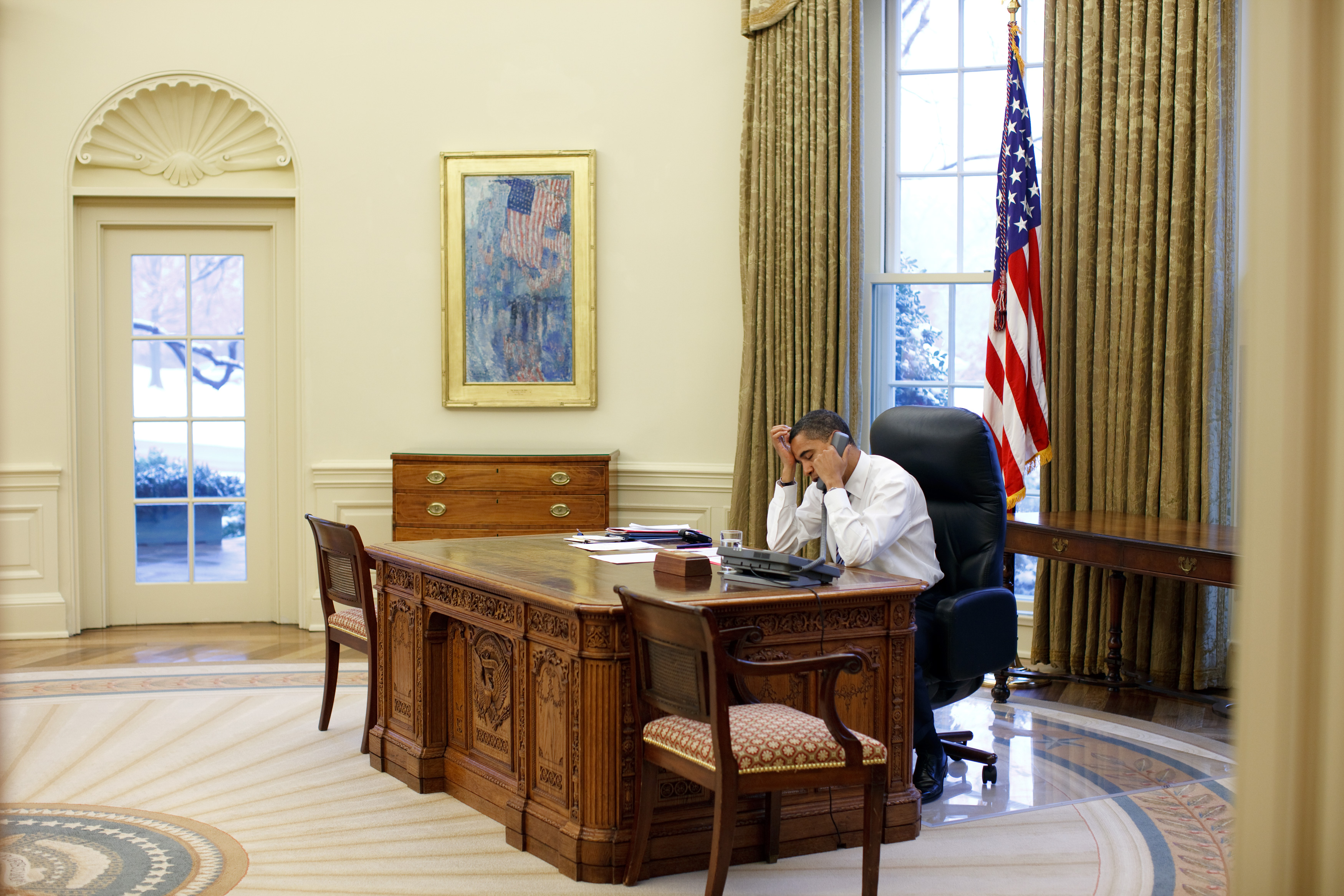
Hassam's The Avenue in the Rain hanging on the wall of the Oval Office, 2009

Claude Monet, among other French artists, had also painted flag-themed works, but Hassam's have a distinctly American character, showing the flags displayed on New York's most fashionable street with his own compositional style and artistic vision. In most paintings in the series, the flags dominate the foreground, while in others the flags are simply part of the festive panorama. In some, the American flags wave alone and in others, flags of the Allies flutter as well. In his most impressionistic painting in the series, The Avenue in the Rain (1917), which has been in the White House permanent collection since the Kennedy administration, the flags and their reflections are blurred so extremely as to appear to be viewed through a rain-smeared window. On entering the White House, Barack Obama chose to display it in the Oval Office. Hassam's flag paintings cover all seasons and various weather and light conditions. Hassam makes a patriotic statement without overt reference to parades, soldiers, or war, apart from one picture showing a flag exclaiming "Buy Liberty Bonds". Flag paintings by Hassam are in the collections of The Metropolitan Museum of Art, the New York Historical Society, the Virginia Museum of Fine Arts, the Princeton University Art Museum and the National Gallery of Art.

== Final years ==
In 1919, Hassam purchased a home in East Hampton, New York. Many of his late paintings employed nearby subjects in that town and elsewhere on Long Island. The post-war art market boomed in the 1920s, and Hassam commanded escalating prices, though some critics thought he had become static and repetitive, as American art had begun to move on to the Realism of the Ashcan School and artists like Edward Hopper and Robert Henri. In 1920, he received the Gold Medal of Honor for lifetime achievement from the Pennsylvania Academy of the Fine Arts and numerous other awards through the 1920s. In 1925 he was featured on 32nd Annual Exhibition of American Art at the Cincinnati Art Museum, together with Louise Woodroofe, Robert Henri and Mary Cassatt. His work was also part of the painting event in the art competition at the 1928 Summer Olympics. Hassam traveled relatively little in his last years, but did visit California, Arizona, Louisiana, Texas, and Mexico. He died in East Hampton in 1935, at age 75.

He denounced modern trends in art to the end of his life, and he termed "art boobys" all the painters, critics, collectors, and dealers who got on the bandwagon and promoted Cubism, Surrealism and other avant-garde movements. Until a revival of interest in American Impressionism in the 1960s, Hassam was considered among the "abandoned geniuses". As French Impressionist paintings reached extremely high prices in the 1970s, Hassam and other American Impressionists gained renewed interest and were bid up as well.

== Gallery ==
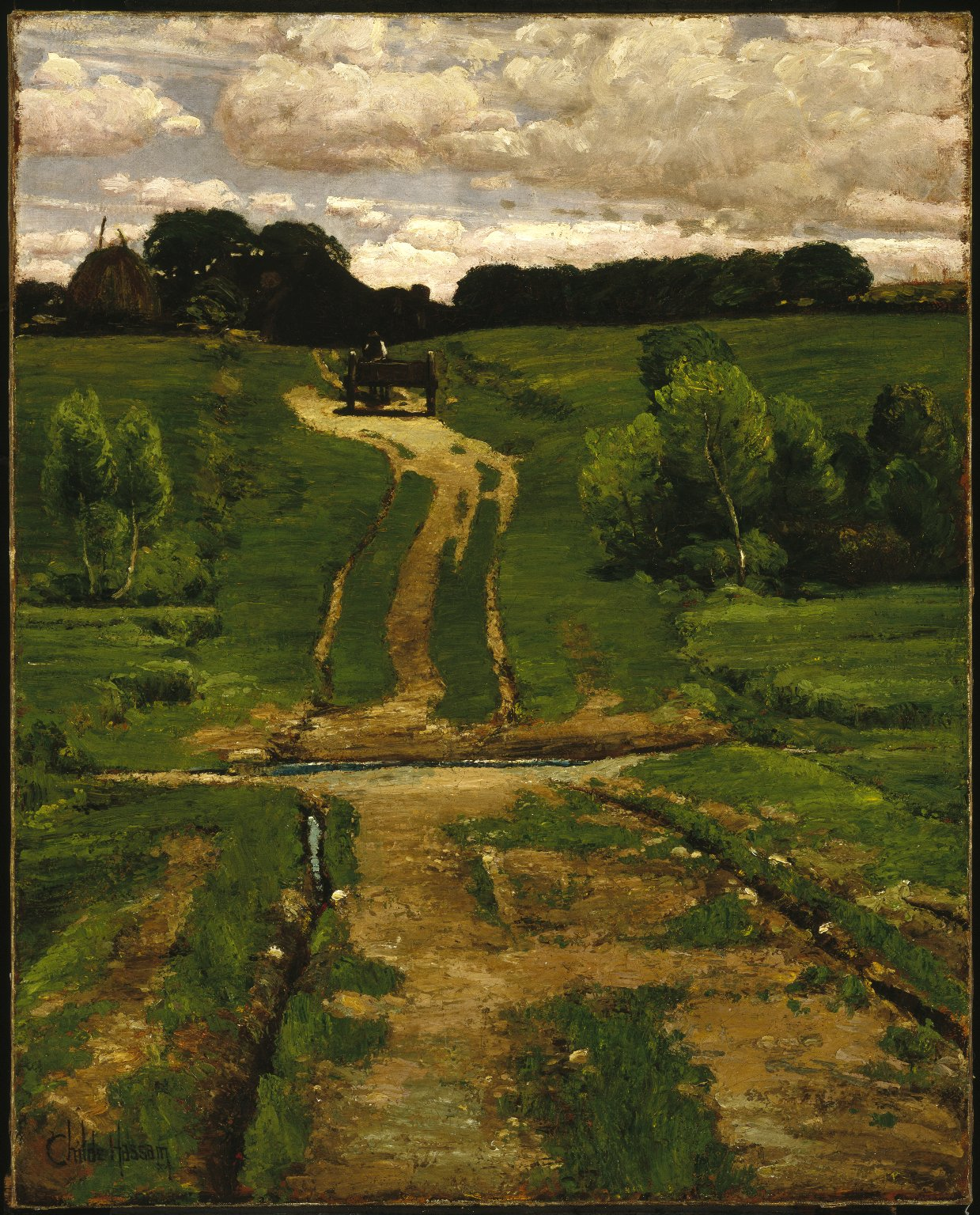
A Back Road, Brooklyn Museum

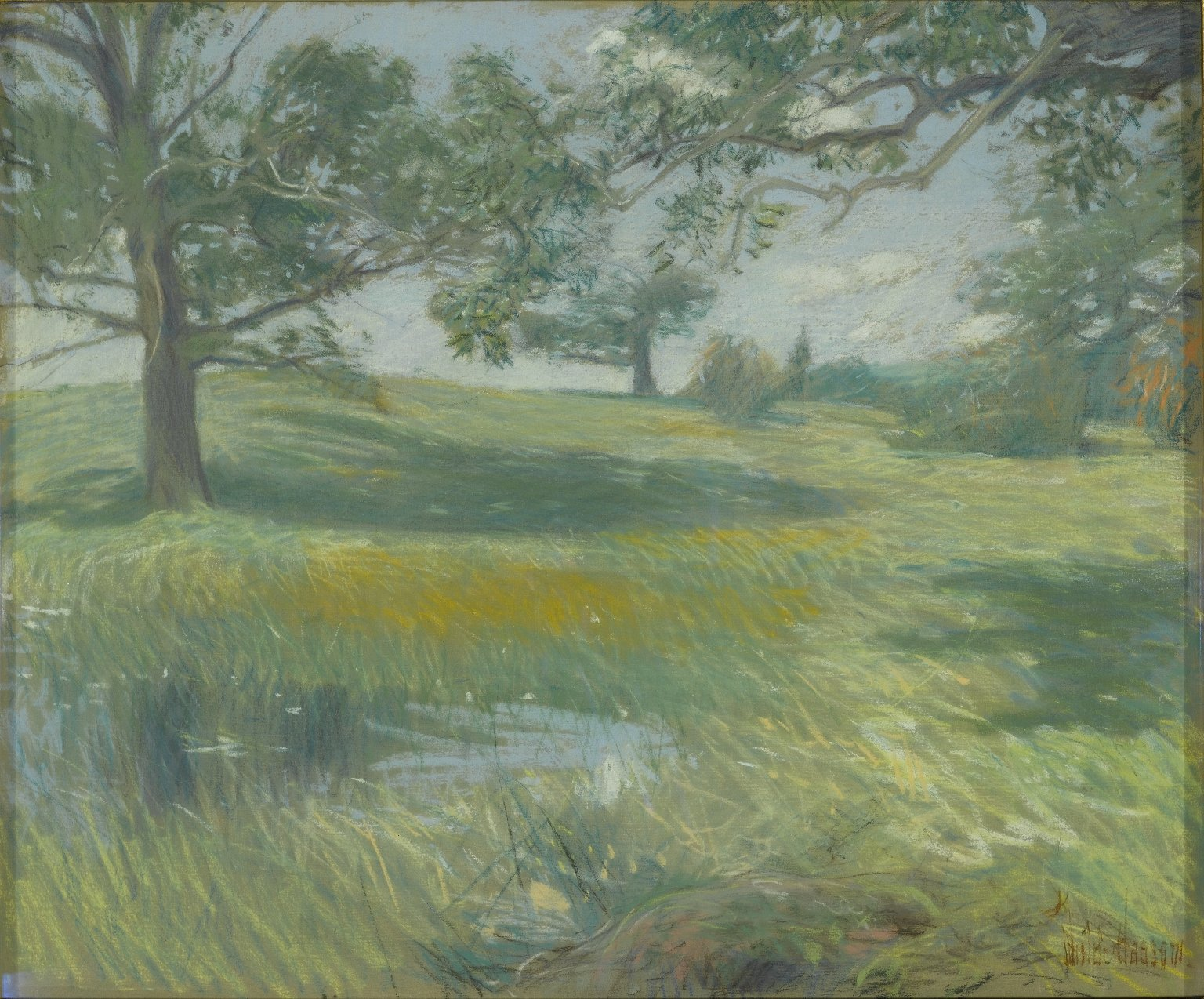
Meadows, Brooklyn Museum

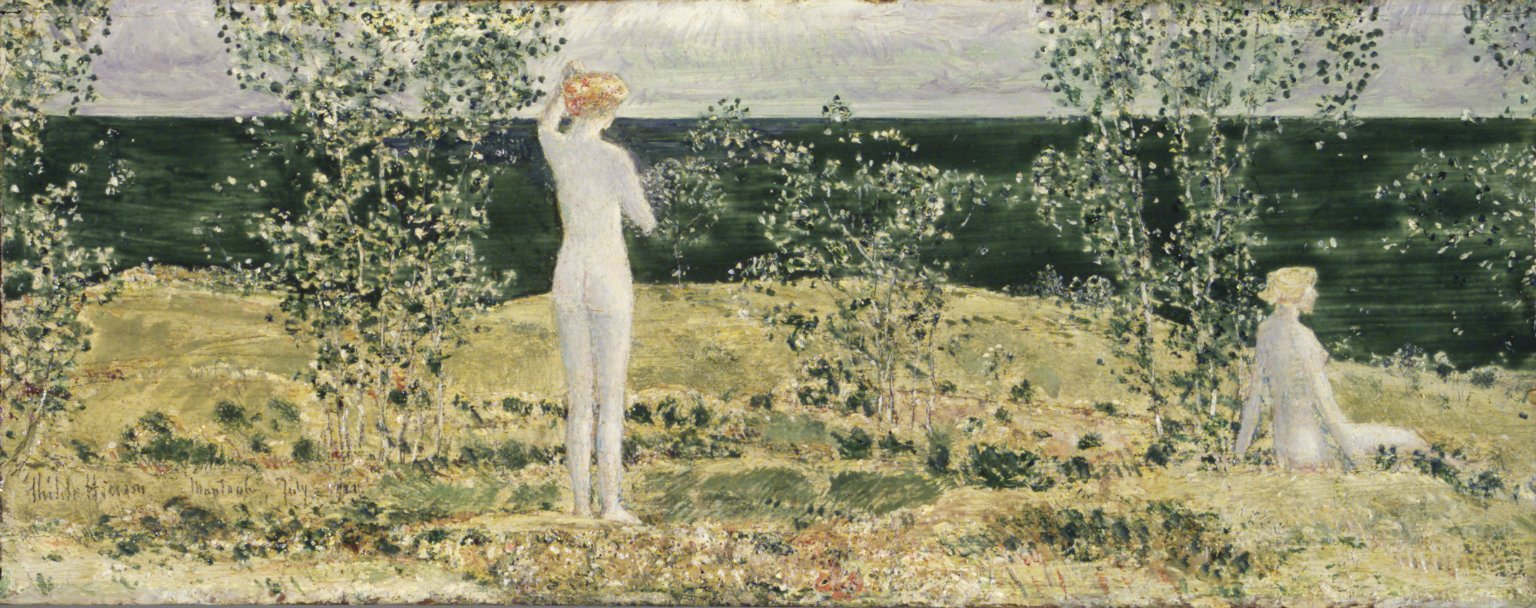
Montauk, Brooklyn Museum

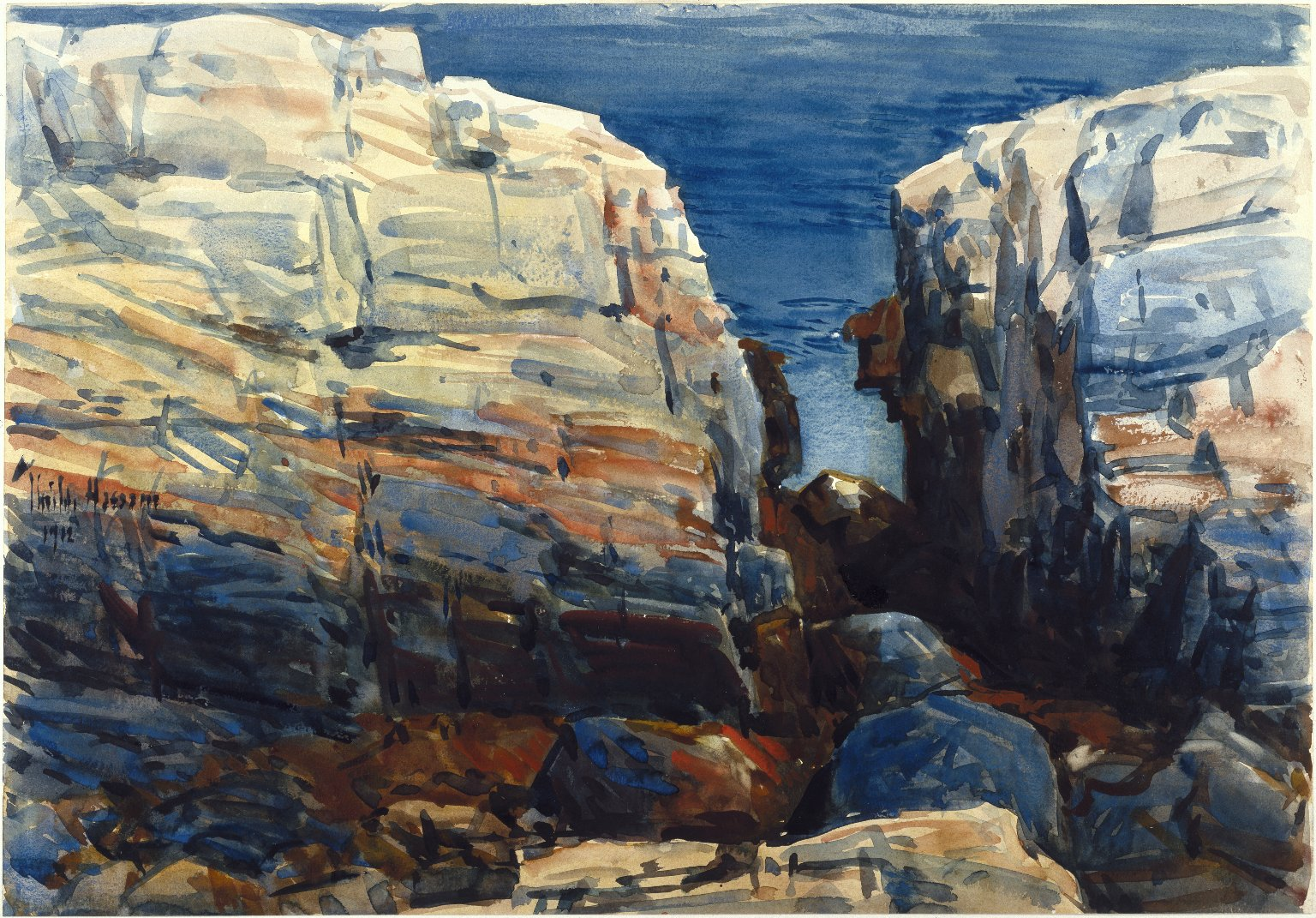
The Gorge, Appledore, Brooklyn Museum

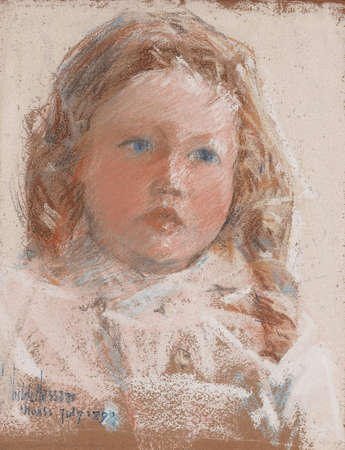
Sterling Turner

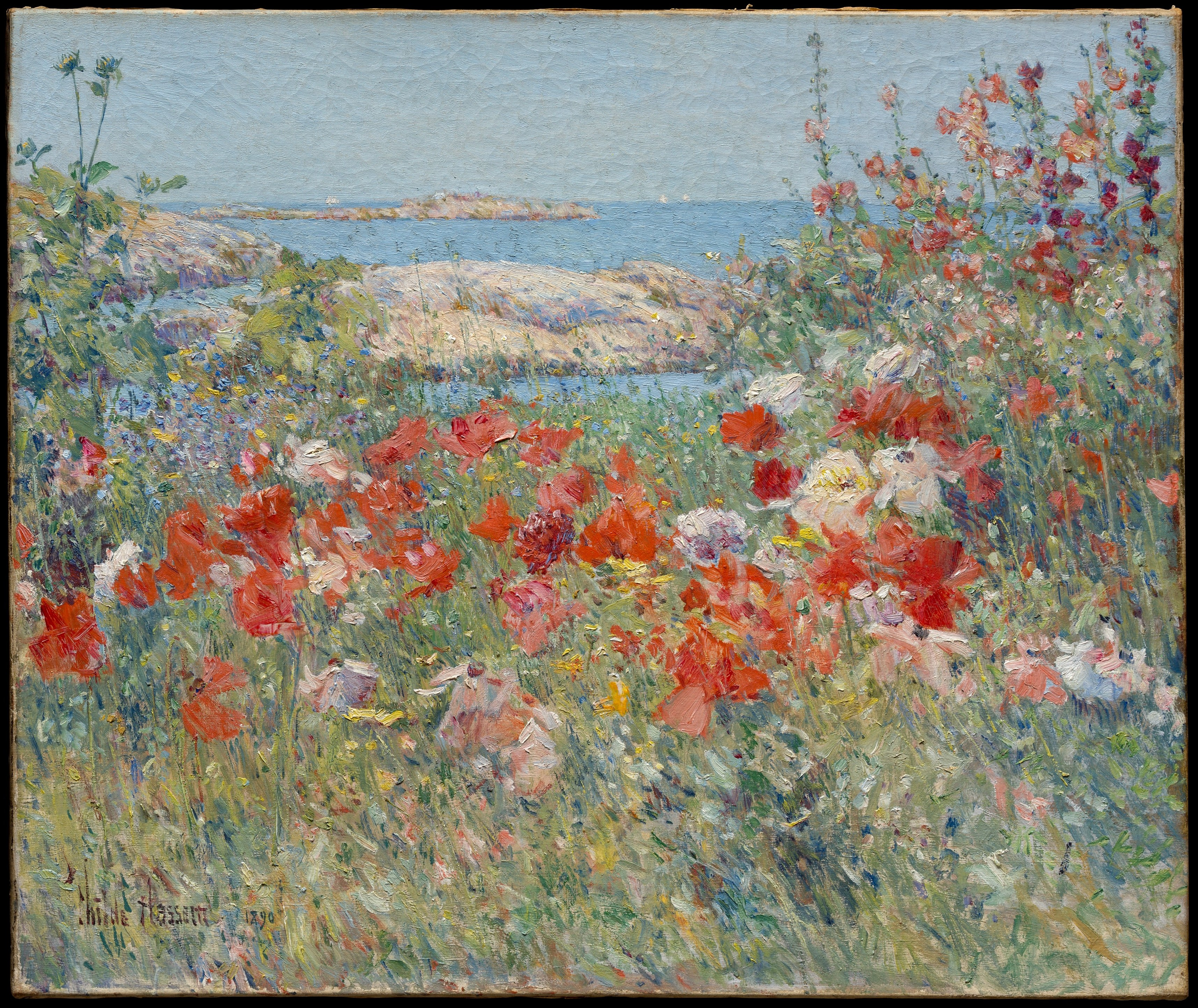
Celia Thaxter's Garden, 1890, The Metropolitan Museum of Art

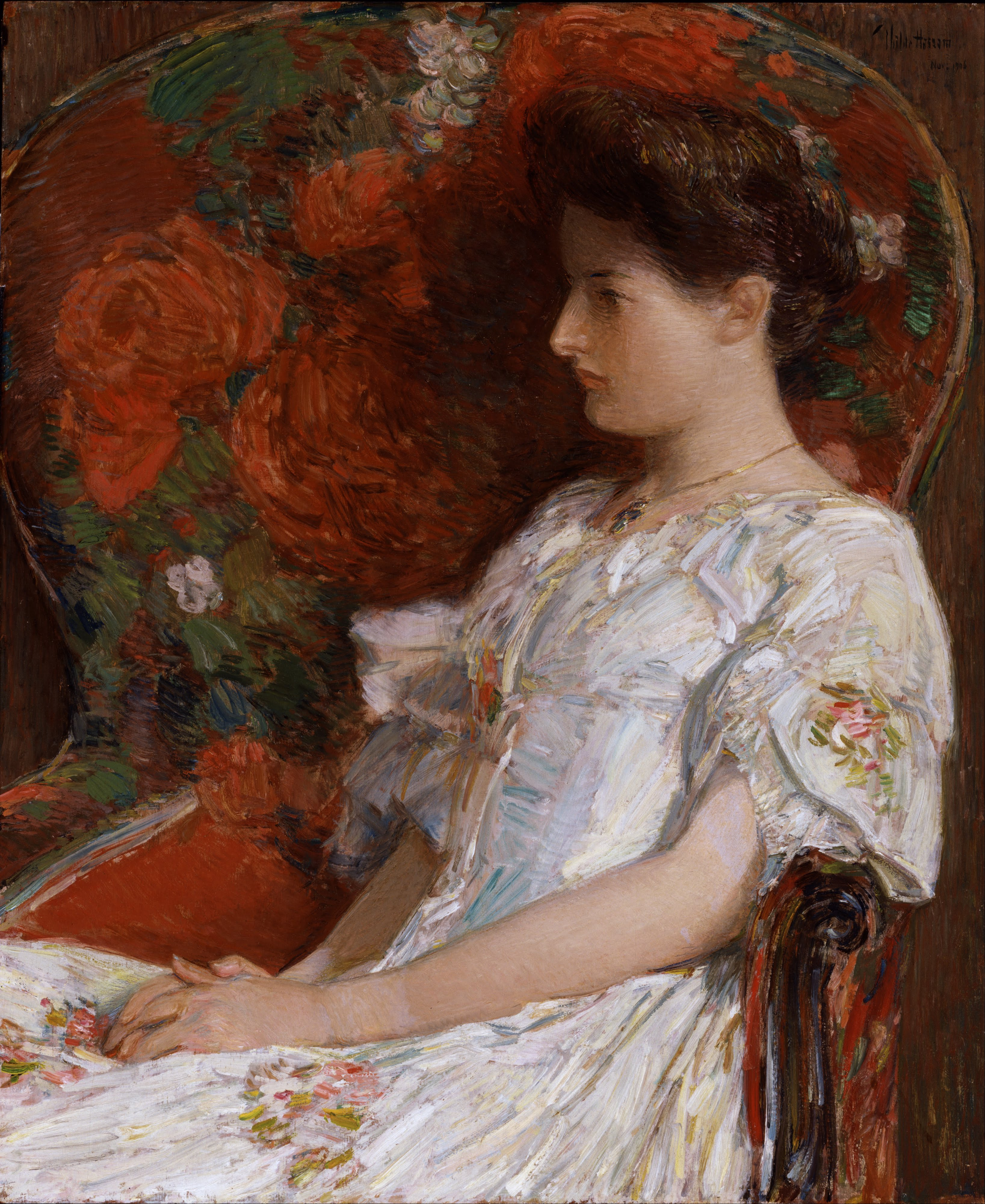
The Victorian Chair

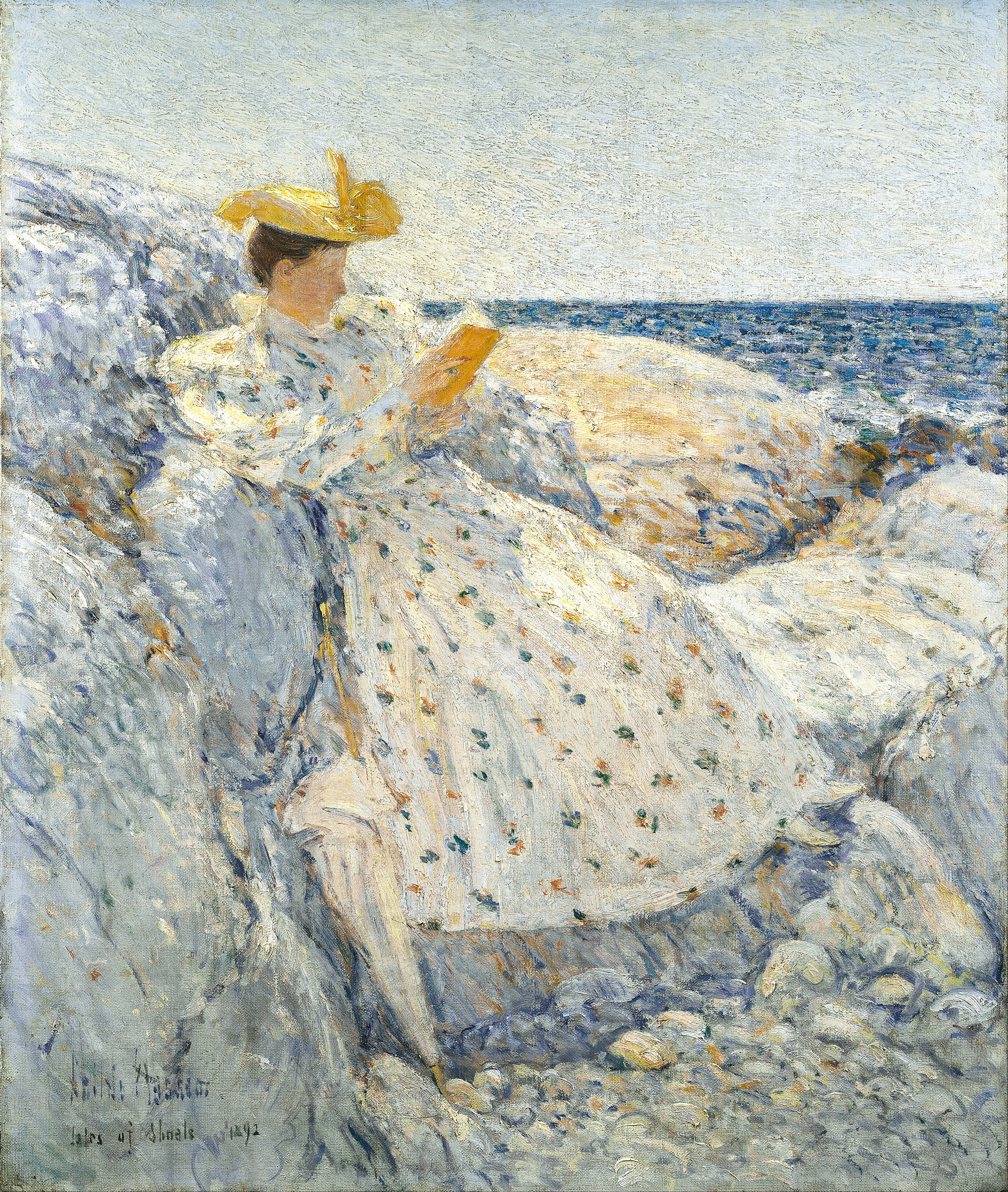
Summer Sunlight

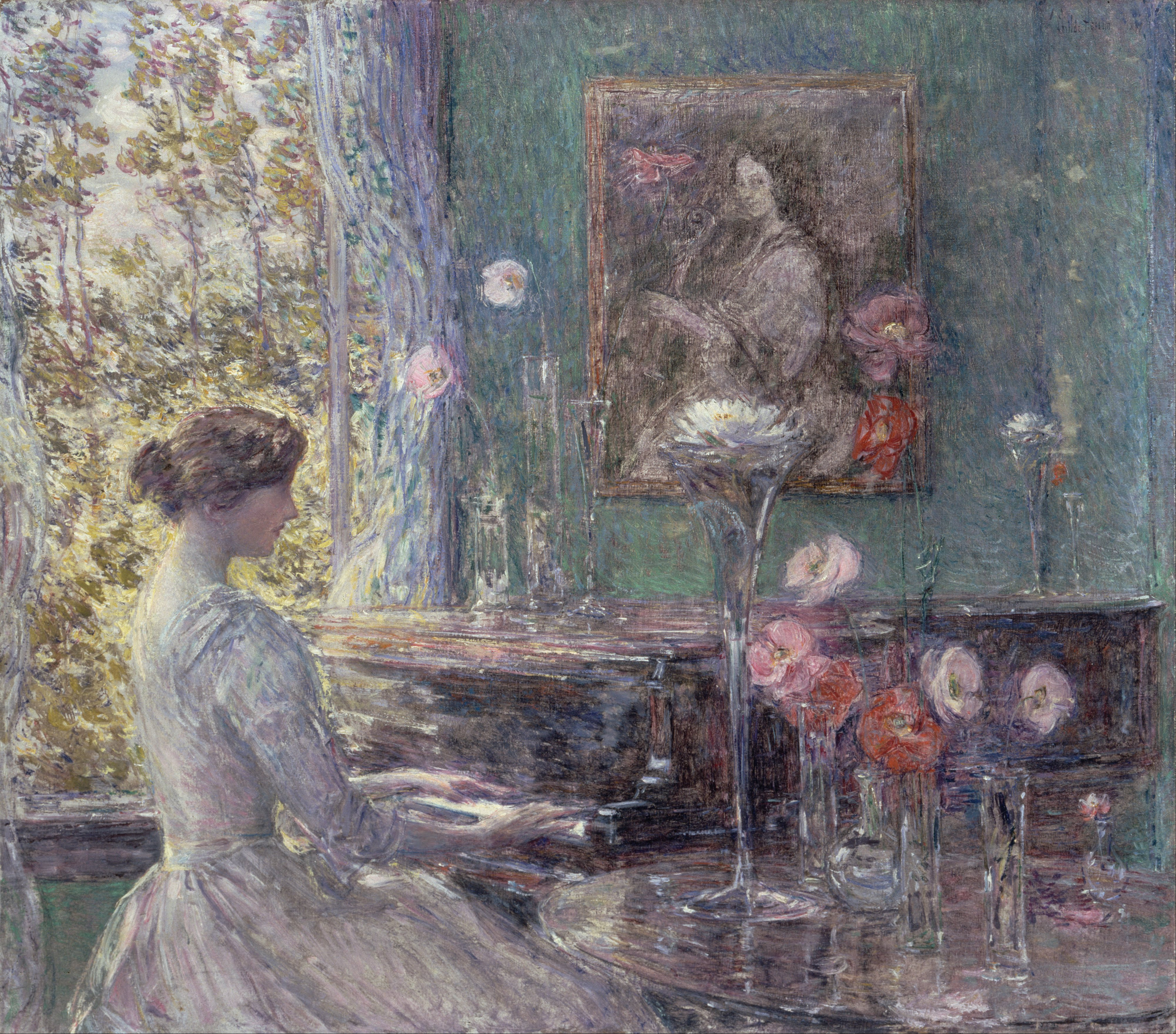
Improvisation

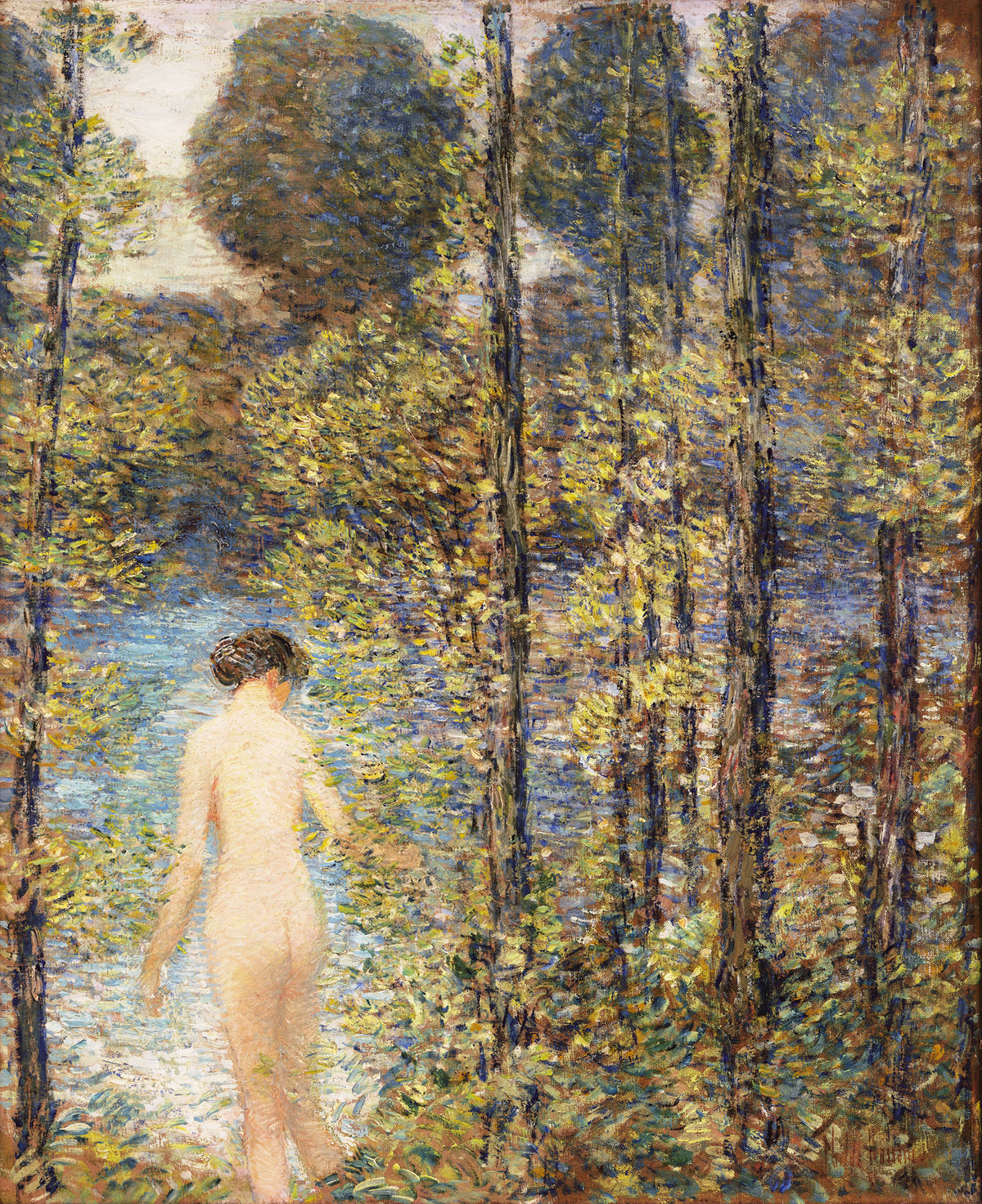
The Bather, 1905. Private collection.

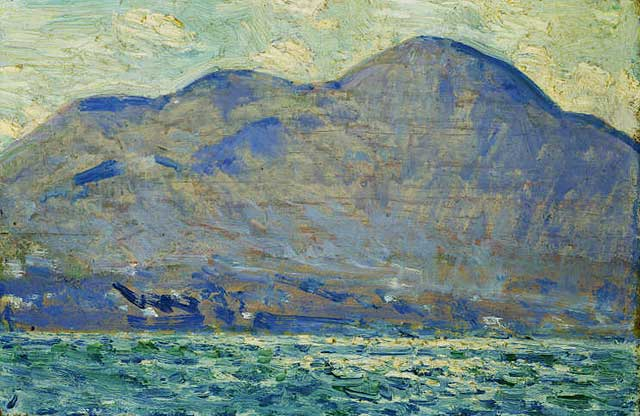
Mt. Beacon at Newburgh, 1916

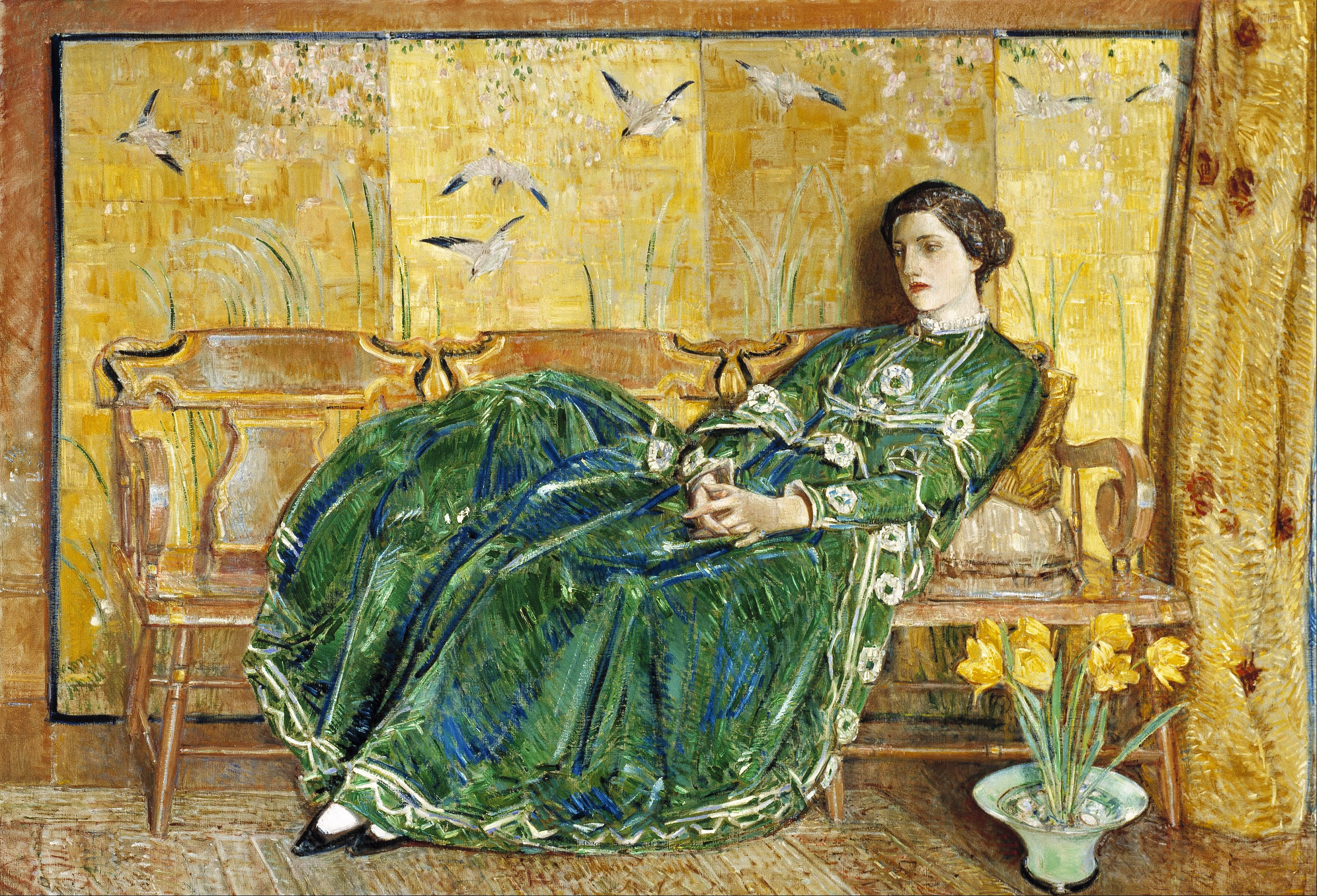
April - (The Green Gown)

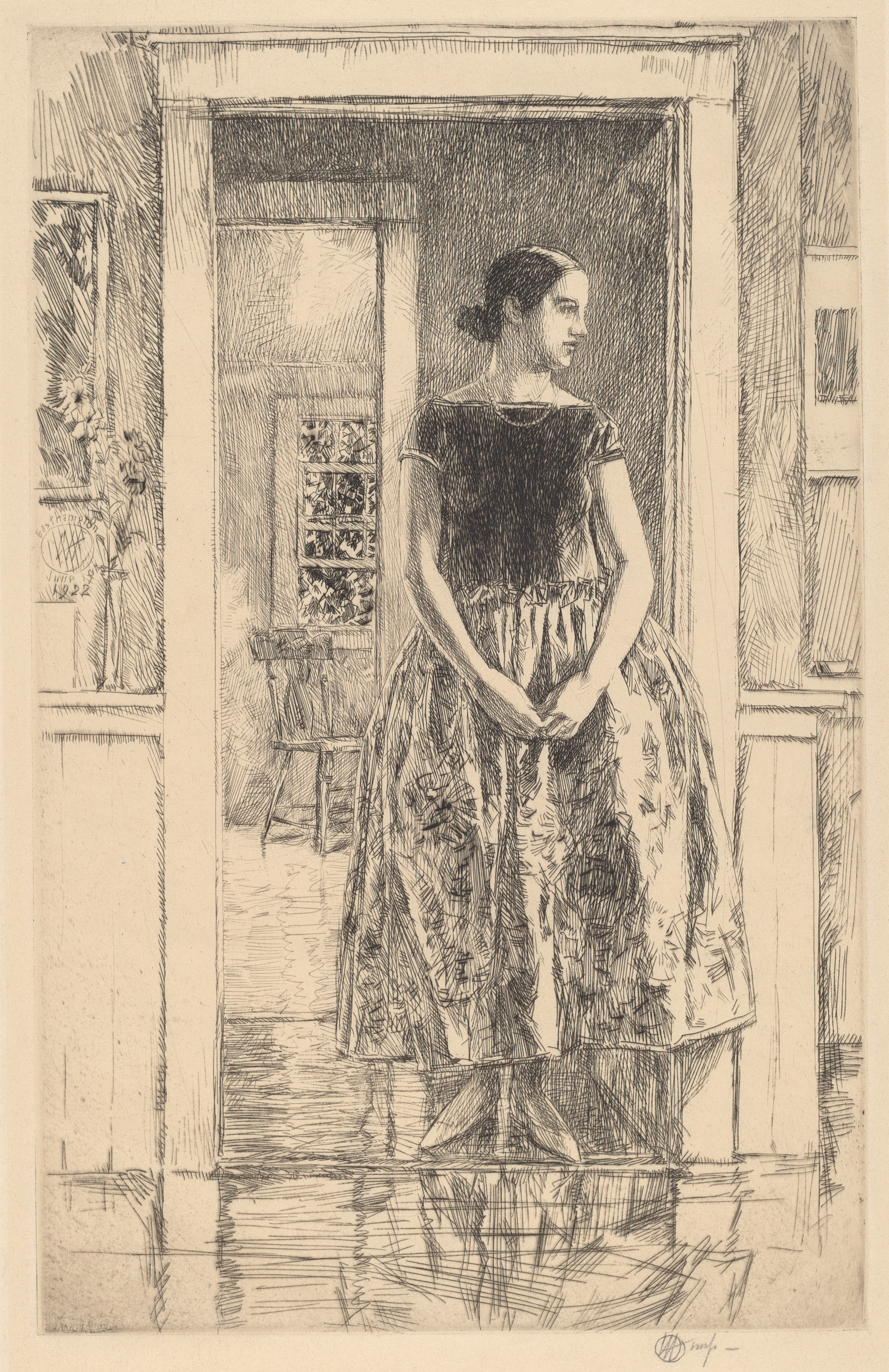
Girl in a Modern Gown, 1922, National Gallery of Art
