= Native American tribes in Virginia =

Indigenous tribes in Virginia, United States

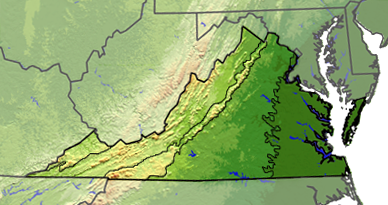
Topographical map of Virginia

The Native American tribes in Virginia are the Indigenous peoples whose tribal nations historically or currently are based in the Commonwealth of Virginia in the United States.

Native peoples lived throughout Virginia for at least 12,000 years. At contact, most tribes in what is now Virginia spoke languages from three major language families: Algonquian along the coast and Tidewater region, Siouan in the Piedmont region above the Fall Line, and Iroquoian in the interior, particularly the mountains. About 30 Algonquian tribes were allied in the powerful Powhatan Confederacy along the coast.

During English colonization and the formation of the United States, most Virginia tribes had lost their lands and their populations declined due to introduced diseases and warfare. Assimilationist policies also contributed to Indigenous erasure.

Surviving local tribes reorganized their governments in the late 20th century. Today Virginia has seven federally recognized tribes and eleven state-recognized tribes, four of which lack federal recognition.

== Federally recognized tribes in Virginia ==
Virginia has seven federally recognized tribes. These are tribes who can negotiate a government-to-government relationship with the United States.

The Pamunkey Indian Tribe was the first tribe in Virginia to gain federal recognition, which they achieved through the Bureau of Indian Affairs in 2015. In 2017, Congress recognized six more tribes through the Thomasina E. Jordan Indian Tribes of Virginia Federal Recognition Act.

The federally recognized tribes in Virginia are:

1. Chickahominy Indian Tribe
2. Chickahominy Indian Tribe–Eastern Division
3. Monacan Indian Nation
4. Nansemond Indian Nation
5. Pamunkey Indian Tribe
6. Rappahannock Tribe, Inc.
7. Upper Mattaponi Tribe.

== State-recognized tribes in Virginia ==
The Commonwealth of Virginia recognizes 11 state-recognized tribes. State-recognition is not well defined and does not confer the same rights as federal recognition. The Commonwealth of Virginia has recognized the Mattaponi and Pamunkey since its inception. Virginia recognized the Rappahannock, Upper Mattaponi, Nansemond, and Monacan Indian Nation in the 1980s. Finally, in 2010, Virginia recognized the Cheroenhaka (Nottoway), Nottoway of Virginia, and Patawomeck.

The eleven state-recognized tribes in Virginia are:

1. Cheroenhaka (Nottoway) Indian Tribe
2. Chickahominy Indian Tribe, also federally recognized
3. Chickahominy Indian Tribe–Eastern Division, also federally recognized
4. Mattaponi Indian Nation
5. Monacan Indian Nation, also federally recognized
6. Nansemond Indian Nation, also federally recognized
7. Nottoway Indian Tribe of Virginia
8. Pamunkey Indian Tribe, also federally recognized
9. Patawomeck Indian Tribe of Virginia
10. Rappahannock Indian Tribe, also federally recognized
11. Upper Mattaponi Tribe, also federally recognized

== History ==
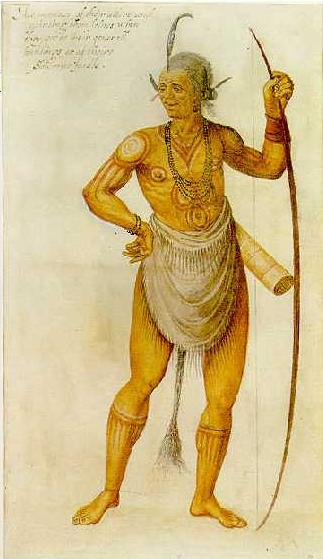
A 1585 watercolor of a Chesapeake Bay warrior by John White

=== 16th century ===
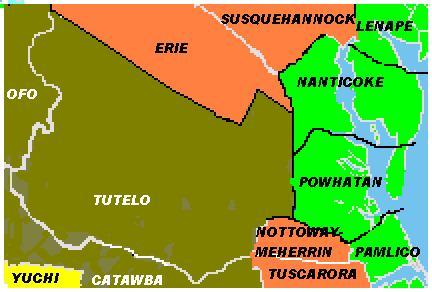
Estimated linguistic divisions c. AD 1565. Green is Algonquian, orange is Iroquoian, and olive is Siouan languages.

The first European explorers in what is now Virginia were Spaniards, who landed at two separate places several decades before the English founded Jamestown in 1607. By 1525 the Spanish had charted the eastern Atlantic coastline north of Florida. In 1609, Francisco Fernández de Écija, seeking to deny the English claim, asserted that Lucas Vázquez de Ayllón's failed colony of San Miguel de Gualdape, which lasted the three months of winter 1526–27, had been near Jamestown. Modern scholars instead place this first Spanish colony within US boundaries as having been on an island off Georgia.

In 1542, Spanish explorer Hernando de Soto in his expedition to the North American continent encountered the Chisca people, who lived in present-day southwestern Virginia. In the spring of 1567, the conquistador Juan Pardo was based at Fort San Juan, built near the Mississippian culture center of Joara in present-day western North Carolina. He sent a detachment under Hernando Moyano de Morales into present-day Virginia. This expedition destroyed the Chisca village of Maniatique. The site was later developed as the present-day town of Saltville, Virginia.

Meanwhile, as early as 1559–60, the Spanish had explored Virginia, which they called Ajacán, from the Chesapeake Bay while they sought a water passage to the west. They captured a Native man, possibly from the Paspahegh or Kiskiack tribe, whom they named Don Luis after they baptized him. They took him to Spain, where he received a Jesuit education. About ten years later, Don Luis returned with Spanish Jesuit missionaries to establish the short-lived Ajacán Mission. Native Americans attacked it in 1571 and killed all the missionaries.

English attempts to settle the Roanoke Colony in 1585–87 failed. Although the island site is located in present-day North Carolina, the English considered it part of the Virginia territory. The English collected ethnological information about the local Croatan tribe, as well as related coastal tribes extending as far north as the Chesapeake Bay.

There were no records of indigenous life before the Europeans started documenting their expeditions and colonization efforts. But scholars have used archaeological, linguistic and anthropological research to learn more about the cultures and lives of Native Americans in the region. Contemporary historians have also learned how to use the Native American oral traditions to explore their history.

According to colonial historian William Strachey, Chief Powhatan had slain the weroance at Kecoughtan in 1597, appointing his own young son Pochins as successor there. Powhatan resettled some of that tribe on the Piankatank River. (He annihilated the adult male inhabitants at Piankatank in fall 1608.)

In 1670 the German explorer John Lederer recorded a Monacan legend. According to their oral history, the Monacan, a Siouan-speaking people, settled in Virginia some 400 years earlier by following "an oracle," after being driven by enemies from the northwest. They found the Algonquian-speaking Tacci tribe (also known as Doeg) already living there. The Monacan told Lederer they had taught the Tacci to plant maize. They said that before that innovation, the Doeg had hunted, fished, and gathered their food.

Another Monacan tradition holds that, centuries prior to European contact, the Monacan and the Powhatan tribes had been contesting part of the mountains in the western areas of today's Virginia. The Powhatan had pursued a band of Monacan as far as the Natural Bridge, where the Monacan ambushed the Powhatan on the narrow formation, routing them. The Natural Bridge became a sacred site to the Monacan known as the Bridge of Mahomny or Mohomny (Creator). The Powhatan withdrew their settlements to below the Fall Line of the Piedmont, far to the east along the coast.

Another tradition relates that the Doeg had once lived in the territory of modern King George County, Virginia. About 50 years before the English arrived at Jamestown (i.e. c. 1557), the Doeg split into three sections, with one part moving to what became organized as colonial Caroline County, one part moving to Prince William, and a third part remaining in King George.

==== Houses ====
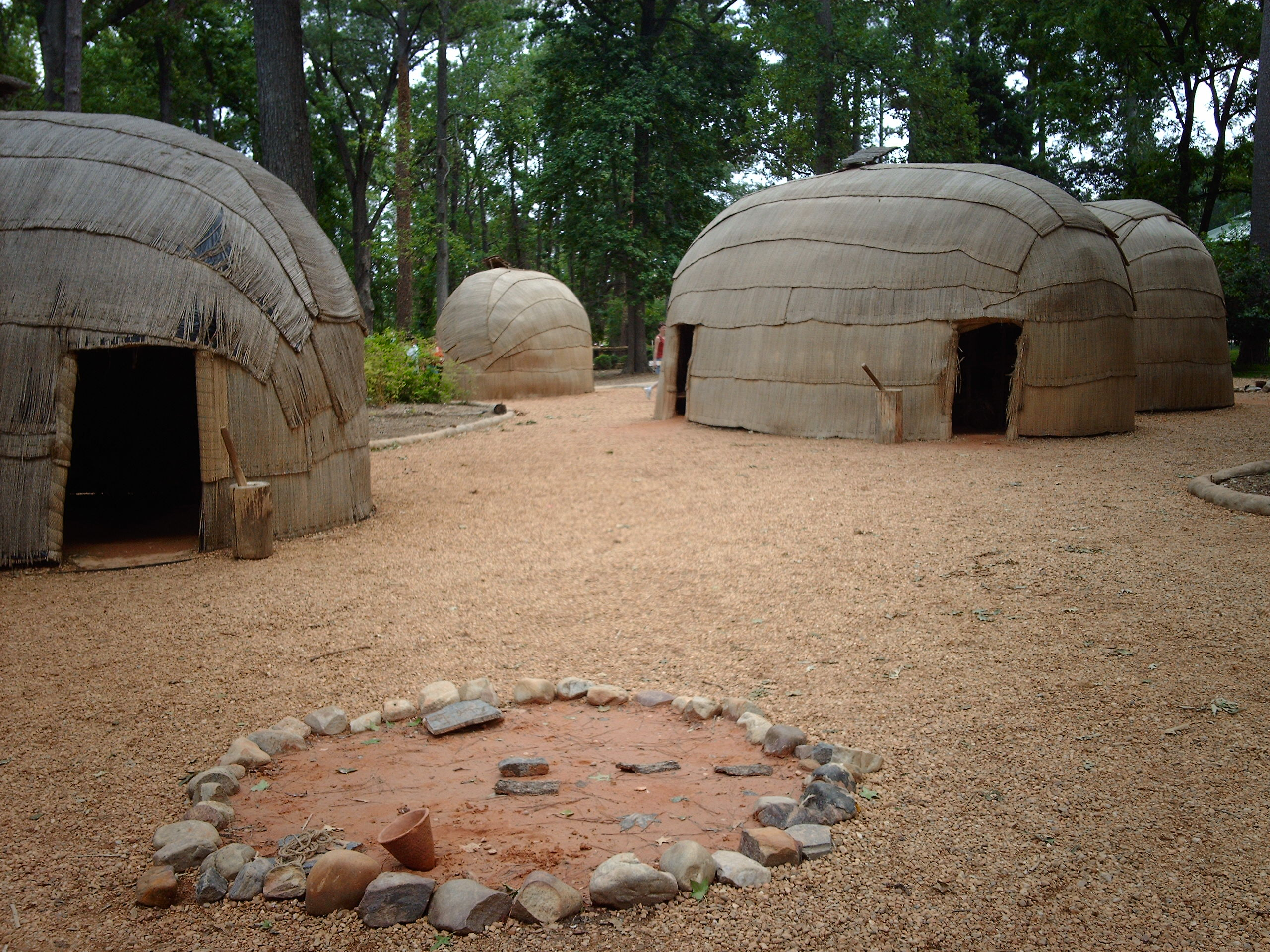
Reconstruction of a Powhatan village at Jamestown Settlement

Another expression of the different cultures of the three major language groups were their practices in constructing dwellings, both in style and materials. The Monacan, who spoke a Siouan language, created dome-shaped structures covered with bark and reed mats.

The tribes of the Powhatan Confederacy spoke Algonquian languages, as did many of the Atlantic coastal peoples all the way up into Canada. They lived in houses they called yihakans/yehakins, and which the English described as "longhouses". They were made from bent saplings lashed together at the top to make a barrel shape. The saplings were covered with woven mats or bark. The 17th-century historian William Strachey thought since bark was harder to acquire, families of higher status likely owned the bark-covered houses. In summer, when the heat and humidity increased, the people could roll up or remove the mat walls for better air circulation.

Inside a Powhatan house, bedsteads were built along both long walls. They were made of posts put in the ground, about a foot high or more, with small cross-poles attached. The framework was about 4 feet (1.2 m) wide, and was covered with reeds. One or more mats was placed on top for bedding, with more mats or skins for blankets. A rolled mat served as a pillow. During the day, the bedding was rolled up and stored so the space could be used for other purposes. There was little need for extra bedding because a fire was kept burning inside the houses to provide heat in the cold months. It would be used to repel insects during the warmer months.

Wildlife was abundant in this area. The buffalo were still plentiful in the Virginia Piedmont up until the 1700s. The Upper Potomac watershed (above Great Falls, Virginia) was once renowned for its unsurpassed abundance of wild geese, earning the Upper Potomac its former Algonquian name, Cohongoruton (Goose River). Men and boys hunted game, and harvested fish and shellfish. Women gathered greens, roots and nuts, and cooked these with the meats. Women were responsible for butchering the meat, gutting and preparing the fish, and cooking shellfish and vegetables for stew. In addition, women were largely responsible for the construction of new houses when the band moved for seasonal resources. Experienced women and older girls worked together to build the houses, with younger children assigned to assist.

=== 17th century ===
In 1607, when the English made their first permanent settlement at Jamestown, Virginia, the area of the current state was occupied by numerous tribes of Algonquian, Siouan, and Iroquoian linguistic stock. Captain John Smith made contact with numerous tribes, including the Wicocomico. More than 30 Algonquian tribes were associated with the politically powerful Powhatan Confederacy, whose homeland occupied much of the area east of the Fall Line along the coast. It spanned 100 by 100 miles (160 km), and covered most of the tidewater Virginia area and parts of the Eastern Shore, an area they called Tsenacommacah. Each of the more than 30 tribes of this confederacy had its own name and chief (weroance or werowance, female weroansqua). All paid tribute to a leader called the Mamanatowick who at the time was Powhatan, whose personal name was Wahunsenecawh. Succession and property inheritance in the tribe was governed by a matrilineal kinship system and passed through the mother's line.

Below the fall line lived related Algonquian tribes, the Chickahominy and the Doeg in Northern Virginia.

The Chickahominy did not immediately join the Powhatan Confederacy, and, instead of being led by a weroance, they were led by a council of elders. If Powhatan wished to use them as warriors, he had pay them in copper as mercenaries. The Accawmacke (including the Gingaskin) of the Eastern Shore, and the Patawomeck of Northern Virginia, were fringe members of the Confederacy. As they were separated by water from Powhatan's domains, the Accawmacke enjoyed some measure of semi-autonomy under their own leader, Debedeavon, aka "The Laughing King".

The Piedmont and area above the fall line were occupied by Siouan-speaking groups, such as the Monacan and Manahoac. The Iroquoian-speaking peoples of the Nottoway and Meherrin lived in what is now Southside Virginia south of the James River. Other tribes occupied mountain and foothill areas. The region beyond the Blue Ridge (including West Virginia) was considered part of the sacred hunting grounds. Like much of the Ohio Valley, it was depopulated during the later Beaver Wars (1670–1700) by attacks from the powerful Five Nations of the Haudenosaunee (Iroquois) from New York and Pennsylvania.

French Jesuit maps prior to that were labeled showing that previous inhabitants included the Siouan "Oniasont" (Nahyssan) and the Tutelo or "Totteroy," the former name of Big Sandy River — and another name for the Yesan or Nahyssan.

When the English first established the Virginia Colony, the Powhatan tribes had a combined population of about 15,000. Relations between the two peoples were not always friendly. After Captain John Smith was captured in the winter of 1607 and met with Chief Powhatan, relations were fairly good. The Powhatan sealed relationships such as trading agreements and alliances via the kinship between groups involved. The kinship was formed through a connection to a female member of the group. Powhatan sent food to the English, and was instrumental in helping the newcomers survive the early years.

By fall 1609, when Smith left Virginia due to a gunpowder accident, relations between the two peoples had soured. In the absence of Smith, Native affairs fell to the leadership of Captain George Percy. The English and Powhatan's men led attacks on one another in near succession under Percy's time as negotiator. With both sides raiding in attempts to sabotage supplies and steal resources, English and Powhatan relations quickly fell apart. Their competition for land and resources led to the First Anglo-Powhatan War.

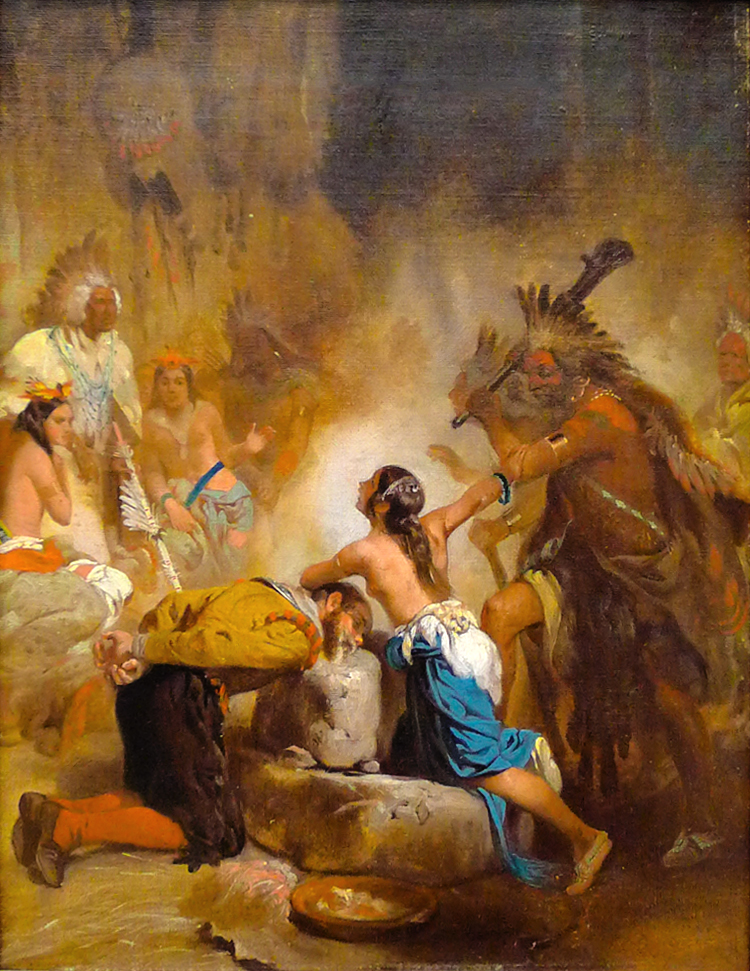
The story of Pocahontas, the daughter of Chief Powhatan and an ancestor of many of the First Families of Virginia through her marriage to John Rolfe, was romanticized by later artists.

In April 1613, Captain Samuel Argall learned that Powhatan's "favorite" daughter Pocahontas was residing in a Patawomeck village. Argall abducted her to force Powhatan to return English prisoners and stolen agricultural tools and weapons. Negotiations between the two peoples began. It was not until after Pocahontas converted to Christianity and married Englishman John Rolfe in 1614 that peace was reached between the two peoples. As noted, matrilineal kinship was stressed in Powhatan society. Pocahontas' marriage to John Rolfe linked the two peoples. The peace continued until after Pocahontas died in England in 1617 and her father in 1618.

After Powhatan's death, his leadership office, Mamanatowick, passed to his brother Opitchapan. His succession was brief and the Mamanatowick title quickly passed to Opechancanough. It was Opechancanough who planned a coordinated attack on the English settlements, beginning on March 22, 1622. He wanted to punish English encroachments on Indian lands and hoped to run the colonists off entirely. His warriors killed about 350-400 settlers (up to one-third of the estimated total population of about 1,200), during the attack. The colonists called it the Indian massacre of 1622. Jamestown was spared because Chanco, an Indian boy living with the English, warned the English about the impending attack. The English retaliated. Conflicts between the peoples continued for the next 10 years, until a tenuous peace was reached.

In 1644, Opechancanough planned a second attack to turn the English out. Their population had reached about 8,000. His warriors again killed about 350-400 settlers in the attack. It led to the Second Anglo-Powhatan War. In 1646, Opechancanough was captured by the English. Against orders, a guard shot him in the back and killed him. His death began the death of the Powhatan Confederacy. Opechancanough's successor, Necotowance signed his people's first treaty with the English in October 1646.

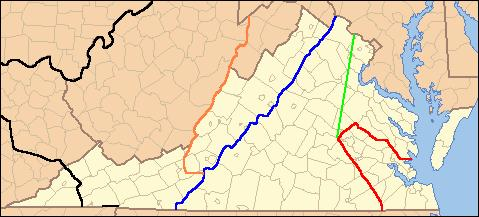
Lines show legal treaty frontiers between Virginia Colony and Indian Nations in various years. Red: Treaty of 1646. Green: Treaty of Albany (1684). Blue: Treaty of Albany (1722). Orange: Proclamation of 1763. Black: Treaty of Camp Charlotte (1774). Area west of this line in present-day Southwest VA was ceded by the Cherokee in 1775.

The 1646 treaty delineated a racial frontier between Indian and English settlements, with members of each group forbidden to cross to the other side except by special pass obtained at one of the newly erected border forts. By this treaty, the extent of the Virginia Colony open to patent by English colonists was defined as:

All the land between the Blackwater and York rivers, and up to the navigable point of each of the major rivers - which were connected by a straight line running directly from modern Franklin on the Blackwater, northwesterly to the Appomattoc village beside Fort Henry, and continuing in the same direction to the Monocan village above the falls of the James, where Fort Charles was built, then turning sharp right, to Fort Royal on the York (Pamunkey) river.

In 1658, English authorities became concerned that settlers would dispossess the tribes living near growing plantations and convened an assembly. The assembly stated English colonists could not settle on Indian land without permission from the governor, council, or commissioners and land sales had to be conducted in quarter courts, where they would be public record. Through this formal process, the Wicocomico transferred their lands in Northumberland County to Governor Samuel Mathews in 1659.

Necotowance thus ceded the English vast tracts of uncolonized land, much of it between the James and Blackwater Rivers. The treaty required the Powhatan to make yearly tribute payment to the English of fish and game, and it also set up reservation lands for the Indians. All Indians were at first required to display a badge made of striped cloth while in English territory, or they could be murdered on the spot. In March 1662 New Style, this law was changed to require them to display a silver or copper badge with the name of the native town or else be subject to arrest. Likewise, extreme penalties, including two hours in the pillory with written shame letters on court date and 5,000 pounds of tobacco for the public use, were imposed on any Englishman who took away such identification badge to make a lawful visitor appear to be guilty of breaking the law.

Around the year 1670, Seneca warriors from the New York Haudenosaunee Confederacy conquered the territory of the Manahoac of Northern Piedmont. That year the Virginia Colony had expelled the Doeg from Northern Virginia east of the fall line. With the Seneca action, the Virginia Colony became de facto neighbours of part of the Haudenosaunee Five Nations. Although the Haudenosaunee never settled the Piedmont area, they entered it for hunting and raiding against other tribes. The first treaties conducted at Albany between the two powers in 1674 and 1684 formally recognized the Haudenosaunee claim to Virginia above the Fall Line, which they had conquered from the Siouan peoples. At the same time, from 1671 to 1685, the Cherokee seized what are now the westernmost regions of Virginia from the Cheraw.

In 1677, following Bacon's Rebellion, the Treaty of Middle Plantation was signed, with more of the Virginia tribes participating. The treaty reinforced the yearly tribute payments, and a 1680 annexe added the Siouan and Iroquoian tribes of Virginia to the roster of Tributary Indians. It allowed for more reservation lands to be set up. The treaty was intended to assert that the Virginia Indian leaders were subjects of the King of England.

In 1693 the College of William and Mary officially opened. One of the initial goals of the college was to educate Virginia Indian boys. Funding from a farm named "Brafferton," in England, were sent to the school in 1691 for this purpose. The funds paid for living expenses, classroom space, and a teacher's pay. Only children of treaty tribes could attend, but at first none of them sent their children to the colonial school. By 1711, Governor Spotswood offered to remit the tribes' yearly tribute payments if they would send their boys to the school. The incentive worked and that year, the tribes sent twenty boys to the school. As the years passed, the number of Brafferton students decreased. By late in the 18th century, the Brafferton Fund was diverted elsewhere. From that time, the college was restricted to ethnic Europeans (or whites) until 1964, when the federal government passed civil rights legislation ending segregation in public facilities.

=== 18th century ===
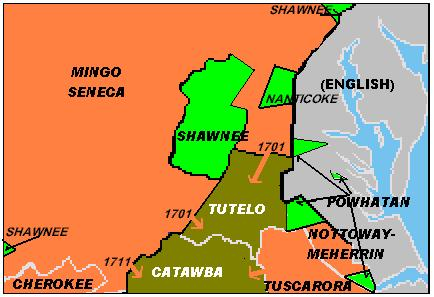
Approximate linguistic divisions c. AD 1700. The Powhatan, Tutelo and Nottoway-Meherrin were tributary to English; the Shawnee were tributary to the Seneca at this time.

Among the early Crown Governors of Virginia, Lt. Governor Alexander Spotswood had one of the most coherent policies toward Native Americans during his term (1710–1722), and one that was relatively respectful of them. He envisioned having forts built along the frontier, which Tributary Nations would occupy, to act as buffers and go-betweens for trade with the tribes farther afield. They would also receive Christian instruction and civilization. The Virginia Indian Company was to hold a government monopoly on the thriving fur trade. The first such project, Fort Christanna, was a success in that the Tutelo and Saponi tribes took up residence. But, private traders, resentful of losing their lucrative share, lobbied for change, leading to its break-up and privatization by 1718.

Spotswood worked to make peace with his Haudenosaunee neighbours, winning a concession from them in 1718, of all the land they had conquered as far as the Blue Ridge Mountains and south of the Potomac. This was confirmed at Albany in 1721. This clause was to be a bone of contention decades later, as it seemed to make the Blue Ridge the new demarcation between the Virginia Colony and Haudenosaunee land. But the treaty technically stated that this mountain range was the border between the Haudenosaunee and the Virginia Colony's Tributary Indians. English colonists considered this license to cross the mountains with impunity, which the Haudenosaunee resisted. This dispute, which first flared in 1736 as Europeans began to settle the Shenandoah Valley, came to a head in 1743. It was resolved the next year by the Treaty of Lancaster, settled in Pennsylvania.

Following this treaty, some dispute remained as to whether the Haudenosaunee had ceded only the Shenandoah Valley, or all their claims south of the Ohio. Moreover, much of this land beyond the Alleghenies was disputed by claims of the Shawnee and Cherokee nations. The Haudenosaunee recognized the English right to settle south of the Ohio at Logstown in 1752. The Shawnee and Cherokee claims remained, however.

In 1755 the Shawnee, then allied with the French in the French and Indian War, raided an English camp of settlers at Draper's Meadow, now Blacksburg, killing five and abducting five. The colonists called it the Draper's Meadow Massacre. The Shawnee captured Fort Seybert (now in West Virginia) in April 1758. Peace was reached that October with the Treaty of Easton, where the colonists agreed to establish no further settlements beyond the Alleghenies.

Hostilities resumed in 1763 with Pontiac's War, when Shawnee attacks forced colonists to abandon frontier settlements along the Jackson River, as well as the Greenbrier River now in West Virginia, the associated valleys on either side of the Allegheny ridge, and the latter just beyond the Treaty of Easton limit. Meanwhile, the Crown's Proclamation of 1763 confirmed all land beyond the Alleghenies as Indian Territory. It attempted to set up a reserve recognizing native control of this area and excluding European colonists. Shawnee attacks as far east as Shenandoah County continued for the duration of Pontiac's War, until 1766.

Many colonists considered the Proclamation Line adjusted in 1768 by the Treaty of Hard Labour, which demarcated a border with the Cherokee nation running across southwestern Virginia, and by the Treaty of Fort Stanwix, by which the Haudenosaunee Six Nations formally sold the British all their claim west of the Alleghenies, and south of the Ohio. However, this region (which included the modern states of Kentucky, and West Virginia, as well as southwestern Virginia) was still populated by the other tribes, including the Cherokee, Shawnee, Lenape, and Mingo, who were not party to the sale. The Cherokee border had to be readjusted in 1770 at the Treaty of Lochaber, because European settlement in Southwest Virginia had already moved past the 1768 Hard Labour line. The following year the Native Americans were forced to make further land concessions, extending into Kentucky. Meanwhile, the Virginian settlements south of the Ohio (in West Virginia) were bitterly challenged, particularly by the Shawnee.

The resulting conflict led to Dunmore's War (1774). A series of forts controlled by Daniel Boone began to be built in the valley of the Clinch River during this time. By the Treaty of Camp Charlotte concluding this conflict, the Shawnee and Mingo relinquished their claim south of the Ohio. The Cherokee sold Richard Henderson a portion of their land encompassing extreme southwest Virginia in 1775 as part of the Transylvania purchase. This sale was not recognized by the royal colonial government, nor by the Chickamauga Cherokee war chief Dragging Canoe. But, contributing to the revolution, settlers entered Kentucky by rafting down the Ohio River in defiance of the Crown. In 1776, the Shawnee joined Dragging Canoe's Cherokee faction in declaring war on the "Long Knives" (Virginians). The chief led his Cherokee in a raid on Black's Fort on the Holston River (now Abingdon, Virginia) on July 22, 1776, launching the Cherokee–American wars of 1776–94. Another Chickamauga leader Bob Benge also led raids in the westernmost counties of Virginia during these wars, until he was slain in 1794.

In August 1780, having lost ground to the British army in South Carolina fighting, the Catawba Nation fled their reservation and temporarily hid in an unknown spot in Virginia. They may have occupied the mountainous region around Catawba, Virginia, in Roanoke County, which had not been yet settled by European Americans. They remained there in safety around nine months, until American general Nathanael Greene led them to South Carolina, after the British were pushed out of that region near the end of the revolution.

In the summer of 1786, after the United States had gained independence from Great Britain, a Cherokee hunting party fought a pitched two-day battle with a Shawnee one at the headwaters of the Clinch River in present-day Wise County, Virginia. Cherokee prevailed, although losses were heavy on both sides. This was the last battle between these tribes within the present limits of Virginia.

Throughout the 18th century, several tribes in Virginia lost their reservation lands. Shortly after 1700, the Rappahannock tribe lost its reservation; the Chickahominy tribe lost theirs in 1718, and the Nansemond tribe sold theirs in 1792 after the American Revolution. Some of their landless members intermarried with other ethnic groups and became assimilated. Others maintained ethnic and cultural identification despite intermarriage. In their matrilineal kinship systems, a child of an Indian mother was born into her clan and family and considered Indian regardless of their fathers. By the 1790s, most of the surviving Powhatan tribes had converted to Christianity, and spoke only English.

=== 19th century ===
During this period, European Americans continued to push the Virginia Indians off the remaining reservations and sought to end their status as tribes. By 1850, one of the reservations was sold to the settlers, and another reservation was officially divided by 1878. Many Virginia Indian families held onto their individual lands into the 20th century. The only two tribes to resist the pressure and hold onto their communal reservations were the Pamunkey and Mattaponi tribes. These two tribes still maintain their reservations today.

After the American Civil War, the reservation tribes began to reclaim and assert their cultural identities. This was particularly important after the emancipation of slaves. The colonists and many white Virginians assumed that the many Indians of mixed race were no longer culturally Indian. But, they absorbed people of other ethnicities; especially if the mother was Indian, the children were considered to be members of her clan and tribe.

=== 20th century ===
In the early 20th century, many Virginia Indians began to reorganize into official tribes. They were opposed by Walter Ashby Plecker, the head of the Bureau of Vital Statistics in Virginia (1912–1946). Plecker was a white supremacist and a follower of the eugenics movement, which had racial theories related to mistaken ideas about the superiority of the white race. Given the history of Virginia as a slave society, he wanted to keep the white "master race" "pure." In 1924 Virginia passed the Racial Integrity Act (see below), establishing the one drop rule in law, by which individuals having any known African ancestry were to be considered African, or black.

Because of intermarriage and the long history of Virginia Indians not having communal land, Plecker believed there were few "true" Virginia Indians left. According to his beliefs, Indians of mixed race did not qualify, as he did not understand that Indians had a long practice of intermarriage and absorbing other peoples into their cultures. Their children may have been of mixed race but they identified as Indian. The U.S. Department of the Interior accepted some of these "non Indians" as representing all of them when persuading them to cede lands.

The 1924 law institutionalized the "one-drop rule", defining as black an individual with any known black/African ancestry. According to the Pocahontas Clause, a white person in Virginia could have a maximum blood quantum of one-sixteenth Indian ancestry without losing his or her legal status as white. This was a much more stringent definition than had prevailed legally in the state during the 18th and 19th centuries. Before the Civil War, a person could legally qualify as white who had up to one-quarter (equivalent to one grandparent) African or Indian ancestry. In addition, many court cases dealing with racial identity in the antebellum period were decided on the basis of community acceptance, which usually followed how a person looked and acted, and whether they fulfilled community obligations, rather than analysis of ancestry, which most people did not know in detail anyway.

A holdover from the slavery years and Jim Crow, which still prevailed in the racially segregated state, the act prohibited marriage between white and non-white people. It recognized only the terms of "white" and "colored" (which was related to ethnic African ancestry). Plecker was a strong proponent for the Act. He wanted to ensure that black people were not "passing" as Virginia Indians, in his terms. Plecker directed local offices to use only the designations of "white" or "colored" on birth certificates, death certificates, marriage certificates, voter registration forms, etc. He further directed them to evaluate some specific families which he listed, and to change the classification of their records, saying he believed they were black and trying to pass as Indian.

During Plecker's time, many Virginia Indians and African Americans left the state to escape its segregationist strictures. Others tried to fade into the background until the storm passed. Plecker's "paper genocide" dominated state recordkeeping for more than two decades, but declined after he retired in 1946. It destroyed much of the documentation that had shown families continuing to identify as Indian.

The Racial Integrity Act was not repealed until 1967, after the ruling of the US Supreme Court case Loving v. Virginia, which stated anti-miscegenation laws were unconstitutional. In the ruling the court stated: "The freedom to marry, or not marry, a person of another race lies with the individual and cannot be infringed by the State."

In the late 1960s, two Virginia organizations applied for federal recognition through the BAR under the Bureau of Indian Affairs. The Ani-Stohini/Unami first petitioned in 1968 and the Rappahannock filed shortly thereafter. The Rappahannock tribe was recognized by the State of Virginia. Today, at least 13 tribes in Virginia have petitioned for federal recognition.

With the repeal of the Racial Integrity Act, individuals were allowed to have their birth certificates and other records changed to note their ethnic American Indian identity (rather than Black or white "racial" classification), but the state government charged a fee. After 1997, when Delegate Harvey Morgan's bill HB2889 passed, any Virginia Indian who had been born in Virginia could have his or her records changed for free to indicate identity as Virginia Indian.

=== 21st century ===
The population of Powhatan Indians today in total is estimated to be about 8,500 to 9,500. About 3,000 to 3,500 are enrolled as tribal members in state-recognized tribes. The Monacan Indian Nation has tribal membership of about 2,000.

The Pamunkey and the Mattaponi are the only tribes in Virginia to have maintained their reservations from the 17th-century colonial treaties. These two tribes continue to make their yearly tribute payment to the Virginia governor, as stipulated by the 1646 and 1677 treaties. Every year around Thanksgiving they hold a ceremony to pay the annual tribute of game, usually a deer, and pottery or a ceremonial pipe.

In 2013, the Virginia Department of Education released a 25-minute video, "The Virginia Indians: Meet the Tribes," covering both historical and contemporary Native American life in the state.

The Rappahannock tribe purchased back a part of their ancestral homeland April 1, 2022. The tribe substantially increased their holdings January 2023.

== Unrecognized organizations ==
More than a dozen unrecognized organizations claim to be Native American tribes, including many Cherokee heritage groups. These groups are neither federally or state-recognized tribes. One such organization, the Ani-Stohini/Unami Nation petitioned the federal government for recognition; however, their petition has not been resolved.

== See also ==
- Native American agriculture in Virginia
- Unrecognized tribes in Virginia

== Suggested reading ==
- Bruce, Philip Alexander (1896). Economic History of Virginia in the Seventeenth Century. Vol. I. New York: MacMillan and Co.
- Fiske, Warren (August 18, 2004). "The Black and White World of Walter Ashby Plecker". The Virginian Pilot.
- Kimberlain, Joanne (June 10, 2009). "SPECIAL REPORT: Virginia's Indians, three-part series". The Virginian Pilot. Archived from the original on April 18, 2012.
- Kupperman, Karen Ordahl (1980). Settling with the Indians: The Meeting of the English and the Indian Cultures in America, 1580–1640. Rowman and Littlefield. ISBN 978-0460044950.
- Richter, Daniel K. (2003). Facing East from Indian Country: A Native History of Early America. Harvard University Press. ISBN 978-0674011175.
- Rountree, Helen C., ed. (1993). Powhatan Foreign Relations: 1500–1722. University of Virginia Press. ISBN 9780813914091.
