= G. Anne Richardson =

Rappahannock Chief (born 1956)

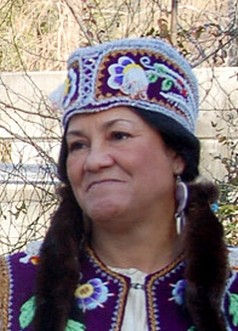

Chief, Rappahannock Tribe leader
- Preceded by: Chief Nelson

Personal details
- Born: 1956 (age 69–70) Indian Neck, Virginia
- Parent(s): Chief and Mrs. Captain Nelson

G. Anne Nelson Richardson (born 1956) is a Rappahannock woman and the first woman Chief to lead a tribe in Virginia since the 18th century.

== Biography ==
Nelson was born in 1956 to Chief and Mrs. Captain Nelson of Indian Neck, Virginia.

Anne was elected Assistant Chief to her father in 1980. She served in that position for eighteen years.

In 1989, Anne helped to organize the United Indians of Virginia, which was established as an intertribal organization represented by all tribal Chiefs.

In 1991, Richardson became executive director of Mattaponi-Pamunkey-Monacan, Inc., that provides training and employment services for Virginia Indians.

In 1998, Anne was elected the first woman Chief to lead a tribe in Virginia since the 18th century, by the Rappahannock Tribe. She is a fourth generation chief in her family. Under her tenure as Chief, in 1998, the Tribe purchased 119.5 acres (0.484 km^{2}) to establish a land trust, retreat center, and housing development. The Tribe also built their first model home and sold it to a tribal member in 2001. The Rappahannocks are currently engaged in a number of projects ranging from cultural and educational to social and economic development programs, all geared to strengthen and sustain their community.

In 2005, Chief Anne was ordained by Pastor Sally Beckman at Living Waters Fellowship. She, also, became chair of the Native American Employment and Training Council. She was elected as Chairman of the Council, working with the Secretary to further the goals of 'Indian Country through Labor Programs'.

In 2006, she was invited, along with other Virginia natives, to attend the various ceremonies leading up to the English 2007 events, commemorating the anniversary of the founding of the first permanent English settlement in America in Jamestown, Virginia. Also in 2006, Anne Richardson launched Restoring Nations International, a ministry whose mission is "to restore honor and human dignity by facilitating reconciliation and bringing healing to Native American and other indigenous nations around the world through ministering God's love, purpose and destiny for those nations."

Richardson was named one of the Virginia Women in History for 2006.

== News articles ==
- BBC Radio interview: Chief G. Anne Richardson
- Virginia's First People - Profile
- Library of Virginia - Virginia Women in History
