= Patawomeck =

Historical Native American town and tribe in Virginia, U.S.

Total population
- 1608 (est.): 800

Regions with significant populations
- Virginia

Languages
- Patawomeck

Religion
- Christianity, Indigenous religion

Related ethnic groups
- Conoy, Chickahominy, Rappahannock, Piscataway

The Patawomeck are a Native American tribe based in Stafford County, Virginia, who historically lived on the south side the Potomac River. Patawomeck is another spelling of Potomac, which was a 17th-century town in present-day Stafford County, Virginia.

In the 17th century, during the early English colonisation, the Patawomeck were an ally of the Powhatan Confederacy. At times, it was allied with others in the confederacy, and at others, the Patawomeck allied with the English colonists.

The Patawomeck Indian Tribe of Virginia is a state-recognized tribe in Virginia that identifies as descendants of the Patawomeck.

== Name ==
The name of the town and the tribe, Patomeck, translates as "something brought" and has been spelled Potomac, Patawomeck, Patawoenicke, Patawomekes, Patamack, Patowomek, Satawomeck, and other variations.

== Language ==
The Patawomeck speak the Patawomeck language, an Eastern Algonquian language. The Patawomeck were one of 32 Algonquian-speaking peoples in the Tidewater area of present-day Virginia. Their language is being revitalized through language classes.

=== State-recognized tribe ===
The language is being revitalized by the state-recognized tribe known as the Patawomeck Indian Tribe of Virginia. Classes use the audio and printed materials prepared by the linguist Blair Rudes for cast members who portrayed Native Americans in the film, The New World. Rudes attempted to reconstruct the Algonquian language as it was spoken in coastal Virginia in the early 17th century.

== History ==
=== Precontact and archaeological studies ===
For thousands of years, various woodland nations lived along the Potomac River and its tributaries in the coastal area. Archeological excavations have found many items used by pre-contact peoples. At Indian Point on Potomac Creek, for instance, archeological excavations in the 1930s revealed a burial ground (Potomac Creek, 44ST2).

More recently, a 1996 archaeological study by the College of William and Mary revealed Native American artifacts dating back to the 15th century. More than 10,000 artifacts were recovered, mostly pottery sherds of the "wrapped-cord type" common among local indigenous people. While the ancient village site is protected under historic preservation laws, the land is being steadily eroded by the creek. The coastal peoples were mostly speakers Algonquian languages and lived in countless weroancies.

The historical Patawomeck tribe was loosely allied with the powerful Powhatan Confederacy. They were an agrarian people who cultivated varieties of maize. They also relied on hunting, fishing, and gathering resources from their cultivated environment.

=== 17th century ===
The first recorded European encounter was that of the English leader Captain John Smith, who visited the people in 1608 in their homeland, between Aquia Creek and Upper Machodoc Creek. He noted they were cultivating 1,000 acres (4.0 km^{2}) of corn along the Potomac River. The Patawomeck main town, also called Patawomeck, was located on the north of Potomac Creek, in present-day Stafford County. The Weroance of Passapatanzy, a neighbouring village, was Japazeus (also spelt Japazaws or Iopassus), older brother to the main Weroance.

The town Potomac was on a peninsula bordering the Potomac River and Potomac Creek. At the time of first English contact, the town's Weroance, or leader, rivalled Powhatan in power and influence. Henry Spelman of Jamestown, an English interpreter who learned the Powhatan language, joined the Weroance's household and called him King Patomecke.

The Patawomeck were mostly independent of the Powhatan Confederacy to the south. They befriended the English colonists (Captain Samuel Argall in particular), often providing them crucial assistance when the Powhatan would not. When the colonists faced starvation at Jamestown in 1609, Francis West was sent to buy corn from the Patawomeck. In a violent confrontation, he beheaded two of them and fled in his pinnace to England.

==== Peace deal with the English ====
Argall made peace with the Patawomeck in 1612, during the First Anglo-Powhatan War. According to contemporary accounts by Ralph Hamor and others, on 13 April 1613, Argall, with the connivance of Japazaw in exchange for a copper kettle, was able to capture Powhatan's daughter Pocahontas, who lived with the Patawomeck tribe for three years. Argall was on a goods trading mission for her father.

Englishman William Strachey, secretary and recorder for the Colony of Virginia in 1610 and 1611, recorded that Pocahontas had been living married to a "private captaine called Kocoum" for two years, as of 1610–11. Strachey returned to England in 1611 and later published a book on his travels. His book is considered the primary source of information on this period of Virginia history and Native peoples of the region.

The Patawomeck continued to ally with the English in their conflicts with the Powhatan in 1622 (even after Captain Isaac Madison took their weroance prisoner), and in 1644. After settlers began moving into their area in the 1650s, pressures mounted in competition over resources and differing ideas of how to use land. Violent disputes followed. In 1662, Colonel Giles Brent took their Weroance, Wahanganoche, prisoner. After an extensive trial in Williamsburg, Wahanganoche was found not guilty and released. He was nonetheless murdered by Giles' conspirators in 1663 while returning home from the trial. In October 1665, the colonial government forced the tribe to sell their remaining land to the colony for a few matchcoats.

In 1660, the Piscataway said they had been a tributary tribe to the Patawomeck.

==== Conflict with the English and aftermath ====
In 1666, after continued conflicts, the English colonists declared war against several tribes in the Northern Neck, including the Patawomeck. The English attempted to appoint a new chief for the Patawomeck and they refused when Wahunganoche left and was taken as prisoner. His brother Ninj apatanuiwak took the position of chief until he was returned. After this, the Patawomeck disappeared from the historical record. A silver badge, issued to Wahanganoche in 1662, was found in a contemporary archaeological excavation near Portobago (or Portobacco) on the Rappahannock River. It may indicate that the survivors merged with the Portobacco tribe, as did remnants of several other tribes.

=== 20th century ===
In 1928, the anthropologist Frank Speck wrote of the Native American population living around the original Patawomeck capital. From his studies of the Algonquian-speaking peoples, he believed they were remnants of the old Patawomeck nation. Although without solid proof they were not from another tribe, he called them the "Potomac". Many families living in and around White Oak in Stafford County had oral histories linking them to the Patawomecks; these included families with the names Sullivan, Newton, Green, Bourne, Bullock, Fines, and Curtis.

== State-recognized tribe ==
The Patawomeck Indian Tribe of Virginia is one of Virginia's eleven state-recognized tribes; however, it is not federally recognized as a Native American tribe. The group achieved state recognition in February 2010 and had approximately 2,300 members in 2014. They are trying to revive the historic Algonquian language.

== Patawomeck remains and NAGPRA ==
At a local archaeological site, researchers sent 134 exhumed human remains from the grounds to the Smithsonian Institution. The state-recognized Patawomeck tribe may undertake claiming the remains for repatriation and burial under NAGPRA, though a tribe has to be federally recognized to utilize NAGPRA without extra petitioning. In 2022, The Valentine reported making three of its four Native American remains available for return to several tribes in Virginia and the broader USA, including the Patawomeck Indian Tribe of Virginia.

== See also ==
- Nanzatico, a 16th- and 17th-century intertribal settlement where some Patawomecks lived
- The Historie of Travaile into Virginia Britannia
