= Indian Neck =

Indian Neck is the name of at least three locations in the United States, two of them in New England and one in Virginia:

- Indian Neck (Cape Cod) is an area of Wareham and Wellfleet, Massachusetts
- Indian Neck is a village in the town of Branford, Connecticut.
- Indian Neck, Virginia is a road name in Newtown, Virginia.
