= Ajacán Mission =

1570 Spanish Jesuit mission in pre-colonial Virginia; massacred by natives in 1571

The Ajacán Mission (Spanish pronunciation: [axaˈkan]) (also Axaca, Axacam, Iacan, Jacán, Xacan) was a Spanish attempt in 1570 to establish a Jesuit mission in the vicinity of the Virginia Peninsula to show Christianity to the Virginia Native Americans. The effort to found St. Mary's Mission predated the founding of the English settlement at Jamestown, Virginia, by about 36 years. In February 1571, the entire party was massacred by natives, except for Alonso de Olmos. The following year, a Spanish party from Florida went to the area, rescued Alonso, and killed several native Americans in retaliation.

== Spanish exploration ==
Early in the 16th century, Spanish explorers were the first recorded Europeans to see the mouth of the Chesapeake Bay, which the Spanish called Bahía de Madre de Dios or Bahía de Santa Maria. They were searching for a Northwest Passage to India, and they named the land Ajacán, also called "Jacán" by Luis Jerónimo de Oré.

The Spanish succeeded in founding a stable settlement in 1565 at St. Augustine, Florida, the first founded by Europeans in what would become the United States of America. In 1566, they established a military outpost and the first Jesuit mission in Florida on an island near Mound Key, called San Antonio de Carlos. They subsequently established small Spanish outposts along the eastern coast into Georgia and the Carolinas, the northernmost at Santa Elena on Parris Island off Port Royal, South Carolina. From there, Juan Pardo was commissioned to lead expeditions into the interior looking for a route to Mexican silver mines. He founded Fort San Juan in 1567–68 at the regional chiefdom of Joara as the first European settlement in the interior of North America in western North Carolina and five other interior garrisons.

In 1561, an expedition sent by Ángel de Villafañe kidnapped a Native American boy from the Chesapeake Bay region and took him to Mexico. The boy was instructed in the Catholic religion and baptized Don Luis, in honor of Luís de Velasco, the Viceroy of New Spain. The Spanish took him to Madrid, Spain, where he had an audience with the King and received a thorough Jesuit education. Some Dominicans heading for Florida as missionaries took Don Luis with them, stopping at Havana where they abandoned their plans for Florida.

== Mission ==
In 1570, Father Juan Bautista de Segura was the Jesuit vice provincial of Havana, Cuba. He had just withdrawn the Jesuit missionaries from Guale and Santa Elena. He wanted to found a mission in Ajacán without a military garrison, which was unusual. His superiors expressed concerns but permitted him to establish what was to be called St. Mary's Mission. In August, he set out with Father Luis de Quirós, former head of the Jesuit college among the Moors in Spain, six Jesuit brothers. A Spanish boy named Alonso de Olmos called Aloncito. Don Luis went with them to serve as their guide and interpreter. They stopped at Santa Elena for provisioning.

On September 10, the party landed in Ajacán on the north shore of one of the lower Chesapeake peninsulas. They constructed a small wooden hut with an adjoining room where Mass could be celebrated.

== Location undetermined ==
Historians have tried to determine the Ajacán Mission site, but no archeological evidence has been found to reach a firm conclusion. Some say that the location was at Queen's Creek on the north side of the Virginia Peninsula, near the York River. Recent findings suggest that it may have been in the village of Axacam on the New Kent side of Diascund Creek, near its confluence with the Chickahominy River. Another theory places St. Mary's Mission near the Occoquan River and Aquia Creek, in the territory of the Patawomeck tribe in Stafford County, Virginia. On October 27, 1935, a bronze tablet was unveiled at the Aquia Catholic cemetery in memory of the Jesuits, listing the slain's names. This site had a significant nearby Indian village, a navigable stream flowing from the north, and white cliffs. Stratford Hall also has white cliffs looming over the Potomac River near its confluence with the Chesapeake Bay and the Rappahannock River.

== Abandonment and massacre ==
Don Luis tried to locate his native village of Chiskiack, which he had not seen in ten years. He was said to recognize distant relatives among the Indians onshore, so the missionaries disembarked. He soon left the Jesuits, settling with his own people at a distance of more than a day's travel. When he failed to return, the Jesuits believed that he had abandoned them. They were frightened to be without anyone who knew the language, although they could barter for some food. The mid-Atlantic region was enduring a long period of drought which led to a famine.

Around February 1571, three missionaries went toward the village where they thought Don Luis was staying. Don Luis murdered them, then took other warriors to the main mission station where they killed the priests and the remaining six brothers, stealing their clothes and liturgical supplies. Only the young servant boy Alonso de Olmos was spared, and he was put under the care of a chief.

== Aftermath and veneration ==
A Spanish supply ship went to the mission in 1572. Men came out in canoes dressed in clerical garb and tried to get them to land, then attacked. The Spaniards killed several people, and the captives told them about the young Spanish boy who survived. They exchanged some of their captives for Alonso, who told them about the mission brothers' massacre. Floridian Jesuit Missionary Father Juan Rogel wrote an account to his superior Francis Borgia, dated August 28, 1572. That month, Floridian Governor Pedro Menéndez de Avilés arrived with armed forces from Florida to avenge the massacre of the Spanish and hoping to capture Don Luis. His forces never discovered Don Luis, but forcibly baptized and hanged eight other people.

The Spanish then abandoned plans for further activity in the region. Rogel noted that it was more densely settled than more southern areas of the East Coast and that the people lived in settlements. Remaining Jesuits were recalled from St. Augustine and sent to Mexico. In 1573, Spanish Florida's governor Pedro Menéndez de Márquez conducted further exploration of the Chesapeake Bay but did not attempt further colonization. In 1587, English settlers tried to establish a colony on Roanoke Island off the Virginia coast. Relief supplies were delayed for nearly three years when Philip II of Spain attempted to invade England, and all available ships were pressed into service to repel the Spanish Armada. A relief ship finally arrived, but the Roanoke colonists had disappeared. The English did not found Jamestown until 1607.

The Martyrs have been declared Servants of God by the Catholic Church.

== See also ==
- History of Virginia
- List of Jesuit sites
- Spanish colonization of the Americas
- Timeline of the colonization of North America

== Bibliography ==
- Lowery, Woodbury. (1959) The Spanish Settlements within the Present Limits of the United States: Florida 1562–1574. Russell & Russell.
- Oré, Luís Gerónimo de, O. F. M. Translated by Maynard Geiger, O. F. M. "The Martyrs of Florida." In David Hurst Thomas. (1991) Ed. Spanish Borderlands Sourcebooks 23: The Missions of Spanish Florida. Garland Publishing, Inc.
