= Chickahominy =

Chickahominy may refer to

- Chickahominy people, a Native American tribe
- Chickahominy River, a river in eastern Virginia
- Chickahominy, a neighborhood in Greenwich, Connecticut
