= Powhatan =

Former Algonquian tribe from Virginia, U.S.

Powhatan people
Regions with significant populations
- extinct as a tribe

Languages
- Powhatan

Religion
- Powhatan religion, Christianity

Related ethnic groups
- Pamlico, Nanticoke, Lenape, Massachusett, and other Algonquian peoples

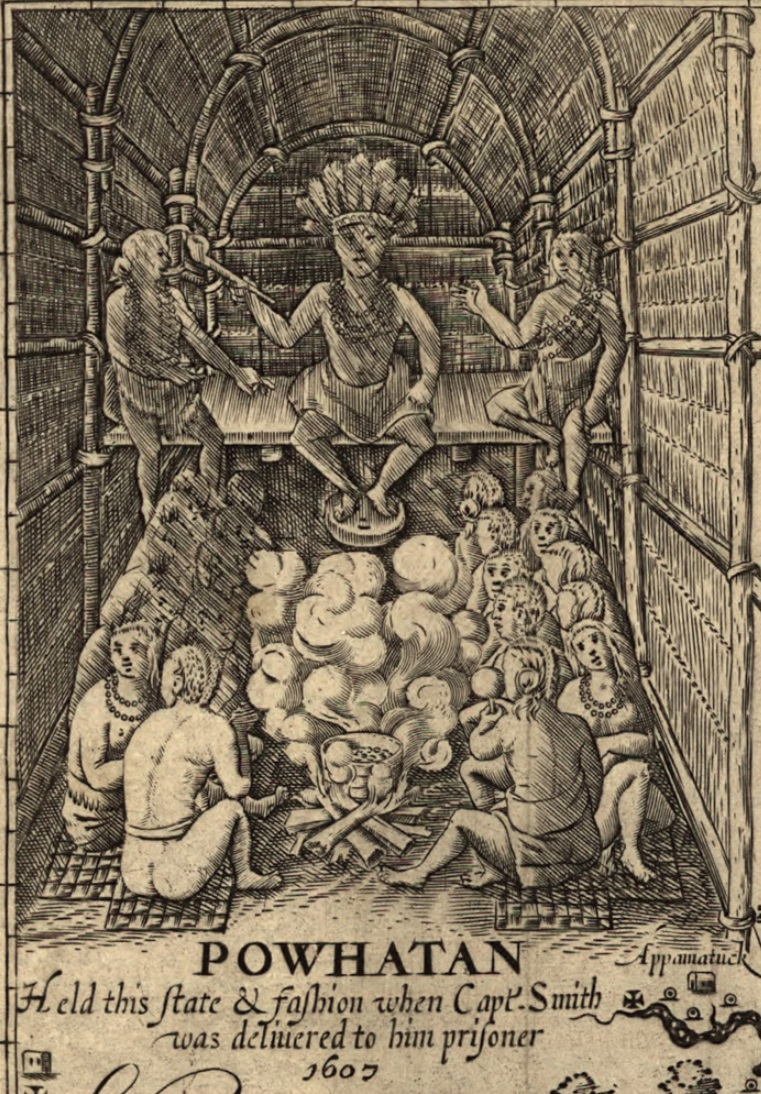
Powhatan in a longhouse at Werowocomoco (detail of John Smith map, 1612)

Powhatan people (/ˌpaʊhəˈtæn, paʊˈhætən/ POW-hə-TAN, pow-HAT-ən) were an Indigenous people of the Northeastern Woodlands. They were the leading member of the Powhatan Confederacy in Tsenacommacah, whose historic territories are in central Tidewater Virginia along the James River. The Powhatan people spoke the Powhatan language, which is a member of the Algonquian language family. The Powhatan tribe was governed by its own Weroance while also being led by the leader of the Confederacy, called the Mamanatowick. At the time of contact the Weroance of the Powhatan was "Parahunt".

== Naming and terminology ==
The name "Powhatan", also spelled Powatan, is the name of the Powhatan people and tribe. The group takes its name from the location Pawat-hanne, or "falls in a stream".

In modern times, the Powhatan Hill neighborhood in the East End portion of the modern-day city of Richmond, Virginia, is believed to be near the original Pawat-hanne town. Tree Hill Farm in Henrico County is also a possible site. Regardless, the use of "Powhatan" by English colonists as a personal title is believed to have been derived from the name of this site.

Powhata was also the name used by the Powhatan people to refer to the river where the town sat at the head of navigation, at the fall line in present-day Richmond, Virginia. The English colonists renamed the river to the James River after King James I. The only water body in Virginia to retain a name related to the Powhatan people is Powhatan Creek, located in James City County near Williamsburg. Powhatan County and its county seat at Powhatan, Virginia, were honorific names established centuries later.

== Early history ==
The Powhatan tribe was governed by a Weroance (man) or Weroansqua (woman), meaning "commander". Their Weroance at contact was Parahunt, son of Powhatan. The tribe had about 40 warriors (translated to 135 citizens - according to Smith) or 50 warriors (translating to 165 citizens - according to Strachey), according to Feest, up to 300 citizens is likely due to the number of settlements. As early as the era of John Smith, the Powhatan were recognized by English colonists as being the leading member of a much larger confederacy led by a Mamanatowick; the titleholder at the time was Wahunsenacawh. Wahunsenacawh had inherited control over six nations (including his own, the Powhatan) from his mother but governed more than 30 by 1607, when the English settlers established their Virginia Colony at Jamestown. The original six tribes under Wahunsenacawh were: the Powhatan (proper), the Arrohattoc, the Appamattuck, the Pamunkey, the Mattaponi, and the Chiskiack.

Some other members included the Rappahannock, Moraughtacund, Weyanoak, Paspahegh, Quiyoughcohannock, Kecoughtan, Warraskoyack, and Nansemond. Another tribe, the Chickahominy, managed to preserve their independence from the Confederacy.

=== English settlers in the land of the Powhatan ===
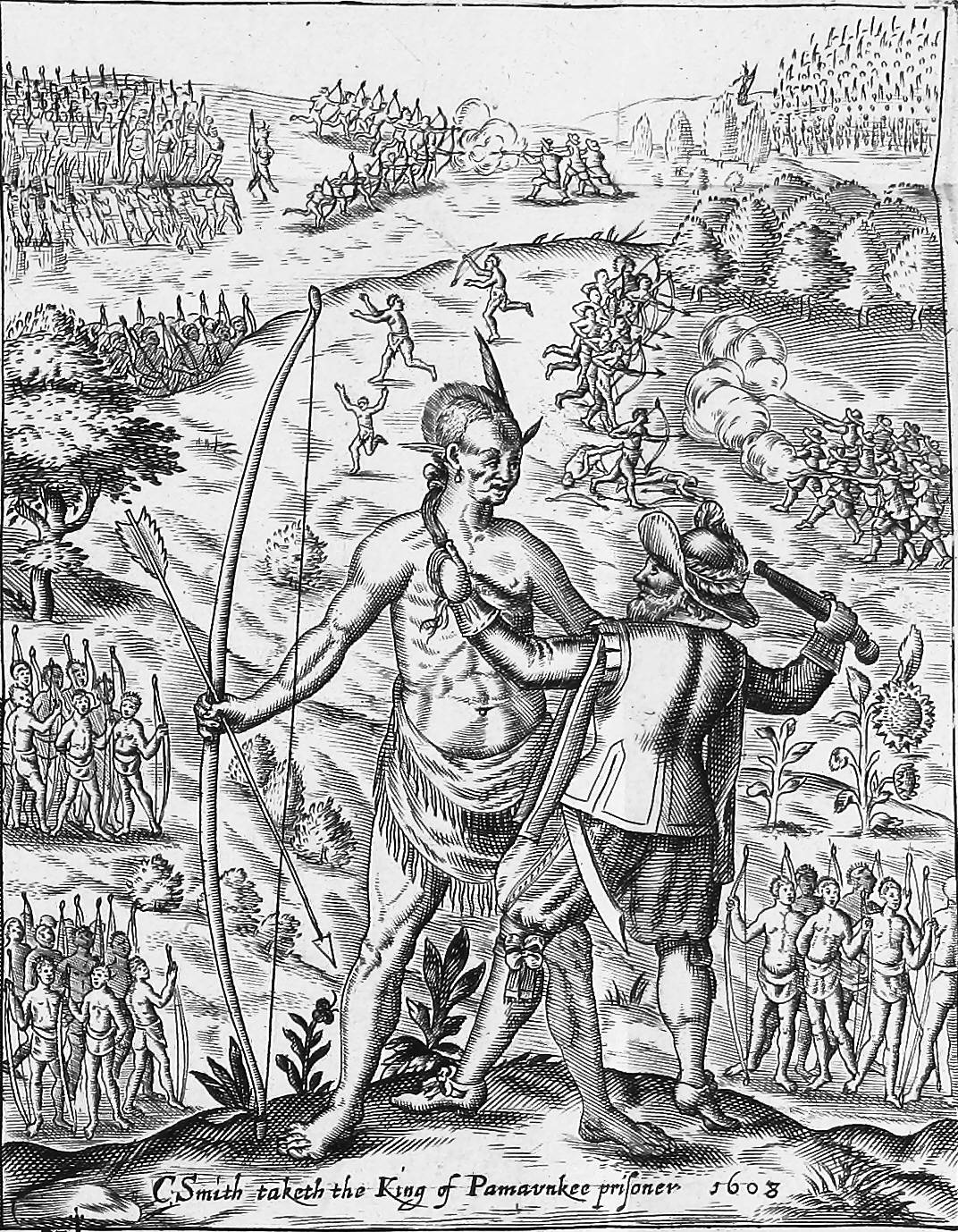
'John Smith taking the King of Pamunkey prisoner', a fanciful image of Opechancanough from Smith's General History of Virginia (1624). The image of Opechancanough is based on a 1585 painting of another Native warrior by John White

Conflicts began immediately between the Powhatan people and English colonists; the colonists fired shots as soon as they arrived (due to a bad experience they had with the Spanish before their arrival). Within two weeks of the arrival of English colonists at Jamestown, deaths had occurred.

The settlers had hoped for friendly relations and had planned to trade with the Virginia natives for food. Captain Christopher Newport led the first colonial exploration party up the James River in 1607 when he met Parahunt, the Weroance of the Powhatan people. English colonists initially mistook him for the Mamanatowick, his father Wahunsenacawh, who led the entire confederacy. Settlers coming into the region needed to befriend as many Native Americans as possible due to their unfamiliarity with the land. Not too long after settling down, they realized the huge potential for tobacco. To grow more and more tobacco, they had to seize Native territory. There were immediate issues that resulted in 14 years of warfare.

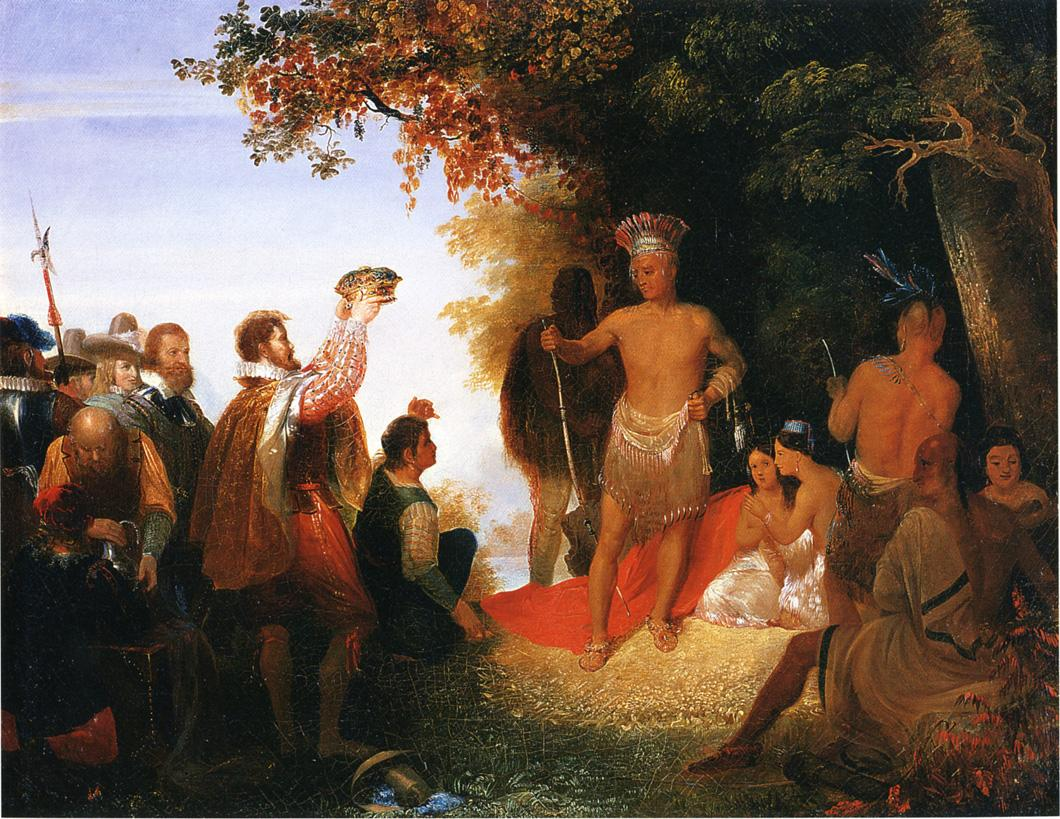
The Coronation of Powhatan, oil on canvas, John Gadsby Chapman, 1835

After John Smith became president of the colony, he sent a force under Francis West to build a fort at the James River Falls. He purchased the nearby fortified Powhatan town (present site of Richmond, Virginia) from Parahunt for some copper and an English colonist named Henry Spelman, who wrote a rare firsthand account of the Powhatan way of life. Smith then renamed the town to Nonsuch, and tried to get West's men to live in it. This attempt to settle beyond Jamestown soon failed, due to Powhatan resistance. Smith left Virginia for England in October 1609, never to return, because of an injury sustained in a gunpowder accident.

=== Anglo-Powhatan Wars and treaties ===
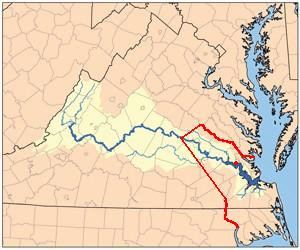
Red line shows the boundary between the Virginia Colony and Tributary Indian tribes, as established by the Treaty of 1646. The red dot on the river shows Jamestown, capital of Virginia Colony.

In 1644 the Powhatan people again attacked English colonial settlements to force them from Powhatan territories, which was again met with strong reprisals from the colonists, ultimately resulting in the near destruction of the tribe. The Second Anglo–Powhatan War that followed the 1644 incident ended in 1646 after Royal Governor of Virginia William Berkeley's forces captured Opechancanough, thought to be between 90 and 100 years old. While a prisoner, Opechancanough was killed, shot in the back by a soldier assigned to guard him. He was succeeded as Mamanatowick by Necotowance, and later by his daughter Cockacoeske. The Treaty of 1646 marked the dissolution of the Confederacy, as white colonists were granted an exclusive enclave between the York and Blackwater Rivers. In 1665, the House of Burgesses passed stringent laws requiring the Powhatan to accept chiefs appointed by the governor. After the Treaty of Albany in 1684, the Powhatan Confederacy all but been destroyed.

=== Extinction as a tribe ===
Educational programs established through the creation of the Indian School at the College of William and Mary in 1691 were a driving force behind assimilation. The College provided Powhatan boys with skills considered to be of little use by their people, however, literacy was generally viewed as a benefit of this Western education, and Powhatan boys who had received education at William and Mary sent their sons to the school.

By the mid-17th century, English colonists were desperate for laborers to colonize the Powhatan people's territory. Almost half of the European immigrants to Virginia arrived as indentured servants. As settlement continued, the colonists imported growing numbers of enslaved Africans for labor. By 1700, the colonies had about 6,000 enslaved Africans, one-twelfth of the population. Enslaved people would at times escape and join some of the surviving natives tribes in the region. African slaves and indentured European servants often worked and lived together, and while marriage was not always legal, some Powhatan people lived, worked, and had children with them. After Bacon's Rebellion in 1676, the colony enslaved Indians for control. In 1691, the House of Burgesses abolished the enslavement of Native peoples; however, many were held in servitude well into the 18th century.

The Powhatans had begun gambling, smoking tobacco, and consuming alcohol recreationally by the end of the 17th century. In the early 1700s, the Powhatan became extinct as a tribe with the survivors being adopted into neighboring nations.

== Geography ==
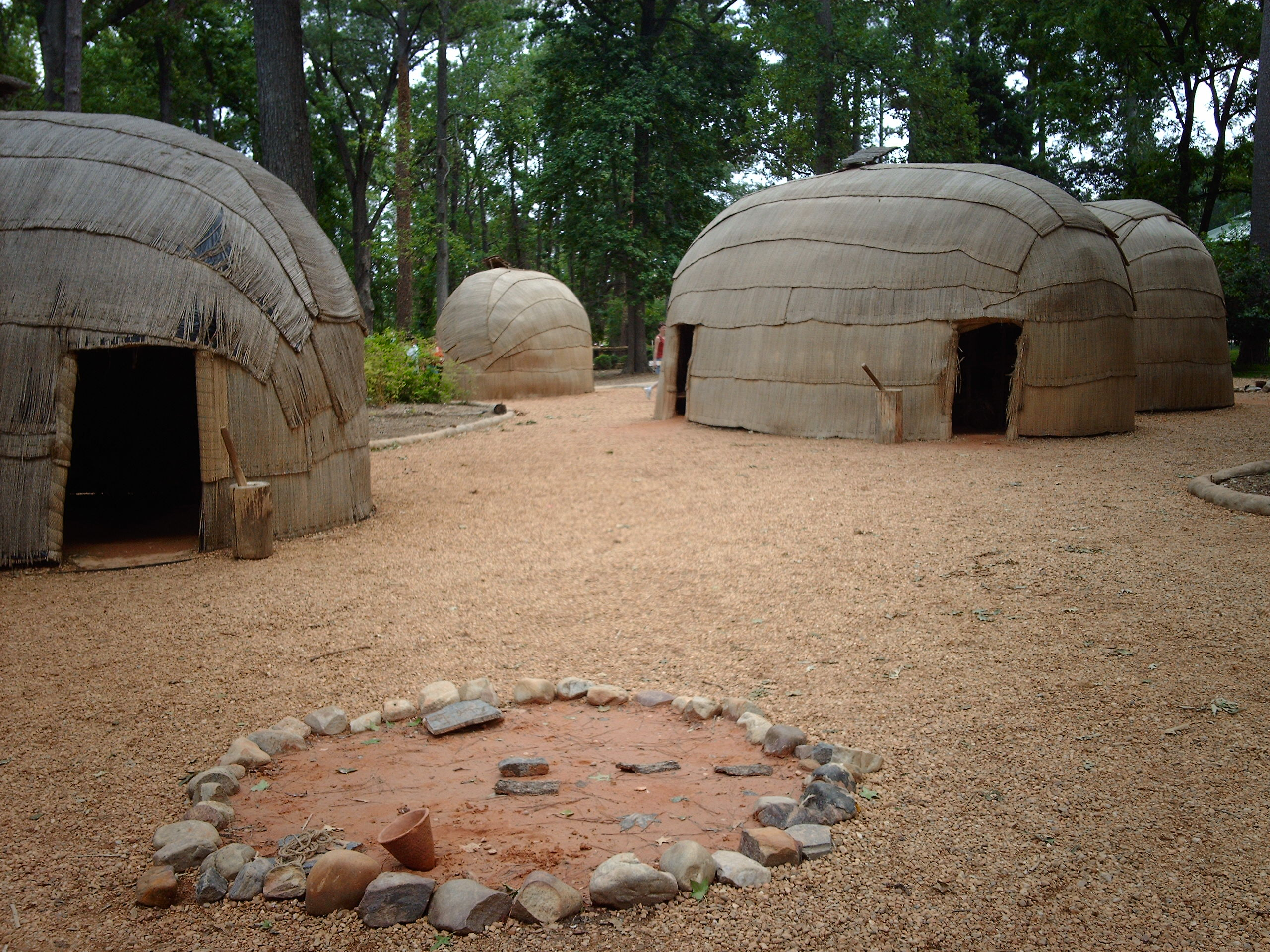
Reconstructed Powhatan town at the Jamestown Settlement living-history museum.

The Powhatan people lived east of the Atlantic Seaboard fall line on both sides of the Powhatan (James) River and north of the Kingsland Creek. Their capital called Powhatan or Paqwachowng (literally "town at the rapids") was close to the waterfalls (called Paqwachowng) in the vicinity of Richmond, the capital of Virginia. Outside of their capital they inhabited at least three other towns (according to Smith), Archer (1607a: 86) adds another village on Mayo Island in James River opposite of their capital, which he called Pawatahs Towre (Powhatan Town).

== Culture ==
The Powhatan people built their houses, called yehakins, by bending saplings and placing woven mats or bark over top of the saplings. They supported themselves primarily by growing crops, especially maize, but they also fished and hunted in the great forest in their lands. They primarily used fires to heat their sleeping rooms. As a result, less bedding was needed, and bedding materials could be easily stored during daytime hours. Couples typically slept head to foot.

Powhatan men were soldiers and hunters, while women were farmers and gatherers. The women were strong because of the hours they spent tending crops, pounding corn into meals, gathering nuts, and performing other vital jobs. When the men undertook extended hunts, the women went ahead of them to construct hunting camps. The Powhatan domestic economy depended on the labor of both sexes. Powhatan women would form work parties to accomplish tasks more efficiently. Women cut hair, furnished homes, and produced clothing. Overall, Powhatan women maintained independence in both their work lives and sexual lives. After a long day, the Powhatan people would celebrate and burn off any last energy they had by dancing and singing. This also allowed them to release any tensions they had from working.

The Powhatan practiced Three Sisters agriculture. They rarely moved their villages to different locations. To do this residents cleared the fields by felling, girdling, or firing trees at the base and then using fire to reduce the slash and stumps. To avoid declines in soil productivity, local fish and game stocks the inhabitants then moved on to allow the depleted area to revitalize, the soil to replenish, the foliage to grow, and the number of fish and game to increase. With every location change, the people used fire to clear new land. They left more cleared land behind. They also used fire to maintain extensive areas of open game habitat throughout the East, later called "barrens" by European colonists. The Powhatan also had rich fishing grounds. Bison had migrated to this area by the early 15th century.

Powhatans made offerings and prayed at sunrise. Although they also prayed and made offerings to specific spirits, who were believed to ensure a good harvest. They used the land differently, and their religion was a Native one. Significantly, one of the major duties of Powhatan priests was controlling the weather.

== Powhatan language ==
The Powhatan people spoke the Powhatan language, which is an Algonquian language. Their use became dormant due to the widespread deaths and social disruption suffered by the people. Much of the vocabulary is forgotten. Attempts have been made to reconstruct a language using sources such as word lists provided by Smith and by the 17th-century writer William Strachey.

== See also ==
- Native Americans in the United States
- Tribe (Native American)
