= Yehakin =

Traditional Native American longhouse

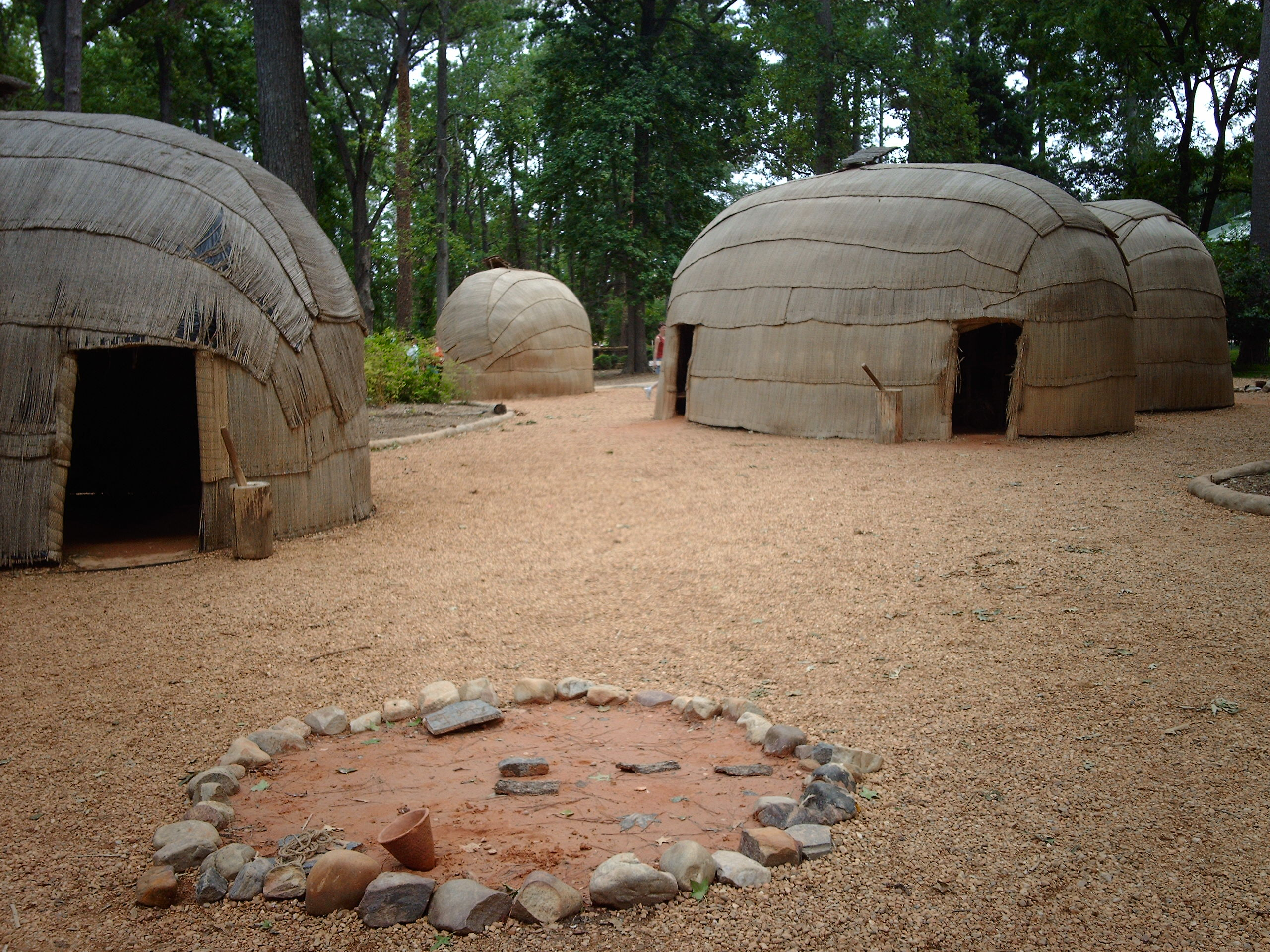
Yehakins in the Powhatan town recreated in the Jamestown settlement

A yehakin (also spelled yihakan, meaning "house" in the Powhatan language) is a dwelling that was traditionally used by the Powhatan and Pamunkey Native American tribes of Virginia. It is a type of longhouse constructed from wooden frames and covered with reed mats or bark, forming a rounded roof. The 17th-century historian William Strachey thought since bark was harder to acquire, families of higher status likely owned the bark-covered houses. In summer, when the heat and humidity increased, the people could roll up or remove the mat walls for better air circulation. The yehakins were traditionally built by women.

== See also ==
- Longhouses of the Indigenous peoples of North America
