= Don Luis =

16th-century Native American interpreter for the Spanish

Don Luís de Velasco
- Born: Paquiquino fl. 1561-1571
- Other name: Paquiquineo
- Known for: Interpreter/guide for the Spanish, Ajacán Mission

Don Luís de Velasco (fl. 1561-1571 Early Modern Spanish: [doŋ ˈlwis d̪e beˈlasko]), also known as Paquiquino (or Paquiquineo), and also simply Don Luis, was a Native American, possibly of the Kiskiack or Paspahegh people, from the area of what is now Tidewater, Virginia. In 1561 he was taken by a Spanish expedition. He traveled with them ultimately to Spain, Cuba, and Mexico where he was baptized as "Luís de Velasco" and educated. Don Luís returned to Virginia in 1571 as guide and interpreter for a party of Jesuit missionaries. He is believed to have taken part in a later massacre of the Jesuits at this site, when the region was struggling with famine.

Carl Bridenbaugh is one of the historians who have speculated that Don Luís was the same person as Opechancanough, younger half-brother (or close relative) of Powhatan (Wahunsenacawh), Mamanatowick of an Confederacy of Algonquian-speaking nations in the Tidewater. Opechancanough succeeded to the post of Mamanatowick and led two noted attacks on Jamestown settlers, one in 1622 and another in 1644, in an effort to expel them. The Virginia anthropologist Helen C. Rountree has suggested this is an unlikely coincidence, arguing that the Virginia Indians may have claimed otherwise "in an attempt to disavow their association with Opechancanough, whose memory was still so detested by the English due to the attack of 1622." Alternatively, Don Luís may have been the father of Powhatan who had arrived from Spanish dominion in the West Indies according to English accounts.

According to Mattaponi Oral history Don Luìs De Velasco was Wahunsenacawh.

== Virginia Indians ==
During the sixteenth century, the natives in Tidewater Virginia were Algonquian speakers. They lived in towns and villages located along the rivers feeding the Chesapeake Bay, and were ruled by chiefs, or weroances that were part of the Powhatan confederacy.

== Spanish exploration ==
Early in the 16th century, Spanish explorers arrived in the Chesapeake Bay while in search of the fabled Northwest Passage. They gave the land now known as Virginia the name Ajacán.

After several failed attempts at colonization of the portion of the New World now known that would later become the thirteen English colonies (and later the first United States), the Spanish succeeded in 1565 with the establishment of St. Augustine, the first European city in the territory of what is now the United States. Small settlements spread northward along the eastern coast into Georgia and the Carolinas. The northernmost post was Santa Elena in what is now South Carolina.

== Early life ==
Spanish exploration northward in the area of the Chesapeake Bay continued into the late 16th century. During an exploratory voyage in June 1561, ordered by Luís de Velasco, the second viceroy of New Spain, the caravel Santa Catalina, captained by Antonio Velázquez, entered the Chesapeake. Velázquez recruited two natives, thought to be a notable and a servant, to act as interpreters. One of the natives was Don Luís. The Spanish called him Paquiquino (little Francis) at first. In September 1561, he arrived in Seville, and subsequently traveled to Córdoba and Madrid where he had an audience with Philip II of Spain.

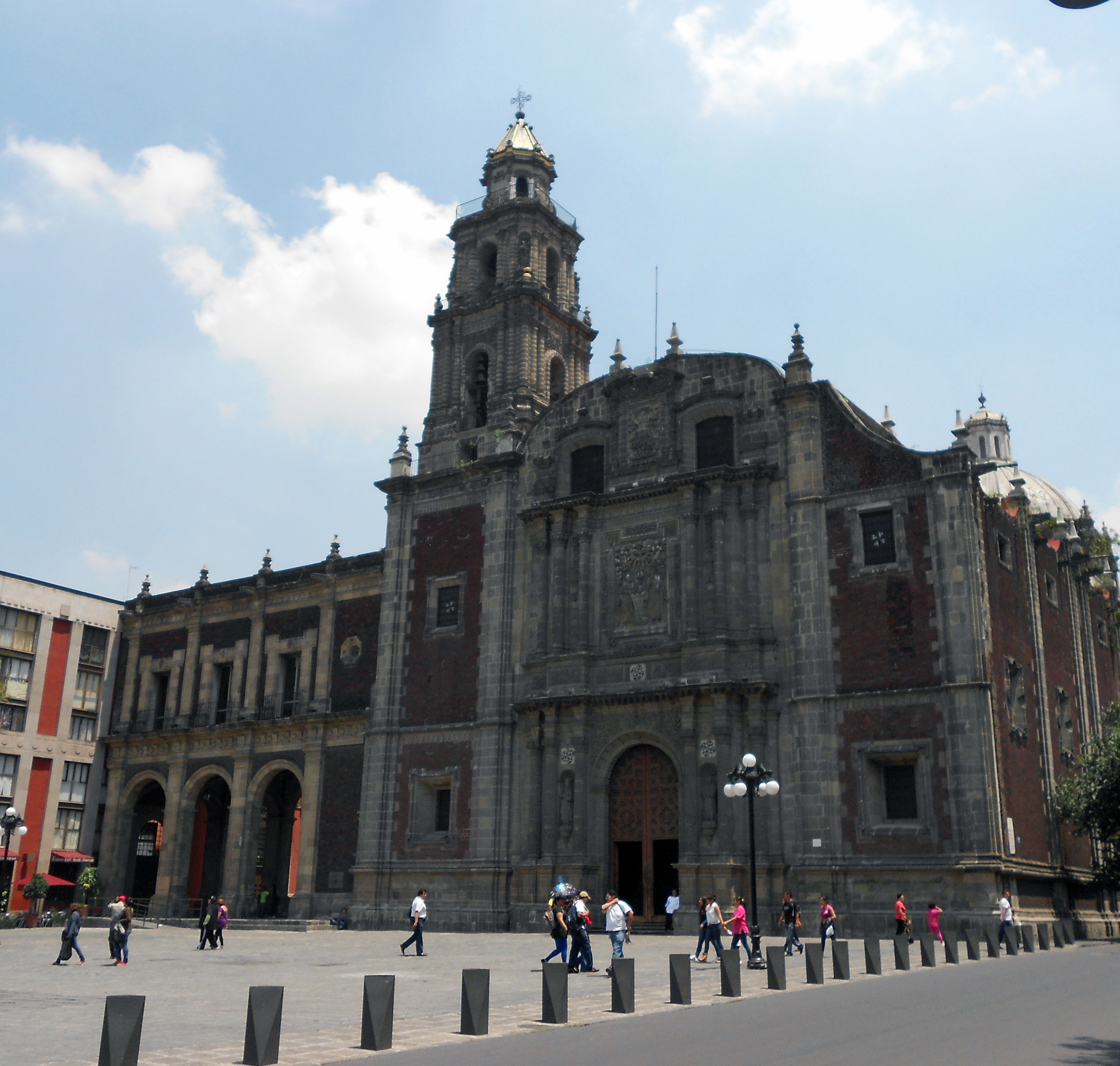
Santo Domingo convent, Mexico City

In August 1562, Don Luís arrived in Mexico City where he fell ill. He stayed at Santo Domingo convent in what is now Mexico City. Upon accepting baptism and taking the name of New Spain's acting viceroy, Don Luís de Velasco, he received care and recovered.

Though King Philip ordered him returned to North America, friars from the Dominican order in Mexico City denied Don Luís' repatriation. Against his wishes, the Dominican provincial fray Pedro de Feria refused to allow him passage home. Don Luís remained in Mexico until 1566, when King Philip commanded that he depart to Cuba and take part in an expedition to the Delmarva Peninsula.

== Ajacán Mission on Virginia's Lower Peninsula ==
In 1570, Father Juan Baptista de Segura, Jesuit vice provincial of Havana, wanted to establish a mission in Ajacán without a military garrison, which was unusual. One of the chief stumbling blocks to converting the natives to Christianity at other locations had been the often deplorable conduct of the colonial soldiers. On garrison duty, not challenged by the prospect of fighting, they were apt to seek an outlet for their boredom in drunkenness, thievery, bullying, and sexual license. Despite concerns about the plan's feasibility, Father Segura eventually obtained permission from his superiors for the founding of the new Ajacán Mission, which was to be called "St. Mary's Mission."

In August 1570, Father Segura, Father Luís de Quiros, former head of the Jesuit college among the Moors in Spain, and six Jesuit brothers set forth from their base in Havana to establish their new mission in Ajacán. A young Spanish boy, Alonso de Olmos, called Aloncito, also accompanied the priests to serve mass. They were also accompanied by Don Luís as their guide and translator. On September 10, Don Luís and nine Spaniards landed in the region now known as the Virginia Peninsula.

== Approximate location ==
It is possible the location they chose was at Queen's Creek on the north side of the Lower Peninsula, near the York River. More recent findings suggest that the mission may have been on the New Kent side of Diascund Creek near its confluence with the Chickahominy River.

Don Luís likely set about attempting to locate his native village which he had not seen in ten years. There, a small wooden hut was constructed with an adjoining room where mass could be celebrated. Soon after the ship bringing them had departed, Don Luís left the Jesuits, supposedly to seek his uncle and supplies.

== Abandonment, massacre ==
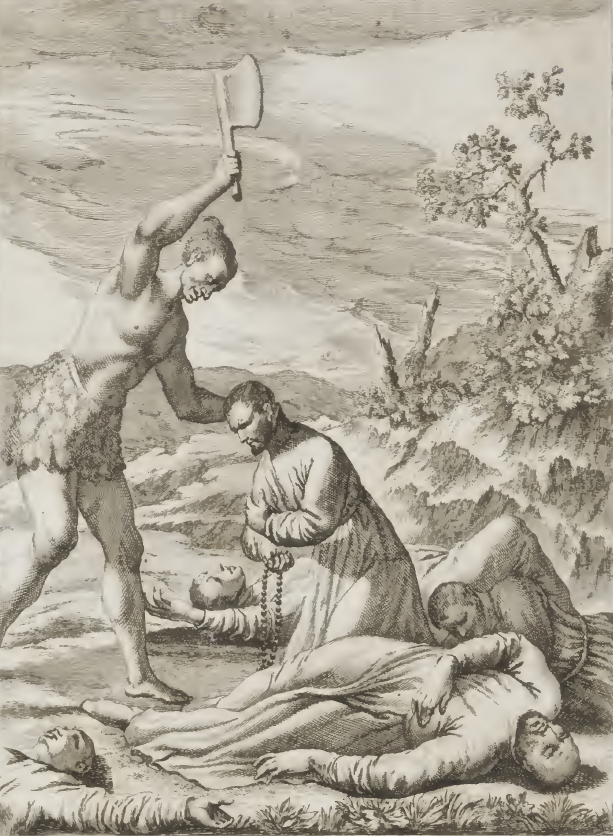
Martyrdom of Father Juan Baptista de Segura and Brothers Cristóbal Redondo, Pedro Mingot Linares, Gabriel Gómez, and Sancho de Zaballos, 1571

As time went by, first days, and then months, the eight Jesuits realized that they had been abandoned. To their added misfortune, it was a time when the mid-Atlantic region was enduring a long period of famine. The food they brought with them was in short supply. Immediately there was a dependence on the Indians for food.

They successfully traded with some natives for food, but it was increasingly in short supply as the winter months set in. Around February 1571, Don Luís returned with other natives and stole all their clothing and supplies. The natives killed both of the priests and all six brothers. Only Alonso de Olmos, the young servant boy, was spared. In 2002, Walter F. Sullivan, the 11th bishop of Richmond (1974–2003), initiated the cause of their canonization. This cause was later transferred to the Diocese of Pensacola-Tallahassee, which is seeking the canonization of all the martyrs of la Florida. The Jesuit Martyrs have been declared Servants of God by the Catholic Church.

== Survivor, retaliation, aftermath ==
In the spring of 1571, after the massacre at the Ajacán Mission, a Spanish supply ship arrived and found natives wearing the missionaries' garments and ornaments. Two natives were captured and interrogated, informing the crew of the massacre.

In August 1572, Pedro Menéndez de Aviles arrived from Florida with thirty soldiers and sailors to take revenge for the massacre. Initially, Menéndez de Avilés believed that Don Luís' uncle was responsible for the killings. He lured several natives aboard his ship with gifts and used them as hostages. From them, Menéndez de Avilés learned of Alonso de Olmos' survival and was able to secure the boy's return. After gaining a fuller picture of the massacre from Olmos, Menéndez de Avilés attempted to use other natives as hostages to bargain for the hand-over of Don Luís. Don Luís did not turn himself over to the Spanish.

Before leaving the bay, Menéndez de Avilés had the remaining native hostages baptized and hanged from the ships' yards. During the expedition, 20 natives were killed.

The failed attempt at establishing a mission in Virginia was the end of Spanish ventures to colonize the area. Don Luís subsequently disappeared from the historical record.

== Possible link between Don Luís and Opechancanough ==
At the time of the first permanent English settlement at Jamestown in 1607, a fierce Native American warrior named Opechancanough was the brother of Wahunsenacawh, the Chief of the Powhatan Confederacy. The name Opechancanough meant "He whose Soul is White" in the Algonquian language.

It has been speculated by some historians that Don Luís may have been Opechancanough. However, Paquiquino (Don Luis) was of the Paspahegh Tribe while Opechancanough was of the Pamunkey and Powhatan Tribes, they were not born of the same people. While both men are believed to have been born about the same time, and both have a reputation for being violently opposed to European settlers, Murrin suggests that Opechancanough was more likely the nephew or cousin of Don Luis.

== Possible father of Powhatan ==
Alternatively, some believe that Don Luís may have been the father of Wahunsenacawh aka Chief Powhatan. When discussing a treaty between the English and Powhatan Confederacy, Ralph Hamor records that Powhatan's father had arrived in Virginia from the Spanish West Indies, a curious fact that matches the life of Don Luís:

"Thirdly they should at all times be ready and willing to furnish vs with three or foure hundred bowmen to aide vs against the Spaniards, whose name is odious amongst them, for Powhatans father was driuen by them from the west-Indies into those parts..." - Ralph Hamor, A TRVE DISCOVRSE of the present estate of Virginia, and the successe of the affaires there till the 18 of Iune. 1614.

Based on this possibility, Frank T. Siebert Jr. speculates that Don Luis' experience observing Spanish rule contributed to the later founding of the Powhatan Confederacy by uniting six tribes before of his presumable death around 1583-1585, at which point Wahunsenacawh could have succeeded him.

The belief that Don Luis could be Wahunsenacawh's father is flawed, however, for it is not chronologically possible. Paquinquineo was a youth when he was kidnapped by the Spanish, and is thought to have been born between 1540 and 1550. The Spanish liked young captives who could easily learn the Spanish language and still remember their native languages. Wahunsenacawh is believed to have been born about 1547. John Smith estimated that he was born in 1547, while William Strachey thought he could have been born as early as 1527. Therefore, Wahunsenacawh was either older than or of the same age as Don Luis. Additionally, the Powhatan Indians were a matrilineal society, Wahunsenacawh explained to the English that he inherited his right to rule from his mother, and that his siblings, not his own children, would succeed him. Based upon this, it is believed that the chief before Wahunsenacawh was likely his uncle, but certainly not his father.

== Modern times ==
Descendants of the Powhatan Confederacy live on in Virginia in many places, including two reservations in King William County. The Roman Catholic Diocese of Richmond has designated St. Elizabeth Ann Seton Parish in New Kent County as the new shrine of the Jesuit martyrs.

== See also ==
- History of Virginia
- Spanish colonization of the Americas
