= Indian Neck, Virginia =

Unincorporated community in Virginia, United States

- Unincorporated community
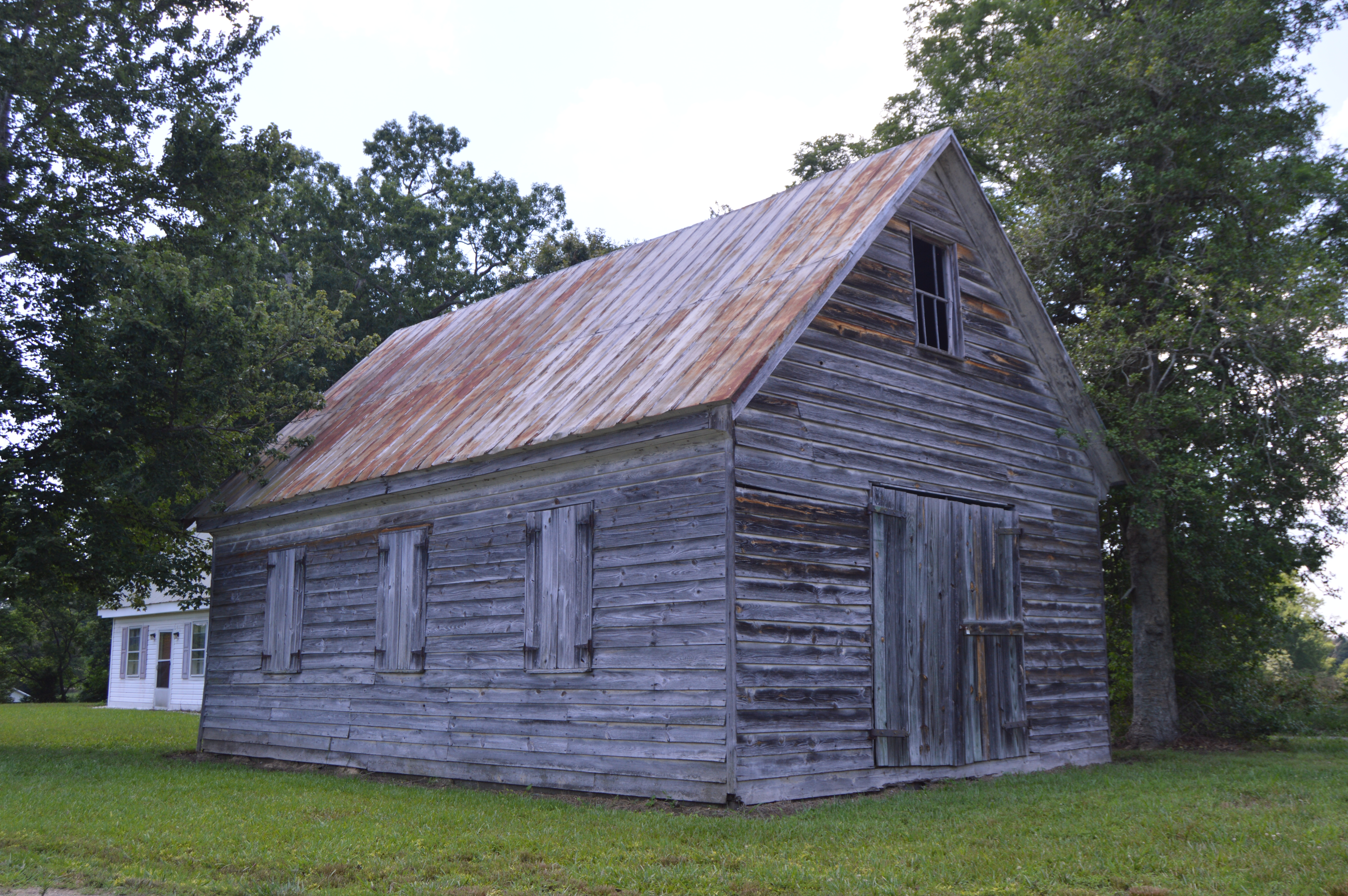
- Disused building at the central intersection

- Location within the Commonwealth of Virginia Indian Neck (the United States)
- Coordinates: 37°54′07″N 77°02′00″W
- Country: United States
- State: Virginia
- County: King and Queen
- Time zone: UTC−5 (Eastern (EST))
  - Summer (DST): UTC−4 (EDT)

Indian Neck is an unincorporated community in King and Queen County, Virginia, United States.

Indian Neck is also home to the Rappahannock tribe of Algonquin Native Americans, who incorporated in 1921 and achieved recognition as a tribe from the Commonwealth of Virginia in 1983. Federal recognition was achieved 24 years later with the passage of H.R. 984, the Thomasina E. Jordan Indian Tribes of Virginia Federal Recognition Act of 2017.
