= Ani-Stohini/Unami =

Cultural heritage group in Virginia

- Type: unrecognized tribe
- Locations: Fries, Virginia; Ivanhoe, Virginia
- Members: 350

The Ani-Stohini/Unami is a cultural heritage group based in Virginia.

== History ==
In the 1960s, the group took the name Ani-Stohini/Unami. Their original petition for federal recognition in 1968 was lost during the take over of the Bureau of Indian Affairs by the American Indian Movement in 1972, according to Holly Reckord, the former director of BAR.

While they identify as being Native American, they are an unrecognized organization. They are neither state-recognized nor federally recognized as a Native American tribe.

The 2010 US Census listed Tla Wilano and Ani-Stohini among its potential American Indian tribes, which was used in the census's 2020 consultation meetings. The US Census is self-reported, meaning there is no independent verification of an individual's claim of Native identity.

== Petition for federal recognition ==
Misty Dawn Thomas submitted a letter on behalf of the Ani-Stohini/Unami Nation of intent to petition for Federal Acknowledgment of Existence as an Indian Tribe through the Bureau of Indian Affairs (BIA) in the Department of the Interior that was received in 1994. They were listed as petitioner #150, however, the organization never followed through with the petition for federal recognition and their address was marked as invalid.

== State recognition ==
The State of Virginia does not recognize the organization as a Native American tribe.

== Activities ==
Leaders of the Ani-Stohini/Unami attended six White House meetings for non-federally recognized tribes during the Clinton Administration. This group worked with southwest Virginia U.S. Congressman Rick Boucher on several environmental issues, and during the application process, Senator John Warner wrote letters to the Interior Department on the tribe's behalf. In addition, the tribe lobbied the US Department of the Interior to protect the Appalachian Mountain Bog turtle.
