= Patawomeck Indian Tribe of Virginia =

State-recognized tribe in Virginia, U.S.

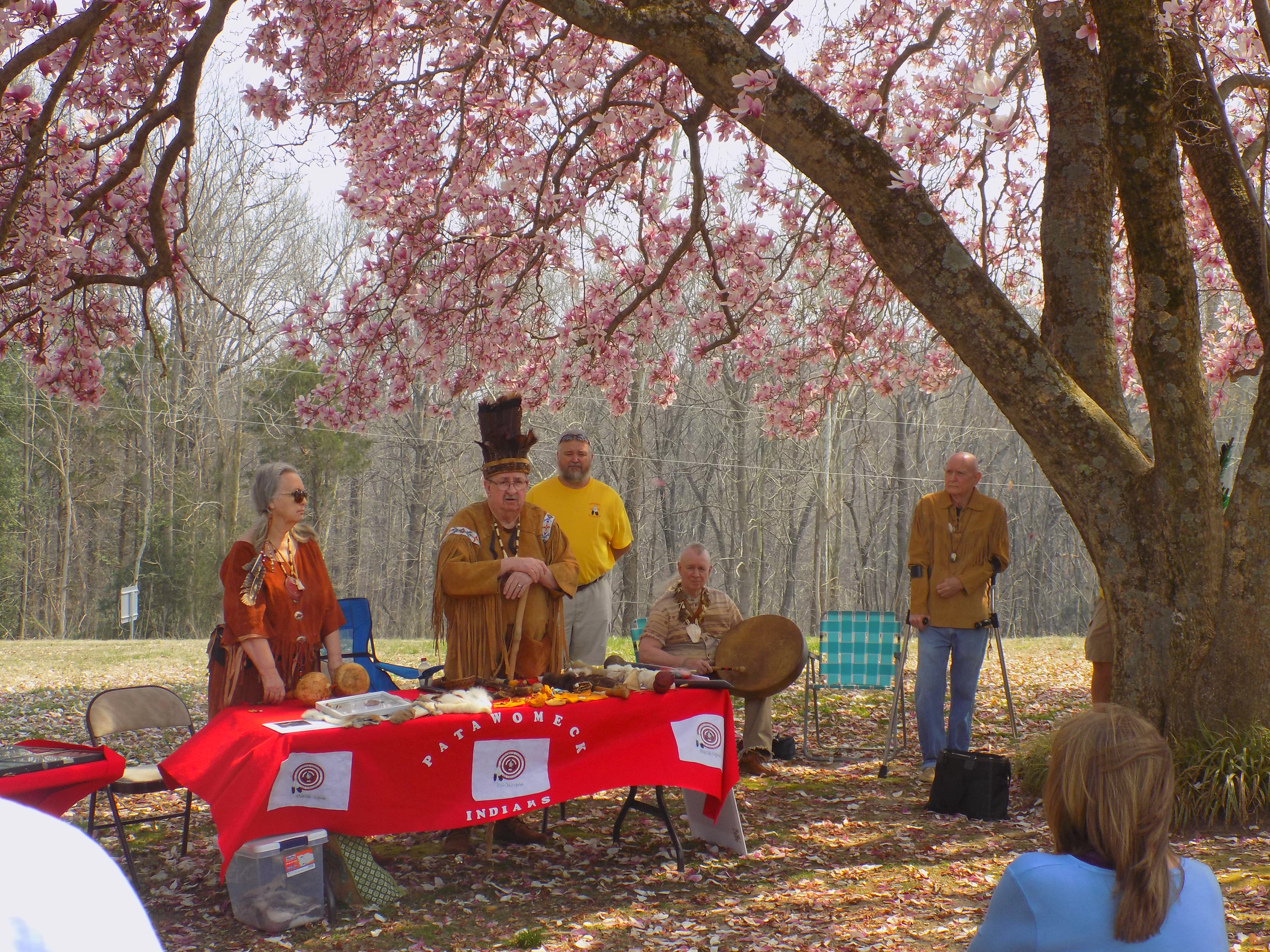
- Members of the Patawomeck Indian Tribe of Virginia at Caledon State Park, Virginia
- Named after: Patawomeck people, American Indians
- Formation: 2014
- Type: state-recognized tribe (2010), nonprofit organization (2014)
- Tax ID no.: EIN 47-1481316 (Patawomeck Indian Tribe of Virginia); EIN 27-1379012 (Patawomeck Heritage Foundation)
- Purpose: A23: Cultural, Ethnic Awareness
- Headquarters: Stafford County, Virginia
- Location: Fredericksburg, Virginia, United States
- Members: 2,600 (2023)
- Official language: English
- President: Charles Bullock (2024)
- Revenue: $116,481 (2024)
- Expenses: $128,455 (2024)
- Website: patawomeckindiantribeofvirginia.org

The Patawomeck Indian Tribe of Virginia is a state-recognized tribe in Virginia and a nonprofit organization of individuals who identify as descendants of the Patawomeck people. The majority of them live in and near Fredericksburg (Note: The former mayor of Fredricksburg was a member of the Patawomeck Indian Tribe of Virginia.) and Stafford County, Virginia.

The Patawomeck Indian Tribe of Virginia is not federally recognized as a Native American tribe. The organization has never petitioned for federal recognition via the Bureau of Indian Affairs; however, in 2023 a bill was introduced in the United States House of Representatives for the tribe to be federally recognized.

The Patawomeck people, more commonly known as the Potomac people, are a historic Eastern Algonquian–speaking tribe who lived on the Virginia.

== Recognition ==
=== State recognition ===
Seeking state recognition in the 1990s, the tribe received research assistance through a cooperative venture with the College of William and Mary's Department of Anthropology to help document their case. They were rejected by the Virginia Council on Indians, and were told that they met five of the six criteria. The council felt that the tribe were not able to prove that their group had continuously existed as a distinct Indian community. The tribe withdrew their application after being unable to supply more documentation.

Feeling they had sufficient evidence of continuous existence as a community, they persuaded Virginia house Speaker and Stafford representative Bill Howell to sponsor a recognition bill. Singer Wayne Newton, who identifies as Patawomeck, spoke before the House Rules Committee in support of recognition. Newton's cousin, who was the chief, faulted Walter Plecker for his tribe's inability to document its ancestry, referring to Virginia's Racial Integrity Act of 1924, where official records reclassified all nonwhites as "colored". The measure was passed unanimously by both houses and the tribe became state-recognized.

The same measure granted the Patawomecks a seat on the Virginia Council on Indians. The majority of tribes ended their membership in the council in response, and the Virginia Council on Indians was dissolved.

=== Discussion regarding federal recognition ===
The Stafford County Historical Society opposes federal recognition of the tribe, saying it could find no documentation connecting members of the state-recognized tribe to the historical Native Americans who lived along the Potomac River. Anthropologists Danielle Moretti-Langholtz and Buck Woodard, professors at the College of William and Mary who have worked with the tribe, say the tribe has documented history via oral histories and interviews, as well as reports from the Pamunkey. They also write that the Virginia Council of Indians did not exist to mandate criteria for recognition, and had not agreed on standards for recognition. They were former members of the Council themselves.

== Organizations ==
In 2014, the Patawomeck Indian Tribe of Virginia formed a 501(c)(3) nonprofit organization, based in Fredericksburg, Virginia.

Charles "Bootsy" Bullock serves as their president in 2024.

Robert Green of Fredericksburg, Virginia, identifies as "Chief Emeritus" of the Patawomeck Indians of Virginia and served as primary chief from 1996 to 2013. He also served as president of the Patawomeck Heritage Foundation from 2010 to 2015.

The related Patawomeck Heritage Foundation is a 501(c)(3) nonprofit organization, based in Colonial Beach, Virginia and incorporated in 2010. Its officers are:

- President: Lou Silver
- Treasurer: Mary Ann Berry, also agent
- Secretary: Annette Schaul.
- Executive assistant: Minne Lightner.

In 2022, they had an estimated membership of 2,300. By 2023, their membership was 2,600.

== History ==
Members of the Patawomeck Indian Tribe of Virginia.

Robert "Two Eagles" Green was the chief of the tribe from its reorganization until 2013, when he retired and became Chief Emeritus. Green was an adviser to the filmmakers of The New World (2005), about the colony at Jamestown and the Native American peoples and cultures encountered by the colonists. Green appeared in the film in a non-speaking role; his son Jason Green also appeared as a Powhatan warrior. However, racism in Virginia caused many families to hide their Indian ancestry. The Patawomecks provided the filmmakers with numerous wild turkey feathers and deer antlers to create authentic clothing for the Native American characters in the film. Green also portrayed Powhatan in the episode "Pocahontas Revealed" (2007) of PBS's Nova.

In 2013, Green was succeeded as chief by John Lightner. Today the tribe has approximately 2,300 members, most of whom live in Stafford County within ten miles of Patawomeck. In 2014, the tribe worked with Stafford High School to make the school's "Indian" mascot more representative of Virginia Indians. In 2019, John Lightner was succeeded by Charles Bullock as Chief.

== Activities ==
The organization opened the Patawomeck Museum and Cultural Center in Fredericksburg in 2023. Stafford County leased an 1890s brick farmhouse on 17-acres of land to the organization for $1 a year as part of a ten-year lease. The lease was terminated in 2025 due to a lack of documentation of the tribe's origins. Local businesses and foundations have provided grants to fund the restoration of the farmhouse.

== Status ==
In 2023, then-Representative Abigail Spanberger introduced a bill in the House of Representatives, co-sponsored by Representatives Jen Kiggans and Jennifer Wexton, for the Patawomeck Indian Tribe of Virginia to be federally recognized.

=== Discussion of legitimacy ===
The Stafford County Historical Society opposes federal recognition of the Patawomeck Indian Tribe of Virginia since it could find no documentation connecting members of the state-recognized tribe to the historical Native Americans who lived along the Potomac River. In 2023, the society's president, Connie Hilker, wrote: “After a two-and-a-half-year review of all available sources and scholarship, SCHS finds no evidence to support the PITV’s claim of tribal continuity … or that the current members of the organization are descendants of the original Patawomeck tribe." While the historical Patawomeck people lived in what is now Stafford County into the 17th-century, no historical records confirm that the tribe lived there much after their 1666 massacre.

The Patawomeck tribe's lawyer, Charlie Payne, disagrees with the historical society's findings. Anthropologists Danielle Moretti-Langholtz and Buck Woodard, professors at the College of William and Mary who have worked with the tribe, say the tribe has documented history via oral histories and interviews, as well as reports from the Pamunkey. They also write that the Virginia Council of Indians did not exist to mandate criteria for recognition, and had not agreed on standards for recognition. They were former members of the Council themselves.

The Stafford County Board of Supervisors voted unanimously to stop leasing land to the tribe in 2025, due to concerns about their legitimacy. The County Administrator stated the Board has attempted to obtain more records from the tribe, but were not given any. The Board stated that if documentation was provided, they would reconsider their decision.
