= Chickahominy people =

Ethnic group

Chickahominy
Total population
- (Enrolled members)

Regions with significant populations
- Charles City County, Virginia (Chickahominy): 840
- New Kent County, Virginia (Eastern Chickahominy): 132

Languages
- English, possibly an Algonquian language

Religion
- Christianity, Native American religions

Related ethnic groups
- Piscataway, Yaocomico, Pamunkey, Mattaponi

The Chickahominy are a federally recognized tribe of Virginian Native Americans who primarily live in Charles City County, located along the James River midway between Richmond and Williamsburg in the Commonwealth of Virginia. This area of the Tidewater is not far from where they were living in 1600, before the arrival of colonists from England. They were officially recognized by the state in 1983 and by the federal government in January 2018.

The Eastern Chickahominy split from the main tribe in 1983 and were recognized as a separate tribe by the state that year, and by the federal government in January 2018. They are based in New Kent County, about 25 miles (40 km) east of Richmond. Neither tribe has an Indian reservation, having been displaced from their land by colonial settlement in the 17th century, but they have purchased lands that they devote to communal purposes.

Both tribes are among the 11 who have organized and been officially recognized by Virginia since 1983. Federal status was granted to the Chickahominy and Eastern Chickahominy tribes through passage of the Thomasina E. Jordan Indian Tribes of Virginia Federal Recognition Act of 2017 on January 30, 2018.

== History ==
=== Early history ===
The Chickahominy ("The Coarse Ground Corn People") lived along the Chickahominy River and were among numerous independent nations who had long occupied the Tidewater area. During their early history, the Chickahominy made shell-tempered pottery, dispersed towns and maize agricultural fields. In 500 AD, the Chickahominy began burying their dead in collective ossuaries centuries before neighboring nations. In the middle of the river valley, the Chickahominy constructed sites for intertown gatherings and burial grounds in marshy areas. The lower portion of the river had fortified towns and facilities for feasting.

At contact, the Chickahominy were composed of 16 towns led by 8 Mungai ("great men") in council with elders (Cawcawwasoughs) and religious leaders. According to Woodard and Moretti-Langholtz, it is also possible the nation was composed of 8 clans and 2 moieties with a Mungai for each clan. The Chickahominy's original territory consisted of the land along the Chickahominy River (named by the English after them), from the mouth of the river at its confluence with the James River, near Jamestown in present-day Charles City County, to what is now New Kent County, Virginia. The Chickahominy maintained abundant stocks of fish and migratory birds. They also practiced Three Sisters agriculture with maize, beans and squash, with corn possibly making up 50% of the Chickahominy diet.

=== Powhatan period ===
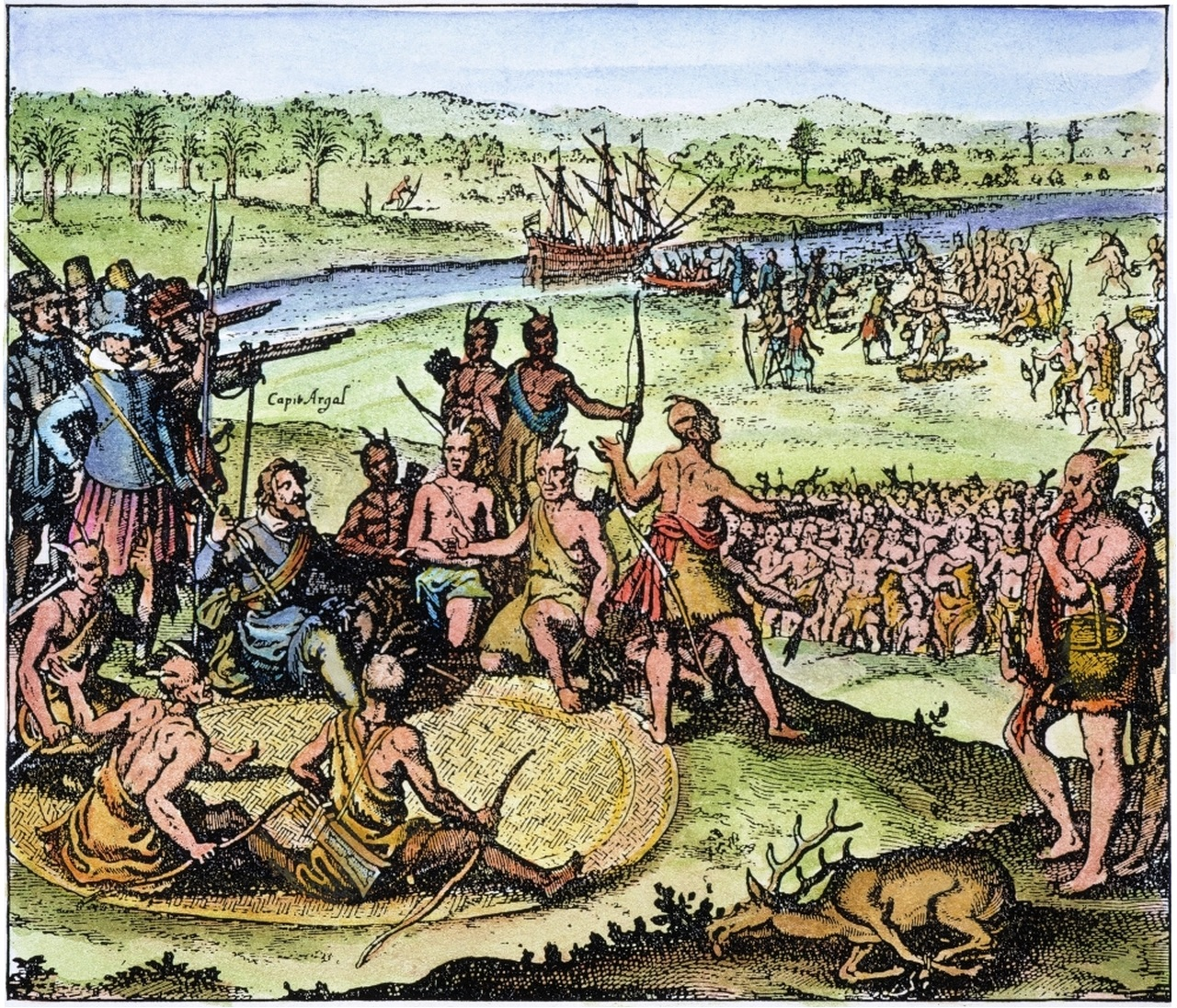
English depiction of the negotiation of the 1614 treaty

They were encountered by settlers from the first permanent English settlement founded at Jamestown in 1607. The nation helped the English survive during the first few winters by trading food for English goods, as the settlers were ill-prepared for farming and developing their colony. The Chickahominy taught the English how to grow and preserve crops in local conditions. By 1614, they had signed a treaty with the colonists; it required them to provide 300 warriors to fight the Spanish, which had an established colony in Florida and the lower East Coast.

While independent, the Chickahominy were at times allied with the Powhatan Confederacy. The Chickahominy may have been used by the Powhatan to quell rivalries and bring an end to infighting amongst the members of the Confederacy. In return, they enjoyed some benefits, such as trading with the confederacy. As part of the alliance between the Powhatan Confederacy and the Chickahominy, it appears they were to act as a buffer between the confederacy and other enemies in the event of an attack, thus giving Powhatan forces time to mobilize. Some 20th-century sources say the Chickahominy joined the Powhatan Confederacy in 1616. Others contend they did not become members of the confederacy until 1677, when Cockacoeske signed the Treaty of Middle Plantation. The treaty acknowledged her as leader (Mamanatowick) of the Chickahominy and several other tribes. Others argue they never joined the Powhatan Confederacy and were continuously independent.

=== Colonial period ===
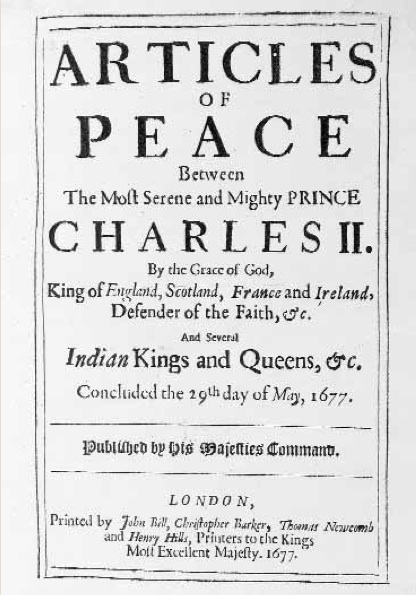
Treaty of Middle Plantation (1677)

Over time, the English began to expand their settlements and crowded out the Chickahominy from their homeland. The peoples had earlier come into conflict over uses of land, as the Chickahominy expected to travel freely for hunting, and the English wanted to preserve some property as private. Following the Anglo-Powhatan Wars of 1644–46, the nation was forced to cede most of its land for the peace treaty. The nation resettled on reservation land set aside by the treaty in the Pamunkey Neck area, alongside the Pamunkey, between the Mattaponi and Pamunkey Rivers.

They stayed there until 1661, when they moved again to the headwaters of the Mattaponi, but their reserved holdings continued to be illegally settled by the expanding English colony. In 1677, the Chickahominy were among the tribes signing a peace treaty with the King of England. The tribe lost title to the last part of their reservation lands in 1718, but continued to live in the area for some time.

=== Modern period ===
A Chickahominy couple in 1918, photographed by Frank Speck.

During the 19th century, Chickahominy people slowly moved back to the region of the Chickahominy River, their ancestral lands. In the 20th century, descendants of these people organized to form the current Eastern Chickahominy and Chickahominy tribes, respectively. The migrations happened before the end of the 18th century, and few records survive in this "burnt-over district," disrupted by major wars, by which to establish their dates of migration.

== Tribal governments ==
The Chickahominy tribe consists of about 840 people who live within a five-mile (8-km) radius of each other and the tribal center, in an area known as Chickahominy Ridge. Several hundred more live in other parts of the United States, including California, Florida, New York, Oklahoma, South Carolina, West Virginia and Pennsylvania. Current tribal lands of about 110 acres (0.45 km^{2}) are in the tribe's traditional territory, present-day Charles City County. The tribal center on the land is the location of an annual Powwow and Fall Festival.

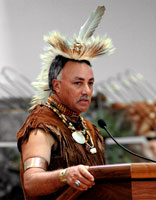
Wayne Adkins, a member of the Chickahominy Tribe, represents the tribe in the UK.

The Chickahominy are led by a tribal council of 12 men and women, including a chief and two assistant chiefs. These positions are elected by members of the tribe, by vote. The current chief is Stephen Adkins. He served as Director of Human Resources for the Commonwealth of Virginia in the administration of Governor Tim Kaine. Wayne Adkins is an assistant chief, along with Reggie Stewart.

Most members of the Chickahominy Tribe are Christian; many attend Samaria Baptist Church, formerly called Samaria Indian Church, in Charles City County. The church was built upon tribal grounds and once served as a school for the children of the tribe. The church is located directly across from the tribal headquarters.

=== Eastern Chickahominy ===
The people of the Chickahominy Tribe Eastern Division shared a history with the Chickahominy until the late 20th century, when they decided to organize their own tribal government. As their community was based in New Kent County, some found it inconvenient always to travel to Charles City County for tribal meetings. Others say the split happened because of disagreements over religious practice and land use. Family ties have kept the two tribes intertwined.

Today, the Eastern Chickahominy have about 132 members and own about 41 acres (17 ha) of land. Tribe members have served in the United States military since World War I. The tribe serves the needs of its community as a nontaxable organization. This is supported through contributions and from members who pay dues.

== Federal recognition ==
The Chickahominy were recognized on January 11, 2018. U.S. Senators Tim Kaine and Mark Warner secured passage of the Thomasina E. Jordan Indian Tribes of Virginia Federal Recognition Act of 2017.

Once signed by then President Donald J Trump, the legislation granted federal recognition of the following six Virginia tribes: the Chickahominy, the Eastern Chickahominy, the Upper Mattaponi, the Rappahannock, the Monacan, and the Nansemond. Since the 1990s, the tribes had been seeking federal recognition through an act of Congress.

The most recent unsuccessful effort was in March 2009, when Representative Jim Moran of Virginia sponsored a bill to grant federal recognition to these six Virginia Indian "landless" tribes. By June the bill had passed the House of Representatives. A day after it was voted on in the House, a companion bill was sent to the Senate. The Senate referred this bill to their Committee on Indian Affairs, which approved the bill on October 22, 2009. On December 23, 2009, the Senate added the bill to its legislative calendar. This was the farthest the bill had gotten in the congressional process to that date. This effort was supported by the Commonwealth of Virginia, and executives of the Baptist Church, among other groups.

The bill was opposed by Senator Tom Coburn (R-OK), who cited "jurisdictional concerns". The senator believed requests for tribal recognition should be processed through the Bureau of Indian Affairs (BIA). Moran and others supported the congressional process in part because the Virginia tribes lost their continuity of records due to discriminatory actions of the state government that destroyed their records of Indian identity, under the changes resulting from the Racial Integrity Act of 1924 and the orders of Walter Plecker, the state registrar for the Bureau of Vital Statistics at the time.

The Pamunkey and Mattaponi, also state-recognized, gained recognition in separate processes, through the BIA's administrative process. They believed their continuing residency on and control of their reservations demonstrated their historical continuity as tribes.

Working to improve its process, in 2013, the BIA announced proposed changes to regulations, which include allowing tribes to document a shorter timeframe to establish historical continuity. This has the potential of making it easier for tribes to establish recent historical continuity and gain recognition, as well as to speed up the Bureau's review of documentation.
