= Rappahannock people =

Federally recognized Native American tribe in Virginia

Rappahannock Tribe
- Seal
- Capital: Indian Neck, Virginia; 37°54′30″N 77°02′50″W
- Recognised national languages: English, Rappahannock, other Algonquian languages (historical)
- Ethnic groups: Rappahannock people

State-recognized tribe
  - Contact with European colonists: 1607
  - State Recognition: January 2018

Population
  - Estimate: 500

The Rappahannock Tribe are a federally recognized Native American tribe in Virginia and one of the eleven state-recognized tribes. They are made up of descendants of several small Algonquian-speaking tribes who merged in the late 17th century.

In January 2018, they were one of six Virginia tribes to gain federal recognition through the Thomasina E. Jordan Indian Tribes of Virginia Federal Recognition Act of 2017.

== History ==
=== 17th century ===
In 1607, the Rappahannock were the dominant tribe of the Rappahannock River valley, maintaining 13 villages along the north and south banks of the river named after them. Their capital town was Topahanocke (or Tappahannock). They were a peripheral group among the Algonquian-speaking tribes of the Powhatan Confederacy. In the spring of that year, when news spread of explorers sailing on the James River, their weroance took a party and rushed there. They stayed with their cousins, the Quiockohannock, and sent word requesting audience with the newcomers. The weroance and explorers met on May 4.

George Percy wrote a vivid description of the weroance, whose body was painted crimson, and face was painted blue sprinkled with silver. He wore a red deer-hair crown tied around his hair knot and a copper plate on the other side, with two feathers arranged like horns, and earrings made of bird-claws fastened with yellow metal. When the weroance came to the shore, he was playing a flute. He escorted the explorers to his camp following a tobacco ceremony.

The settlers were confused about the Native names. For some time they referred to the Quiockohannock, who lived south of the James, as the Tappahannock.

After Captain John Smith was captured in December 1607, he was taken northward to the Rappahannock capital. He was told that they wished to see if he was from the same nation that had attacked them some years earlier (possibly the Spanish); however, they determined that he was not. In 1608 Smith returned to the Rappahannock and mediated a feud between them and their neighbors, the Moraughticund.

The Rappahannock seldom appeared in English colonial records. Colonists attacked them in 1623 in retaliation after tribes attacked settlers in and near Jamestown in the Indian massacre of 1622. When the Second Anglo-Powhatan War of 1644–1645 broke out, the colonists seem to have viewed the Rappahannock as independent and outside the conflict, and did not attack the people.

In the 1650s, when colonists began settling along the river, the Rappahannock withdrew from the southern bank; their weroance Accopatough deeded the land east of Totuskey Creek to settlers just before he died in April 1651. His successor Taweeren confirmed the deed in May. Their main town in 1652 was 2 mi (3.2 km) up Cat Point Creek. By 1653, English settlers were moving into the region in such numbers, that the colony assigned the tribe reserved land. They also committed to build Taweeren an English-style house.

Disputes between the two groups continued. In November 1654, a group of colonists visited the tribe to demand restitution for damages, but a brawl ensued in which Taweeren was killed. Border disputes continued under his successor Wachicopa. In 1662, the Virginia Colony fixed the Rappahannock boundaries at Cat Point Creek on the west and Totuskey Creek on the east. The Rappahannock gave up trying to defend their homeland and moved away; by 1669 they were settled at the headwaters of the Mattaponi River with 30 bowmen (and likely about 100 people in total).

In 1677, the Rappahannock joined the briefly resurrected Powhatan Confederacy of Cockacoeske, but broke away again in 1678. In 1684, the tribe numbered only 70 total, located on the ridge between the Mattaponi and Rappahannock rivers. The Virginia Colony ordered them to merge with the Portobago Indians on the Upper Rappahannock in Essex County, Virginia, supposedly for protection from the marauding Seneca soldiers. The Seneca had invaded the area from their base in western, present-day New York as part of the Beaver Wars.

=== 20th and 21st centuries ===
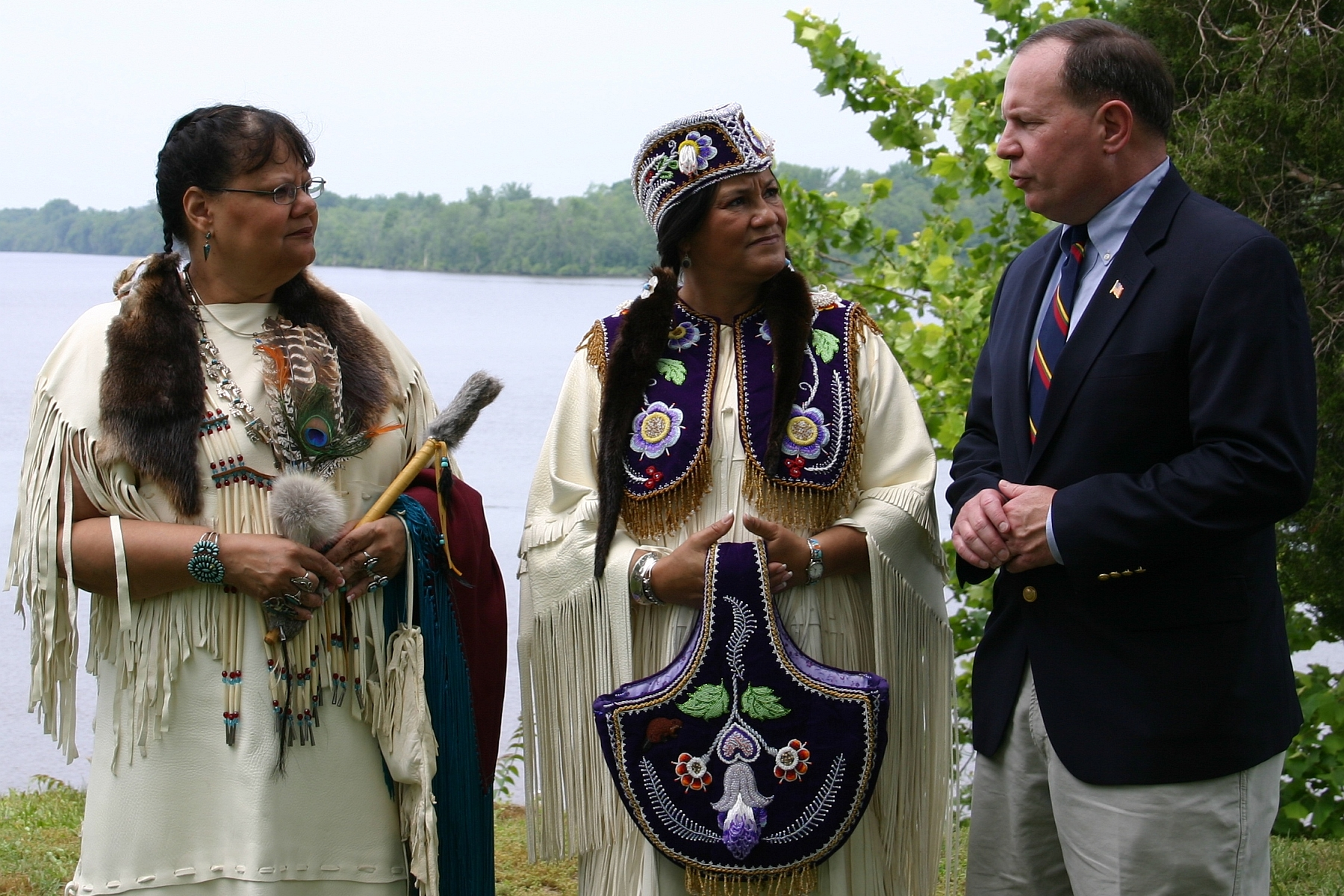
Tribal members Wanda Fortune and G. Anne Richardson (left and center), 2009

The Rappahannock Tribe consists of a few hundred descendants of the allied Algonquian Rappahannock, Morattico (Moraughtacund), Portobacco, and Doeg tribes, who merged in the late 17th century. Most live in Essex, Caroline, and King and Queen counties.

To solidify their tribal government to seek state recognition, the Rappahannock incorporated in 1921; their first chief was George Nelson. The Commonwealth of Virginia officially recognized the tribe in January 1983. In 1998, they elected Chief G. Anne Richardson, the first woman chief to lead a Native American tribe in Virginia since the 18th century.

The tribe did not have a reservation and during the centuries had intermarried with other ethnicities in the region. But they had a community and identified as Rappahannock or Indian. By the Racial Integrity Act of 1924, Virginia enforced a binary system of a one-drop rule, classifying all persons as "white" or "colored", and even requiring changes to vital records to reflect this. Most of the Rappahannock and other Native Americans lost their records as "Indian" after this law was implemented. This made it difficult for the Rappahannock to demonstrate tribal continuity as required for federal recognition. For more than two decades, persons who were of mixed race had been classified as black in records, despite identifying culturally as Rappahannock. Rappahannock men, Robert Percell Byrd, Oliver W. Fortune and Edward Arnell Nelson were drafted as “colored,” they refused to serve and were convicted and jailed. Upon release and classification as conscientious objectors, they served in the military as medics.

But on January 12, 2018, federal recognition was granted to the Rappahannock Tribe through the passage of the Thomasina E. Jordan Indian Tribes of Virginia Federal Recognition Act of 2017, in addition to five other landless Virginia tribes who had suffered from similar documentation and discrimination issues.

In 2022, the Rappahannock Tribe reacquired Fones Cliff, 465 acres of land along the Rappahannock River, considered by the tribe as sacred. In 2025, the Rappahannock Tribe announced it acquired the largest amount of its ancestral lands to date with the transfer of nearly 1,000 acres from The Conservation Fund, to be preserved in perpetuity under easement with the United States Fish and Wildlife Service and the Virginia Board of Historic Resources. In 2026, the Rappahannock Tribe reclaimed an additional 704 acres at Fones Cliff, bringings its total land acquisitions around Fones Cliff between 2017 and 2026 to 2,391 acres, with most of its acreage under conservation easements.

== Ethnobotany ==
The Rappahannock use Pseudognaphalium obtusifolium for a variety of uses. They take an infusion of the roots for chills, smoke an infusion of dried leaves or dried stems in a pipe for asthma, and chew the leaves recreationally.

== Notable Rappahannock ==
- Chief Anne Richardson
- Mildred Jeter Loving
