= Thomasina Jordan =

American activist

Thomasina Elizabeth Jordan
- Born: Eve Claire Schwartz; September 25, 1929; Boston, Massachusetts, United States
- Died: May 23, 1999
- Other name: Red Hawk Woman
- Occupation: Activist
- Spouse: D. Wendell Jordan

Thomasina Elizabeth Jordan (Red Hawk Woman) (born Eve Claire Schwartz, 1929-1999) was an activist and advocate for American Indian tribes, particularly tribes in the US state of Virginia, who served in the United States Electoral College in 1988 and the 1990s. Jordan self-identified as Mashpee Wampanoag, Penobscot, and Assateague. She was made an honorary member of the Nansemond and Chickahominy tribes.

In 2020, it was reported that all four of Jordan's grandparents were born in Russia and that she was not a Native American woman as previously claimed.

== Early life and education ==
Jordan was born in Boston, Massachusetts on September 25, 1929 to Samuel E. Schwartz, a Russian immigrant and local businessman, and Harriette Libby, the daughter of Russian immigrants. Jordan was raised in a Jewish family. The family resided in an Ashkenazi Jewish neighborhood in Revere, Massachusetts.

Jordan received bachelor's and master's degrees in fine arts at Bishop Lee College in Boston. She studied at Harvard University, received a special educational doctorate from The Catholic University of America, and attended the American Academy of Dramatic Arts for eighteen months in New York City.

== Career ==
Jordan moved to Alexandria, Virginia, where she was a member of the Alexandria Republican Democratic City Committee. In the Electoral College, Jordan served as a Republican elector in the Alexandria district. She worked as a special education advisor for the Bureau of Indian Affairs.

Jordan was appointed Chairperson of the Virginia Council on Indians by Governors George Allen and Jim Gilmore.

She also founded the American Indian Cultural Exchange, served on the Board of Directors of Save the Children and the National Rehabilitation Hospital, was president of Chapter I of the Capital Speakers Club, and was a recipient of the Medal of Honor of the National Society of the Daughters of the American Revolution.

According to a resolution passed by the Virginia General Assembly honoring her life, "Thomasina Jordan was instrumental throughout the years in bringing Indian issues to the forefront in the General Assembly, including legislation to correct birth certificates to identify Native Americans as such, allow animal parts and feathers to be used in religious regalia, and memorialize the United States Congress to grant historic federal recognition to Virginia’s state-recognized tribes."

Congress first considered a recognition bill, as championed by Jordan and others, in 2000. Six Virginia tribes eventually gained federal recognition in 2018 under an act bearing her name, the Thomasina E. Jordan Indian Tribes of Virginia Federal Recognition Act of 2017.

== Claims of Indigenous identity ==
Social Security Administration records show that Jordan had amended her name, her birthdate, her birthplace, her parentage and her ethnicity at least five different times during the course of her life. Jordan was of Russian Jewish parentage and did not possess any Native American heritage.

In 1977, Jordan was described in a widely circulated newspaper article as Penobscot. This is the first documented reference of Jordan in media as a Native American person. By 1988, Jordan appeared in a newspaper as "Mashbee/Wampanoag [sic]". Her friend, Felipe Rose of The Village People, referred to her as Assateague in a Massachusetts newspaper after her death.

Jordan stated to a reporter that she was born in the Cape Cod region of Massachusetts, orphaned at a young age, and was raised by her grandparents, "Elton Sanford and Hattie Sanford", in the towns of Mashpee and Sandwich. The newspaper article incorrectly reported the names of her parents as "Stephen Edward Stanford St. Clair" and "Arianne Mary Elizabeth Sanborn". Jordan used the St. Clair and Sanborn names in a March 1988 Social Security Administration amendment in which she also fraudulently reported her birthplace as Machias, Maine, despite her parents being named Samuel E. Schwartz and Harriette Libby and her confirmed birthplace being Boston, Massachusetts. In the same amendment, she checked off the "North American Indian or Alaska Native" category in a voluntary "Race/Ethnic Description" section of the paperwork.

In 1999, her birth year, 1929, was not published in her obituary at the request of her husband.
