= Tackonekintaco =

16th and 17th-century leader of the Warraskoyack tribe

Tackonekintaco (birth year unknown – c. 1620s) was a 16th and 17th-century leader of the Warraskoyack tribe of the Powhatan Confederacy, in what is now the U.S. state of Virginia.

== Life and rule ==
Tackonekintaco was a respected leader within the Warraskoyack tribe. By the late 1590s, Tackonekintaco had become the new weroance of the tribe. The main village of the tribe was located in present-day Smithfield, Virginia. The tribe had at least 40 warriors and over 135 tribal members.

In December 1608, Tackonekintaco was visited by captain John Smith, with whom he had established friendly relations and gave corn to on an earlier trip. He cautioned Smith against continuing his journey in search of lost colonists, primarily due to the threat of violence from Powhatan. John Smith wrote that Tackonekintaco provided him with "good counsel" and he told the chief that he had his "perpetual love" and friendship. Upon Smith's departure, he left his page Samuel Collier with Tackonekintaco to learn the Algonquian language, and Tackonekintaco provided some local villagers as guides to accompany Michael Sicklemore on his journey south into the Chowanoc country. Tackonekintaco befriended Collier who lived with the tribe during that period.

As weroance, Tackonekintaco controlled the tribe's surplus stock of corn which was of great interest to colonists.

=== Capture by Virginia Company ===
After Smith's departure from Virginia, Tackonekintaco's time in leadership was met with threats of coercion and violence by colonists. In the summer of 1610, Tackonekintaco and his son, Tangoit were captured by colonists led by Christopher Newport, and held as hostages. To receive his freedom and his son's, he was forced to contract with the Virginia Company to exchange 500 bushels of wheats, beans, and peas for an indefinite quantity of copper, beads, and hatchets from the tribe. When Tackonekintaco refused to deliver the provisions, Governor of Virginia Baron De La Warr ordered his troops to attack their tribe and burn their main village. Tackonekintaco spotted the troops coming downriver, and gave the signal for his people to flee the village and take refuge in surrounding forests.

In 1623 in the aftermath of the Indian massacre of 1622, the tribe was attacked and later, an English fort was built within its borders.

== Death ==
Records indicate that Tackonekintaco died c. 1620s and was the last recorded weroance of the tribe.
