= Henry Spelman of Jamestown =

Young English adventurer, soldier, and author in Virginia

Captain Henry Spelman
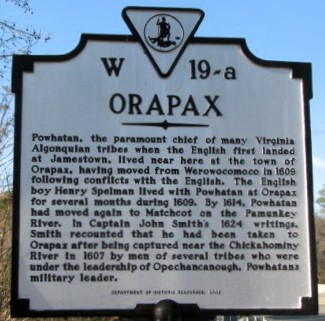
- Historical marker for the village of Orapax
- Born: 1595
- Died: 1623 (aged 27–28); Near the Anacostia River, Virginia Colony
- Other names: Henry Spilman, Spellman
- Occupations: Adventurer, Powhatan interpreter, soldier
- Notable work: "Relation of Virginia" (1613)

Henry Spelman (1595–1623) was an English adventurer, soldier, and author, the son of Erasmus Spelman and nephew to Sir Henry Spelman of Congham (1562–1641). The younger Henry Spelman was born in 1595 and left his home in Norfolk, England at age 14 to sail to Virginia Colony aboard the ship Unity, as a part of the Third Supply to the Jamestown Colony in 1609. He is remembered for being an early interpreter for the people of Jamestown as well as writing the Relation of Virginia, documenting the first permanent English colonial settlement in North America at Jamestown, Virginia, and particularly the lifestyles of the Native Americans of the Powhatan Confederacy led by Chief Powhatan.

== The 1609 Voyage ==
Spelman left England for the colonies in 1609 writing that he was not in good favor with his friends and desired to see other countries. Despite being a son of the high sheriff of his county, Spelman, owing to the traditional English practice of primogeniture, was left to indenture himself as a laborer to pay his passage to the New World. The Third Supply flotilla of nine ships carrying between 500 and 600 passengers set sail from Plymouth, England on June 2, 1609. Spelman was aboard the Unitie [sic]. In July 1609, the ships ran into a tropical storm and the fleet was broken up. The flagship Sea Venture carried the majority of the flotilla's supplies and wrecked upon the islands of Bermuda. After the storm passed, the remaining ships reassembled near Cape Henry and sailed up the coast, arriving at Jamestown 4 or 5 days later in October, 1609.

== A Son of Powhatan ==
Coat of Arms of Henry Spelman

Only two weeks after his arrival at the Jamestown Settlement, Spelman went with Captain John Smith on an expedition up the James River to the Indian town called Powhatan (located in the East End portion of the modern-day city of Richmond, Virginia). With Jamestown already nearly out of food provisions Smith knew that Jamestown would be unable to support the arrival of several hundred new colonists through the coming winter, and he traded young Henry Spelman's bonded servitude in exchange for the village, which was ruled by weroance Parahunt, son of Wahunsunacock (also known as Chief Powhatan). The agreement was also for the boy to apprentice the native Powhatan language, and thus become an interpreter and serve as a messenger between the two cultures. Young Henry Spelman was not the first boy to be traded to the Powhatans; Thomas Savage had previously been given to Powhatan by Captain Christopher Newport in 1608, and Spelman named in his writings of "Dutchman Samuel" (a Samuel Collier who was John Smith's page) as another European child that lived with the Natives.

Parahunt treated Spelman well, but relations soured between the colonists and the Powhatan, eventually leading to warfare. Spelman wanted to return to his fellow colonists and soon made his way back to Jamestown. His stay was brief however due to the shortage of food at the fort as they started into what has been named the starving time; and he knew the Indians had food in their village. Thomas Savage was ordered to return to the Powhatan yet he did not want to return alone therefore, Spelman elected himself to return with Savage as he knew the Powhatan had food stating that "which I the more willinglie did, by Reason that vitals were scarse with us". Spelman took a hatchet and some copper with him to give to the Powhatan. Powhatan was pleased and treated Spelman kindly for a while.

Spelman spent a total of about a year and a half with the Powhatan Indians, learning the Algonquian language and their way of life. He acted as a messenger and interpreter between the Powhatan people and English colonists, arranging for the two groups to trade with one another. Spelman was sent to Jamestown on behalf of the Powhatan to broker a trade for corn, yet after agreeing to the trade the party sent from Jamestown to trade ran into complications with the Powhatan and violence broke out. Of the 50 men in the Jamestown party, all but 16 were captured and killed. The party was led by the governor at the time John Ratcliffe who was also captured and tortured to death by the Powhatan women. This left Spelman and his fellow interpreter fearful to stay with the Powhatan and unable to return to Jamestown as they might have been hanged as traitors. By this time Spelman had been living at Yawtanoone (Youghtanund) for six months when a local chief of the Patawomeck, a tribe living on the south side of the Potomac River, came to visit Powhatan. Without telling Chief Powhatan, Spelman, Savage, and Dutchman Samuel left when the visiting Chief left. Powhatan's men captured and killed Samuel. Being afraid for his own safety, Spelman did not return and made his way to the Patawomeck. Spelman lived with the Patawomeck in a town called Pasptanzie (Passapatanzy) for over a year. During this time Spelman served as a baby-sitter for the chief's children. In January 1611 to the surprise of Captain Samuel Argall, who was sent to open trade with the Patawomek, he found Spelman living among the natives. Spelman was able to help Argall facilitate much-needed trade for the starving Jamestown. Spelman later had his freedom purchased by Captain Argall and returned to England. In his book "Generall Historie of Virginia, …", Capt. John Smith wrote that "Pokahontas the Kings daughter saved a boy called Henry Spilman that lived many yeeres after, by her meanes, amongst the Patawomekes." This was never mentioned by Spelman in his manuscript, and has been argued as the origin of Smith's story of being saved by Pocahontas. Spelman stayed at Paspatanzie, moved freely and was treated as a special guest.

== The Abduction of Pocahontas ==
In September 1610, Captain Samuel Argall was on a trading mission and found Spelman living with the Patawomeck, and he was bought back for "sum copper." With his knowledge of the native language and culture, Spelman continued to help the colonists trade copper for valuable supplies such as corn. He also helped the Colonists form an alliance with these northern Native Americans that would be important for the future of Jamestown. In 1613, Spelman was the interpreter when Chief Japazaws helped Argall abduct Pocahontas, which eventually led to her marriage to John Rolfe and a temporary peace with Powhatan. Despite Spelman's continued work as an interpreter for English colonists, mixing with both colonial and Powhatan leaders, Spelman never wrote about having any involvement in the abduction.

== Captain of Militia ==
Spelman went back to England in 1613, and made several other trips, but returned to Virginia each time to continue to serve as an interpreter, and eventually rising to the rank of captain. During this time he married a Patawomeck Indian woman who is believed to have been given the English name "Martha Fox." (According to traditions passed on to Henry Spellman's descendants, - his native wife was a sister of Pocahontas and daughter of Powhatan.) In 1619 Robert Poole, a rival interpreter, accused Spelman of speaking badly about the now Governor Samuel Argall to Opchanacanough, who was the new chief of the Powhatan people. The records state that "Poole chardgeth him he spake very unreverently and maliciously against this present Govern^{r}, wherby the honour and dignity of his place and person, and so of the whole Colonie, might be brought into contempte, by w^{ch} meanes what mischiefs might ensue from the Indians by disturbance of the peace or otherwise, may easily be conjectured." Spelman admitted to some of the charges but denied its malicious intent. If Spelman was found guilty of treason, Henry could have been executed, but he was instead found guilty of a lesser crime, and on 4 August 1619, he lost his rank of captain and was sentenced to serve the governor for seven years as an interpreter. Records state: "this sentence being read to Spelman he, as one that had in him more of the Savage than of the Christian, muttered certain words to himself neither showing any remorse for his offences, nor yet any thankfulness to the Assembly for their so favorable censure." This event in Spelman's life showcases the disfavor that intermediaries often received for associating with the natives.

== The War of Opchanacanough ==
In 1622 Opechancanough tried to expel all English colonists from Virginia by attacking the settlers, killing about 330 men, women, and children. Spelman was aboard the Elizabeth trading with the natives in the Pamunkey and therefore survived the attacks. Upon his return he was called upon to renew the English colonial alliance with the Patawomeck tribe, who were at that point detached from Powhatan's Confederacy. In the spring of 1623, Spelman volunteered to take a group of 19 men north to the Potomac River, away from the fighting near Jamestown, to barter for corn or other food. On 23 March 1623, the party was attacked by 60 canoes full of Anacostan Indians from their settlement of Nacochtank along the Anacostia River. Henry Spelman and all others in his party were killed or captured in the botched trading expedition (apart from Captain Henry Fleete, who spent 5 years in captivity with them and also learned their language). After providing much good service as an interpreter, Henry Spelman died as he had lived – amongst the Native Indians at 28 years old. Some sources say Spelman was captured and beheaded by the Anacostans. This attack was in reprisal for a 1622 attack by Fleete and the Patawomecks in which 18 Anacostans had been killed.

Captain John Smith wrote on Spelman's death, stating that "Captain Henrie Spilman Gentleman, that hath lived with in those Countries thirteene or fourteene yeares. One of the best interpreters in the Land, being furnished with a Barke and six and twentie men, hee was sent to trucke in the River of Patawomek, where he had lived a long time amongst the Salvages. Whether hee presumed too much upon his acquaintance amongst them, or they sought to be revenged of any for the slaughter made amongst them by the English so lately."

== Relation of Virginia ==
Henry Spelman's handwritten manuscript, a Relation of Virginia was written approximately in 1613 though it was "not deemed advisable to publish" yet was later printed privately in 1872 by the Chiswick Press of London. The manuscript chronicles Spelman's time with the Powhatan as well as details cultural aspects of Powhatan life. A brief overview of the cultural topics discussed by Spelman are:

Of their service to their gods: Spelman started by describing the Powhattan religion. In describing the religion of the natives, he wrote "yow must understand that for ye most part they worship ye divell." He also made comparisons to Christianity stating that "they observe no day to worshipe ther god: but uppon necessitye," Spelman and that "they offer Beades and Copper if at any time they want Rayne or have to much". He also alluded to the natives practicing child sacrifice.

Of the country of Virginia: Spelman briefly described the flora and fauna of the region.

Of their Townes & buildings: In describing the towns of the Powhattan wrote that "greatest toune have not above 20 or 30 houses in it". He also described their houses writing that "Ther Biuldinge are made like an oven with a litell hole to cum in at But more spatius with in havinge a hole in the midest of ye house for smoke to goe out at."

Their manner of marrying: In his section describing the customs surrounding marriage he wrote that, "The custum of ye cuntry is to have many wives and to buye them" and that "If any of ye Kings wives have onc[e] a child by him, he [never lieth with hir more] keepes hir no longer but puts hir from him givinge hir suffitient Copper and beads to mayntayne hir and the child while it is younge."

How they name their children: In this section Spelman wrote on the naming process of children writing that "the father, takes the child in his armes: and declares that his name shall be, as he then calls him, so his name is."

Their manner of visiting the sick with ye fashion of their burial if they die: Spelman briefly described medical practices, the role of Priests, and the use of items such as rattles and roots in medicine. Furthermore, he describes burial practices.

The justice and government: In relation to Powhatan law Spelman wrote that he "thought that Infidels wear lawless yet when I saw sum put to death." He wrote that murderers and thieves were punished.

The manor of execution: When it came to execution Spelman wrote "Then thos for murther wear Beaten with staves till ther bonns weare broken and beinge alive weare flounge into the fier, the other for robbinge was knockt on ye heade and beinge deade his bodye was burnt."

The manor of setting their corn with ye gathering and dressing: Spelman then wrote on the way the Powhatan plant and gather corn writing that they planted beans along with corn and that the process for the most part was women's work.

The setting at meat: In this section he briefly describes native dining customs.

The differences among them: Spelman wrote that the king is not distinguishable from others, and that priests shaves sides of heads.

The Armor and weapon with discipline in war: In warfare he described the Powhatan as having no armor or discipline but make good use of bows and arrows and tomahawks. He also wrote that "They never fight in open fields but always ether amonge reede or behind trees takinge ther oportunitie to shoot at ther enimies"

The Pastimes: Lastly, Spelman wrote on what natives did in their spare time writing that "they use sprorts much like to our heare in England"
