= Rye Harbor State Park =

State park in Rockingham County, New Hampshire

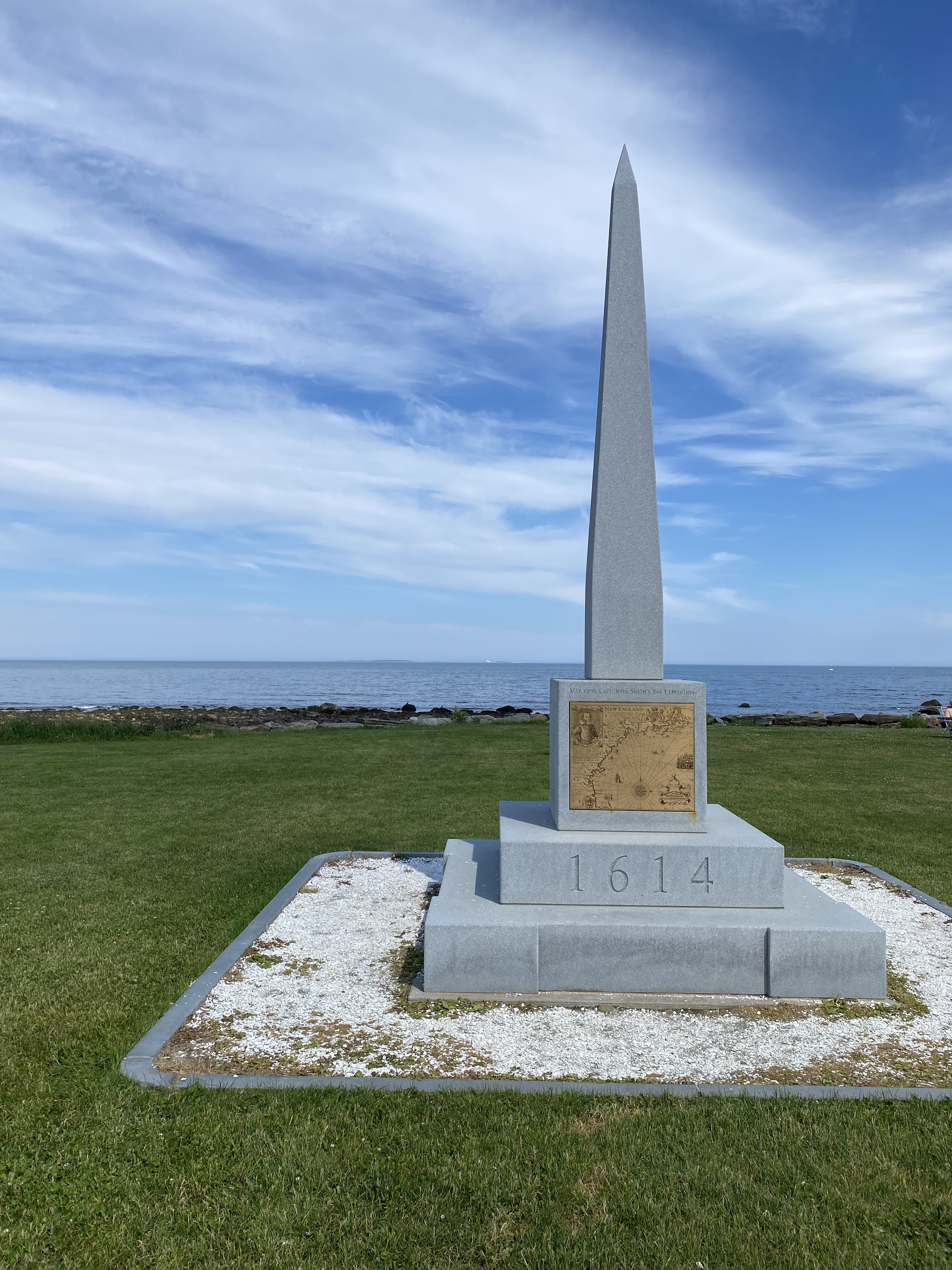
- 1614 Monument dedicated to explorer John Smith

- Location within New Hampshire
- Interactive map of Rye Harbor State Park
- Location: Rye, New Hampshire, United States
- Coordinates: 43°00′06″N 70°44′41″W
- Area: 63 acres (25 ha)
- Elevation: 7 feet (2.1 m)
- Established: 1936
- Administrator: New Hampshire Division of Parks and Recreation
- Website: Official website
- New Hampshire State Parks

Rye Harbor State Park is a public recreation area located on the Atlantic Ocean in the town of Rye, New Hampshire. The portion of the state park located on the peninsula known as Ragged Neck offers scenic views of the ocean, the Isles of Shoals, and the town harbor. Activities include saltwater fishing and picnicking. Amenities include benches, picnic tables, pavilion, and restrooms.

The park includes the 1614 Monument, an obelisk dedicated in 2014 to Captain John Smith, who explored the coast of New England in 1614. Also in the park is New Hampshire Historical Marker No. 18, which provides information about the Isles of Shoals.
