= Tucke Monument =

Historical monument in the U.S. state of New Hampshire

Coordinates: 42°58′32.20″N 70°36′48.74″W

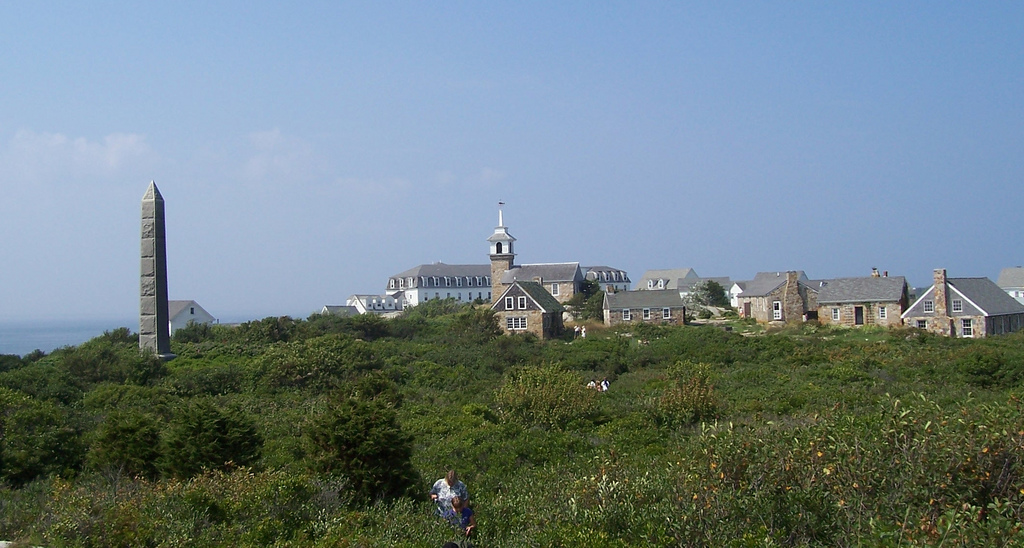
Tucke Monument (at left) in 2004

The Tucke Monument is a 46.5-foot-tall (14.2 m) obelisk gravestone monument erected in 1914 to honor Reverend John Tucke (1702–1773). The monument is located on Star Island, New Hampshire, where Tucke was a minister, judge, educator, physician, and in his probate record, "owner" of a 12-year-old black girl by the name of Diana, valued at 20 pounds.

The Tucke Monument is the tallest gravestone in the state of New Hampshire, far surpassing the 28-foot-tall (8.5 m) gravestone of Frank Jones located in Portsmouth.

== History ==
Philanthropist Edward Tuck, the namesake of Dartmouth's business school, financed the monument's construction in 1914, in cooperation with the New Hampshire Historical Society. On July 29, 1914, the Historical Society organized a dedication for the monument, and published a 68-page book, memorializing the event:

It was a beautiful day, and a fresh breeze blew all the clouds inland. The steamer Nassau from Boston, specially chartered for the occasion, left Jones's wharf at ten o'clock, making the trip in an hour. Arriving at Star Island the company proceeded to the monument, which stands a short distance southeast of the quaint little stone church where candle-light services are still held as in days of yore. Everyone was impressed by the dignity and beauty of the obelisk, which stands forty-six and one-half feet high, and can be seen from ten miles out at sea. The shaft tapers in the same proportions as the monument at Bunker Hill.

An inscription at the base of the Tucke Monument reads:

Underneath
are the Remains of the
REV. JOHN TUCKE, A. M.
He graduated at Harvard
College A. D. 1723, was ordained
here July 26, 1732,
and died late in august, 1773,
Aet. 71.
---
He was affable and polite in his
Manner, amiable in his disposition,
of great Piety and Integrity,
given to hospitality,
Diligent and faithful in his
pastoral office, well learned
in History and Geography as
well as general science, and a
careful Physician both to the
Bodies and the Souls
of his People.
---
Erected 1800 in memory of the Just.
---
The inscription above is taken from
the sandstone slab placed over the
grave of the Rev. John Tucke
by Dudley A. Tyng of Newburyport, Mass.
---
In 1914 a kinsman,
EDWARD TUCK,
renewed in permanent form
this memorial

.

== See also ==
- Monument for Captain John Smith
