= Henry Fleete =

Early Virginia merchant, interpreter, and politician

Lieutenant Colonel Henry Fleete
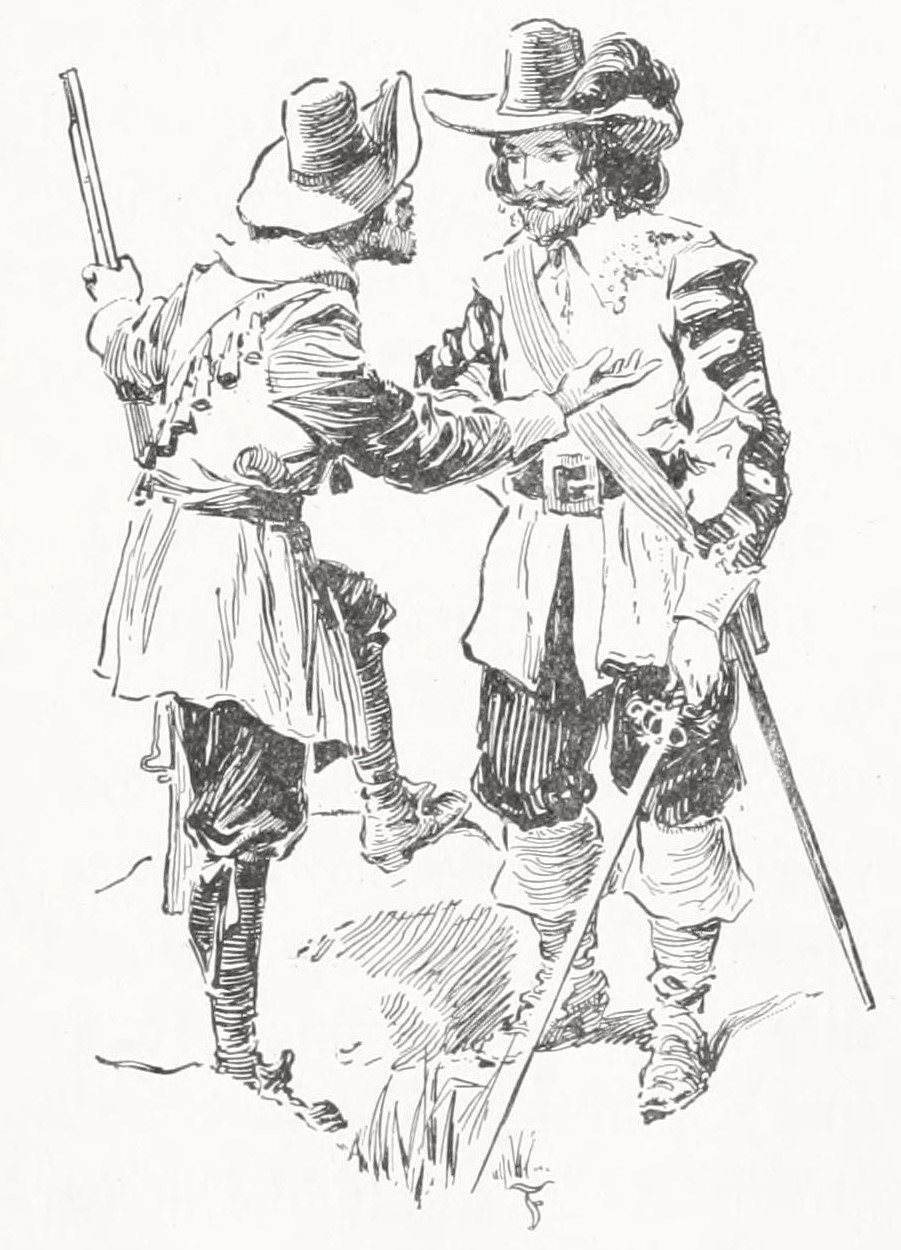
- Depiction of Captain Richard Lowe (left) speaking with Henry Fleete (right) in Virginia, circa 1635
- Born: c. 1602; Kent, Kingdom of England
- Died: 1661 (aged 58–59); Fleet's Island, Lancaster County, Colony of Virginia
- Other names: Fleet, Fleets
- Occupations: Trader, interpreter, politician
- Notable work: A Brief Journal of a Voyage Made in the Bark Warwick to Virginia and Other Parts of the Continent of America (1631)
- Spouse: Sarah Stone
- Children: Henry Fleet II

Henry Fleete (or Fleet) was an early English trader in the Colony of Virginia and Province of Maryland. He was a Burgess representative for the Virginia Colony, and interacted with William Claiborne during the time of conflict between Protestant Virginians and Catholic Maryland leadership. During a trading expedition with Henry Spelman of Jamestown, he was abducted and held captive by the Anacostan people for almost five years.

== Family and early life ==
Fleete was the son of William Fleete of Chartham, Kent, and Debora Scott Fleete. He was a great-grandson of Thomas Wyatt the Younger. Henry had brothers named Edward, John, and Reynold. His father, William Fleete, was of the Virginia Company of London.

== In Virginia colony ==
Henry Fleete emigrated to Jamestown, Virginia in 1621 with incoming John Harvey (Virginia governor).

During a trading expedition with Henry Spelman of Jamestown, Fleete was abducted and held captive by the Anacostan people for almost five years. He was 24-25 years old at the time of his capture. Henry was ransomed to the government of Virginia in c. 1626.

Fleete returned to England to tell others of his abduction, and persuaded William Cloberry and his organization associates to finance fur trade with natives in Virginia, specifically North American beaver fur. Fleet was master of the bark Paramour for Cloberry & Company.

Fleete settled at "St. George's Hundred" on land granted to him near the St. Georges Creek. Fleete's house, West St. Mary's Manor was built around 1627 and used for meetings.

In September, 1631, the Warwick sailed from England to Virginia with Fleete acting as factor and Captain John Dunton as the shipmaster. Fleete traded around the Potomac River, but was arrested for tax evasion by rival traders Charles Harman and John Utie. Henry Fleete was put on trial for tax evasion, but let free.

== Maryland affairs ==
In 1634, "Captain Henry Fleete, gentleman" sailed with Leonard Calvert's colonists to act as a guide for the natives in Virginia and Maryland. While most of the settlers were Roman Catholic, Fleete was listed as a Protestant. With Governor L. Calvert, Fleete negotiated with the Piscataway people and Yaocomico to settle the colony in St. Mary's City, Maryland in exchange for armed protection for the natives' enemies.

In April, 1635, Fleete became involved with William Claiborne when he and Captain William Humber seized the pinnace Longtail (commanded by a Thomas Smith) practicing without a license. Claiborne's business partners, Cloberry & Company, had become unsatisfied with the fur shipment amounts, and considered Claiborne's right to Kent Island invalid. This led to a few more skirmishes and eventually, a time of riot in Maryland.

In 1635, "Fleete's Hill" trading post was established near Petersburg, Virginia. Fleet Street in Petersburg is named after him. In February 1638 [O.S. February 1637], Fleete was sailing cargo for Maryland in the ship Deborah.

Henry Fleete is also credited for capturing infamous Opechancanough with Virginian forces in 1646.

Fleete died in Lancaster County on a plantation property. Fleete's namesake island and Fleets Bay [sic] both like north of the mouth of the Rappahannock River. His descendants go by the surname "Fleet".

== Notes ==
=== Further reading ===
- Fleet, Betsy. Henry Fleete: Pioneer, Explorer, Trader, Planter, Legislator, Justice & Peacemaker. United States, Whittet & Shepperson, Printers, 1989.
- Fleet, Henry. A Brief Journal of a Voyage Made in the Bark Warwick to Virginia and Other Parts of the Continent of America. 1631.
