= Samuel Collier =

Early English colonist and interpreter in Virginia

- Born: c. 1595; London, Kingdom of England
- Died: 1622 (aged 26–27); Jamestown, Virginia Colony
- Cause of death: Friendly fire during Powhatan uprising
- Other name: Dutch Samuel
- Known for: Page to John Smith, interpreter in Early America, Jamestown colonist

Samuel Collier (b. c. 1595 - d. 1622) was an English boy who arrived in Jamestown, Virginia, in 1607 aboard the Susan Constant, one of the three founding ships. He served as the page to captain John Smith, and later as an Algonquian interpreter for the colony.

== Early life ==
Collier was born around 1595 in London, England.

=== Jamestown colonist ===
Collier is listed among the 104 colonists on the Virginia Company of London's manifest, and was one of four boys in the first group of settlers to Jamestown. He served as a servant and page to captain John Smith and accompanied Smith on his explorations into the unknown parts of Virginia. Collier was likely around 11-12 years old in 1607 which was a normal age for apprenticeships in England. Collier accompanied Smith for his first meeting with Powhatan and Pocahontas.

According to contemporary historians, Collier was sent by Smith to learn the language of the Algonquian-speaking Warraskoyack tribe of the Powhatan Confederacy, and later served the colony as an interpreter. He befriended weroance (chief) Tackonekintaco during that period. Collier was held in high esteem by Smith as a respected member of the community.

== Death ==
According to Smith's accounts, Collier died in 1622 aged 26-27 due to accidental friendly fire of an English sentinel during the Powhatan uprising.

== Legacy ==
Collier's story has been fictionalized in several children's books and in young adult literature. The 2001 book Surviving Jamestown: The Adventures Of Young Sam Collier by Gail Langer Karwoski provides a fictional account of Collier's journey to the New World and his life in Jamestown.

Collier is a character in the 2000 book titled 1609: Winter of the Dead by Elizabeth Massie.

In 2007, a children's historical semi-fiction book by Candice F. Ransom was published titled Sam Collier and the Founding of Jamestown, which describes Collier's adventures in Virginia.

A children's book about Collier was written by Elisa Carbone titled Blood on the River, which centers on his travels with John Smith.

== See also ==
Other young Virginia colonists who lived with natives

- Thomas Savage (Virginia interpreter)
- Henry Spelman of Jamestown
