= Peracuta =

17th-century leader of the Appomattoc tribe

Peracuta (also spelled Perecuta or Perecute) (birth year unknown – c. 1690) was a 17th-century leader of the Appomattoc tribe in what is now the U.S. state of Virginia. During his reign, he worked with the English colony of Virginia in an attempt to recapture the former power of past paramount chiefs and maintain peaceful unity among the tribe under his leadership.

== Life and rule ==
Peracuta was a respected warrier within the Appomattoc tribe. By the 1660s, Peracuta had become the new weroance of the tribe.

In September 1671, Peracuta was the guide for settlers and explorers Thomas Batts and Robert Fallam on their "Batts and Fallam Expedition" within the borders of present-day West Virginia. They were acting under a commission granted to Abraham Wood "for finding out the ebbing and flowing of the water behind the mountains, in order to the discovery of the South Sea" and authorized by the Virginia House of Burgesses.

The expedition is credited with discovering Woods River, now called the New River. Before leaving and returning home, the party formally declared the river to be a part of the realm of Charles II. Batts and Fallam branded a series of trees with marking irons representing Governor William Berkeley and the sponsor of the expedition, Abraham Wood. They also branded a tree in honor of their trusted guide, Peracuta.

In 1675, the tribe requested that Peracuta be granted permission to plant and clear any land that was note occupied by British Colonists. During this period, the request was granted and Peracuta was formally recognized as "King of the Appomattoc" by the Virginia General Assembly and Governor Berkeley.

Peracuta's time in leadership was met with severe hardship and persecution for Native peoples. The Appomattoc village was destroyed as a result of Bacon's Rebellion in 1676, and in the same year, the practice of slavery of Indians was re-introduced in Virginia colony, caused much suffering to the Appomattoc peoples.

While Peracuta was present at the ceremony for the signing of the Treaty of 1677 (also known as the "Treaty Between Virginia and the Indians" or "Treaty of Middle Plantation"), he was originally not allowed to sign it because some of the members of the Appomattoc tribe were accused of murder at the time. Peracuta was permitted by the British Crown to sign the 1680 annexure of the Treaty of 1677.

== Death ==
Records indicate that Peracuta died c. 1690 and was succeeded by a new weroance by April 1691.
