= Bermuda Hundred, Virginia =

Unincorporated community in Virginia, United States

Coordinates: 37°20′21.8″N 77°16′41.1″W

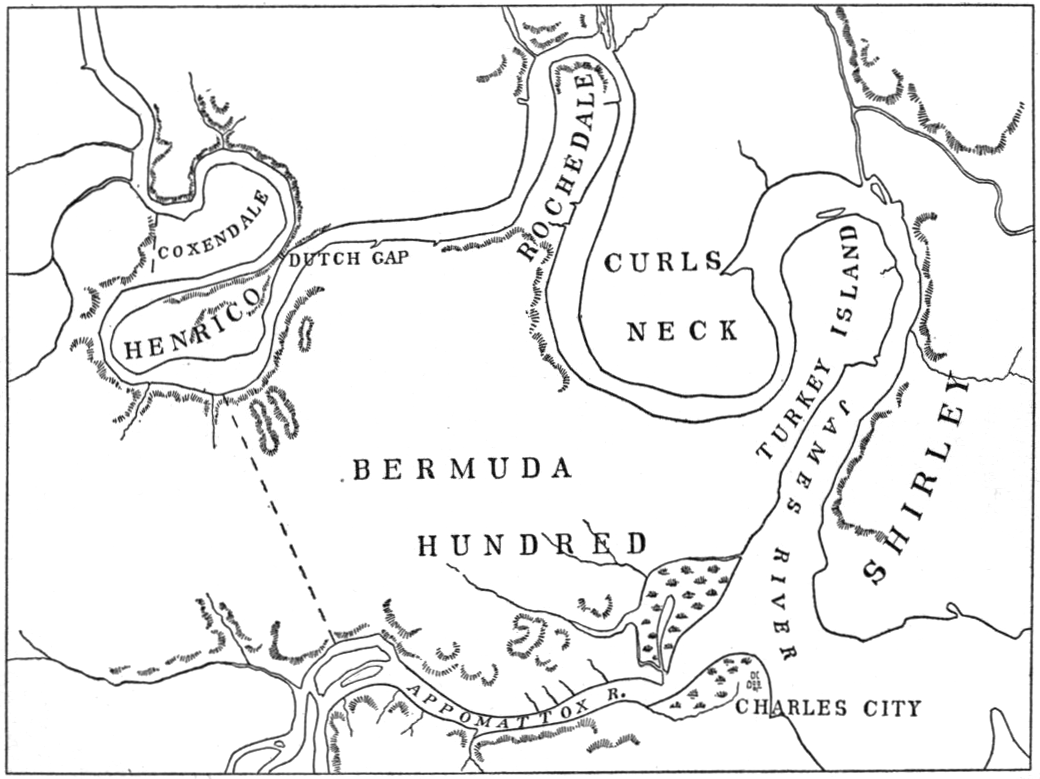
Map showing Bermuda Hundred and other early settlements along the James River

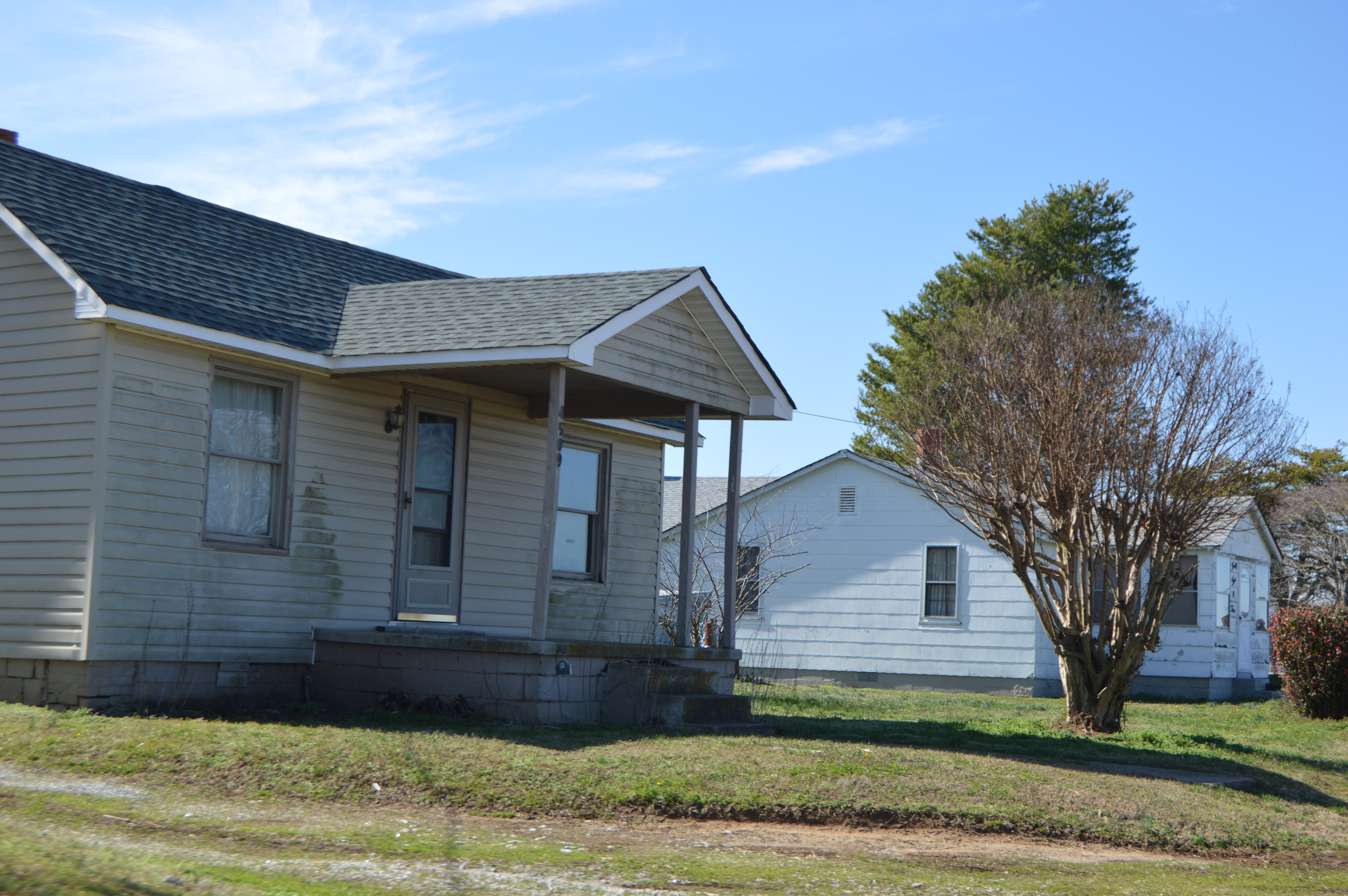
Bermuda Hundred houses

Bermuda Hundred was the first administrative division in the English colony of Virginia. It was founded by Sir Thomas Dale in 1613, six years after Jamestown. At the southwestern edge of the confluence of the Appomattox and James Rivers opposite City Point, annexed to Hopewell in 1923, Bermuda Hundred was a port town for many years. The terminology "Bermuda Hundred" also included a large area adjacent to the town. In the colonial era, "hundreds" were large developments of many acres, arising from the English term to define an area which would support 100 homesteads. The port at the town of Bermuda Hundred was intended to serve other "hundreds" in addition to Bermuda Hundred.

The area of the peninsula between the James and Appomattox Rivers on which Bermuda Hundred is located was part of the Bermuda Hundred Campaign of May 1864 during the American Civil War.

No longer a shipping port, Bermuda Hundred is now a small community in the southeastern portion of Chesterfield County.

== Mattica ==
Prior to English contact, the site was an Appomattoc village shown as "Mattica" on a 1608 Robert Tyndall map. On May 26, 1607, Christopher Newport led a party of 24 English colonists to Mattica. They were welcomed with food and tobacco. He noted the village was surrounded by cornfields, which the Indians cultivated. A weroansqua (female chieftain), Oppussoquionuske, led the village. Their larger village nearby on the north bank of Wighwhippoc Creek, now called Swift Creek, was ruled by the weroance Coquonasum, brother of Oppussoquionuske. Anglo-Native relations deteriorated in 1609, culminating in the First Anglo-Powhatan War by 1610. In the summer of 1610 Opossunoquonuske invited fifteen settlers, who had been collecting water upriver from the settlement at Jamestown, to come to her town. Claiming that the women of the village would be afraid of their weapons, she persuaded the men to leave them in the boat; she then invited them to sit down for a meal, at which she had them ambushed. Her men killed all but one who managed to escape; the survivor, Thomas Dowse, managed to return to the boat and protect himself with the rudder. The men's manner of death is not recorded, nor is it noted if they were tortured. In retaliation, the colonists burned the town and killed several of its inhabitants. Opossunoquonuske herself was reported to have been mortally wounded and to have died that winter. John Smith, in his narrative of the colony, discusses the burning of the town but not the reason behind it, calling the motive only the "injurie done us by them of Apomatock".

Around Christmas 1611, in reprisal for an Appomattoc ambush on a group of colonists a year before, Sir Thomas Dale seized Oppussoquionuske's village and the surrounding cultivated land. He renamed it "New Bermudas".

== Establishment ==
The town of Bermuda Hundred was settled by English colonists in 1613 by Dale and was incorporated the following year. The town, described as a fishing village, was situated "on the peninsula at the confluence of the Appomattox and James Rivers, southeast of Richmond, and northeast of Petersburg." Thomas Dale annexed to his New Bermuda plantation "many miles of champion and wood land ground in several hundreds by the names of Nether Hundred, Shirley Hundred" and so on.

Sir Thomas Dale, who served as Governor of Virginia for about three months in 1611, and from 1614 to 1616, hoped to replace the settlement of Jamestown in a more suitable location a few miles from the town of Bermuda Hundred at Henricus.

Governor Dale initially named the location across the Appomattox River from the town of Bermuda Hundred as "Bermuda Cittie" (sic). The latter was later renamed Charles City Point, and eventually just City Point, before it was annexed by the independent city of Hopewell in 1923. Some sources indicate that Dale called the entire region "New Bermuda" after the island.

== Source of name ==
Bermuda Hundred was named for Bermuda, which became part of the Virginia Colony for a few years after the shipwreck of the ill-starred Sea Venture, the new flagship of the Virginia Company of London. With most of the leaders and supplies aboard the Sea Venture, it was leading the Third Supply mission from England to Jamestown in 1609 when the eight ships ran into a major storm. What was thought to be a hurricane separated them. The new caulking on the Sea Venture caused it to take on water. After the crew fought the storm and bailed water from the holds for three days, the Admiral of the fleet, Sir George Somers, drove the foundering ship onto a reef of the uninhabited archipelago known as Bermuda, saving the 150 passengers and crew (and one dog) aboard. Among these were the newly appointed Governor, future Governor Sir George Yeardley, Sir Thomas Gates, Vice-Admiral Christopher Newport, and future authors William Strachey and Samuel Jordan, as well as John Rolfe, who would later marry Pocahontas.

The fate of the Sea Venture was unknown until the following year. The rest of the fleet sailed on to Jamestown, delivering hundreds of additional colonists. They had little in the way of food, supplies, or leaders, all of which had been principally carried on the Sea Venture. Samuel Argall, the Captain of one of the other ships, delivered his passengers and what supplies he had, and hurried back to England to advise of the dire situation at Jamestown.

In the meantime, the lack of food and supplies and a general Indian blockade on the settlement's ability to hunt, forage, and claim farmland into the interior, combined with the arrival of additional colonists, weak leadership, and several other factors to cause death of over 80% of the 500 colonists at Jamestown in the subsequent year. This period between the fall of 1609 and the spring of 1610, became known as "starving time", and indelibly shaped the community into the remainder of the 17th century as it strove to become more self-sufficient, chose a mixed use of crop, and caused the survivors and subsequent colonists to seek interlocking strategic points along the coasts to control Chesapeake Bay.

Meanwhile, the survivors on Bermuda used salvaged parts of the shipwreck and native materials to build two new, smaller ships, the Deliverance and Patience. Most set sail for Jamestown ten months later, leaving several men to establish English possession of Bermuda. It would remain permanently settled, and Virginia's boundaries were extended in 1612 to include Bermuda. In 1615, Bermuda, also known as the Somers Isles (after Admiral Somers), was transferred to a new company formed by the same shareholders, the Somers Isles Company, which oversaw it until 1684, when the Crown revoked the company's charter. Bermuda and Virginia continued to maintain close links, although there was no possibility of Bermuda joining Virginia and the other mainland colonies in their 1776 rebellion, and Bermuda remains an overseas territory of the United Kingdom. Bermudians settled in North America in large numbers in the 17th and 18th centuries, and many places on the continent are named for the archipelago.

== John Rolfe and tobacco ==
Among the colonists who survived the shipwreck of the Sea Venture at Bermuda and sailed to Virginia was John Rolfe. At Bermuda Hundred, he cultivated and exported several non-native strains of tobacco, providing the proprietary Colony with a crucial cash crop to export. Bermuda Hundred became a major shipping point for hogsheads of tobacco grown on plantations nearby.

Rolfe became wealthy and lived at Bermuda Hundred for a time. He is believed to have been living at a plantation at or near Bermuda Hundred at the time of the great Indian massacre of 1622 which along the murdering of much of the colony's population, destroyed Henricus and the Falling Creek Ironworks upstream on the James River. Although records indicate that he died in 1622, it is not known if he was a victim of the widespread coordinated attacks of the Powhatan Confederacy, which committed the murder of one third of the colonists in several days or if he died by other means.

== Early colonial period ==
With the subsequent victories in the Anglo-Powhatan Wars, and other Indian campaigns, the Bermuda Hundred was able to expand and develop. The area at first was a combined settlement of a few mid-sized plantations, several smaller-sized farms, and the small port town which shipped their produce and needs. For most of the remaining two-thirds of the century, this mixed-use economy marked the Bermuda Hundred, thereby helping the community to grow. In turn, slowly the population recovered from the Indian attacks, and although outbreaks of Indian diseases continued to occur, new colonists arrived to keep the colony and Bermuda Hundred growing.

However, starting in the second half of the 17th century and gaining momentum, a huge growth in demand first in sugar and then in tobacco occurred causing the countryside to slowly change crops despite earlier colonial policy. Additionally, the Indians were pushed back in several campaigns, allowing for the expansion in size of the plantation, and another growth of population which put additional pressures on land and small farms.

Slowly, over the remaining century and into the early 18th century, the farms turned to the valuable but land-depleting sugar and tobacco crops. As the soil depleted, requiring more and more land, large numbers of African slaves were brought into work the mortgaged land cheaply, thereby creating an economy of capital centralization. Consequently, most of the smaller surrounding Yeoman farms were absorbed into the plantations, their inhabitants falling into dependency to the planter class, turning to the town, or moving westward for cheaper land.

== Later colonial period ==
With this growth and evolving economy, the port and town also experienced expansion. Ironically, while originally serving both as a local tide-water port and an oceangoing port, as the cash crops pushed out the local consumption crops, thereby reducing the number of farms, and more slaves caused an increase in acreage and corresponding decrease in the number of plantations, the shippers required larger boats to carry the produce. Simultaneously, the growth in farmland starting increasing silt downriver into the port. Thus, as the port began silting up it was only maintained by dredging which required additional costs on the shippers already competing for capital to build larger boats.

Nonetheless, despite this increased competition, the port retained a good number of merchants devoted to the tidewater trade and import and export trade with the Great Britain and Ireland. Additionally, its shippers served in transporting and off-loading the continually growing numbers of settlers migrating from Europe (primarily as indentured servants) into the American colonies. Most of these migrants went on to settle further westward of the Tidewater, later into the Piedmont, and finally into the Great Wagon Road, and the Wilderness Road which led them further west. The combination of import and export trade, indenture transportation, slave importations, and the consequent requirements in parts and repair to maintain this small merchant fleet resulted in a flourishing mercantile community and an increase in the towns population.

By the time of independence, the area had long ceased being the mixed economy of the 17th century and turned into becoming slow, easy going and peaceful area of a few rich plantations and a slowly declining port. Several of the original colonial families remained but had become a minority as indentured servants from Europe, arrived, intermingled with the original colonists, new settlers replaced those old families who left west, and finally large numbers of black indentured servants and then slaves pushed out most of the original middling and working settler classes.

== French and Indian War and Pre-Revolutionary War period ==
By the 1760s, the threat of Indian violence and economic deprivation in the tidewater region including the Bermuda Hundreds had dissipated as a result of victory and integration between Virginia and other British colonies. Despite restrictions on trading with other parts colonies, the Tidewater had full participation in the British Atlantic World and many of its families were educated in Britain and Ireland. The merchant firms had developed deep and lasting relationships with other firms in the Empire and cash was readily available for capital improvement. The old colonial planters had developed into a strong plantocracy noted for supporting additional colonial expansion westward. Indeed, many of the frontier families had come from older colonial settlers originally from the tidewater region and places like the Bermuda Hundreds. Many of the Tidewater's plantocracy's junior members and cadet branches had moved westward and played leading roles in establishing new settlements and networks thereby keeping the unity of colonial society. Thus, an economic, social, and political expansion had developed in which the Tidewater plantocracy played a key role in integrating the frontier with the Tidewater and henceforth with the larger British Empire.

Indeed, many of the frontier families had come from older colonial settlers originally from the tidewater region and places like the Bermuda Hundreds. Many of the Tidewater's colonial junior members and cadet branches had moved westward and played leading roles in establishing new settlements and networks thereby keeping the unity of colonial society. Thus, the massive eruption of Indian violence and full-scale war on the frontier effected the Tidewater keenly despite not being directly attacked. The genocide of large numbers of the frontier families, the desperate battles in the forests, and sieges of the settler forts, recalled the days of the older Tidewater Indian wars which had almost destroyed the colony entirely. Now the battles and losses were even larger. The threat of a full-scale collapse of the frontier and the arrival of huge Franco-Indian armies presaged notions of annihilation. Consequently, with the outbreak of massive Indian wars on the frontiers and the involvement of large French armies, the Bermuda Hundreds was notably involved in supplying the arms, men, officers, and materials for the war effort.

The war resulted in a severe check on the migration westward of new British settlers as well as colonial natives from the Hundreds. The horror of the losses gave pause to further expansion. More importantly, the Royal government had broken its obligations toward settlers, and thus with the Tidewater plantocracy when it refused to honor recent frontier treaties with the Proclamation of 1763. The proclamation was the result of secret negotiation between the Royal government and Indian tribes by which the frontier settlers were deprived of their land and property and any further expansion westward of British colonies was permanently halted.

Economically, socially, and politically, the war, peace treaty and proclamation was decisive in changing the life of the Bermuda Hundreds. Indeed, it was a major check on the continued evolution of the socio-economic live of the area. Previously, the change from a mixed economy featured by small farmers and shippers to a commercial economy of planters and merchants had only occurred without widespread social upheaval through the growth of new opportunities westward. Land pressure was relieved, smaller yeoman farmers were able to maintain their existence by providing for the larger Tidewater region as well as the frontier, merchants were prosperous from supporting both, and the planter class maintained its wealth and position.

However, the proclamation and halt to further expansion threatened this existence. More importantly, such perfidy by their own government caused a political upheaval in the Hundreds as middle-class locals and those frontier families being agitating against the presumed treason of the crown. Consequently, the planter classes debated how best to respond. Despite this continual economic growth and the increasing numbers of colonists arriving in the port, the consequence of a slave economy and globalism began to become apparent. Starting in the first quarter of the 18th century, the population of the colonial hundreds peaked. Slowly, a combination of capitalistic centralizing movements created by prevailing theories of mercantilism and the use of slavery by Virginian planters, caused an actual reduction in the numbers of European colonists in the Hundreds, as the middling level of planters, farmers, merchants, and arts and craftsmen were driven out or turned westward for better opportunities. At first, they were replaced by indentured servants, and then as slavery became all powerful, they were replaced by cheap black slaves, thereby causing further pressures on the remaining colonial working classes to move elsewhere. Nonetheless, the area maintained a slight majority of European colonists despite the large numbers of African slaves until just prior to the Revolutionary period.

Thus, by the time of independence, the area had long ceased being the mixed economy of the 17th century and had become interdependent with the wider British Empire. Rather than a mixed local economy, it was integrated with the much larger Virginia Colony, much of the remaining American colonies, and yet was still dependent upon Great Britain both socially, politically, and even economically. For the Bermuda Hundreds, the majority of the remaining planters and especially what remained of the yeoman and town folk the answer was clear. Secession from the British Empire and the Declaration of Independence despite whatever economic losses might occur. The French and Indian War had proven a decisively changing event in the direction of the colony.

== Revolutionary War period ==
From the 1750s to the 1780s, as a result of war on the frontier, war with independence, continual war with the Indians after independence, the loss of population was temporarily halted while the commercial activity and income producing of cash crops was disrupted. Meanwhile, the Bermuda Hundreds had turned into a peaceful area of a few rich plantations and a slowly declining port. Several of the original colonial families remained but had become a minority as indentured servants from Ireland, England, and Scotland, arrived, intermingled with the original colonists, new settlers replaced those old families who left west, and finally large numbers of black indentured servants and then slaves pushed out much of the original middling and working settler classes. Nonetheless, many of those original colonial families which remained, maintained their grip on life in the Hundreds.

Despite their ties to Great Britain and Ireland, within America, but outside of the Bermuda Hundreds and larger Tidewater region, the colonial planters, yeoman farmers, merchant families, and ship owners were part of a larger social, political and economic network which they were loyal to. As a result of independence, the large numbers of Americans which had begun increasing as a result of the backlog from moving westward joined the war effort. Bermuda Hundred planter families supplied officers in the Virginia and Continental Army. At first, no major British forces managed to invade the region. Nonetheless, British fleet operations succeeded in making landing raids throughout the Bermuda Hundreds lighting afire numerous houses presumed owned by patriots. Although most fought for Americans, there were several who fought for the Loyalists and as a result had their own plantations destroyed.

These devastating but minor engagements were soon changed with the arrival of a combined British fleet and army operation under General Charles Cornwallis, 1st Marquess Cornwallis whose grand strategy of subduing the Americans was first setback in the Southern states, when his armies were defeated at Kings Mountain, only a day's march from Cornwallis and his army, and then his own army decisively defeated at Cowpens. With the southern campaign checked, Cornwallis received dispatches in Wilmington, North Carolina informing him that another British army under Generals William Phillips and Benedict Arnold had been sent to Virginia. Believing that North Carolina could not be subdued unless its supply lines from Virginia were cut, he decided to join forces with Phillips and since his army was still strong enough to strike directly into Virginia's tidewater and the heart of the Patriot resistance.

In March 1781, in response to the threat posed by Arnold and Phillips, General Washington had dispatched Marquis de Lafayette to defend Virginia. The young Frenchman had 3,200 men at his command, but British troops in the state now totaled 7,200 and they soon quickly brushed aside the militia of the Bermuda Hundreds. Lafayette skirmished with Cornwallis, avoiding a decisive battle while gathering reinforcements. It was during this period that Cornwallis received orders from Clinton to choose a position on the Virginia Peninsula—referred to in contemporary letters as the "Williamsburg Neck"—and construct a fortified naval post to shelter ships of the line.

However, by marching down the Tidewater and eventually occupying the Bermuda Hundreds in complying with this order, Cornwallis put himself in a position to become trapped. Indeed, as a result of the rapidity and secrecy of movement by General George Washington from New York City, New York, and the arrival of the French fleet under the Comte de Grasse the combined French-American army, Cornwallis found himself cut off. After the Royal Navy fleet under Admiral Thomas Graves was defeated by the French at the Battle of the Chesapeake, and the French siege train arrived from Newport, Rhode Island, to surround him in the Hundreds, his Cornwallis' position became untenable. He surrendered to General Washington and the French commander, the Comte de Rochambeau, on 19 October 1781. Cornwallis, apparently not wanting to face Washington, claimed to be ill on the day of the surrender, and sent Brigadier General Charles O'Hara in his place to surrender his sword formally. Washington had his second-in-command, Benjamin Lincoln, accept Cornwallis' sword.

== American and Antebellum period ==
Whilst the French and Indian Wars and subsequent Proclamation of 1763 temporarily checked the irresistible move westwards, and thus slowed the decline of colonists leaving the Hundreds this changed with the gaining of independence. The subsequent decisive defeat of the Indians on the frontier, and the opening of the western roads, allowed more and more of the Hundreds' American inhabitants in moving westward to pursue opportunity in the West.

Furthermore, the rural economy, already depleted of large numbers of its American rural class turning westward, saw additional losses as the planters, were now unable to sufficiently work the soil, both from losses of income as a result of the war as well as soil depletion. Additionally, many of the oldest and magnificent plantation houses were in ruins as a result of economic and wartime devastation. As their previous commercial ties with the British empire were broken, war debts were astronomical, and economic dislocation was widespread, specie was rare for the planters who struggled to recover their economic footing. Many of the oldest families were subsumed into their fellow planters, moved westward, and some even forced out for being Loyalists.

However, those which survived found an opportunity with the abolition of the slave trade. For, paradoxically, with slavery abolition, the value of slaves increased. Thus, while their land recovered, the planters began selling off their slave population excess to newer plantations westward and south-westward in the richer farmlands thereby managing to pay off their war debts, rebuilding some of the older plantation houses, and keeping their positions of privilege and economic dominance.

Thus, despite these losses, the rural plantation economy managed to navigate the crisis and kept the community viable. In turn, tenant farmers and a few independent farmers filled in the niche providing needed food consumption to the regions consumers. Lastly, as income continued to recover, most of the remaining white rural and working class became employed as laborers, as plantation work overseers, skilled workers and servants, or as county law enforcement and civil servants such as Patrol constables, and Road agents, thereby gaining important cash from supporting the plantations and government.

While the countryside sought to recover and found niche markets, the town and port was faced with a similar problem. The war had severely disrupted the economy that had developed in the 18th century. Much of the commerce which had existed with Great Britain and Ireland was destroyed as a result of the war and the independence of the country. Heavy trade restrictions which had not previously existed were placed upon the new American state. The Napoleonic Wars further retarded international trade. Furthermore, British and Irish migration halted for most of the next thirty years, and what later did occur gravitated to ports elsewhere. The abolition of the American slave trade also wiped much of the commercial activity in the port. Simultaneously, the large plantations had severely depleted the soil, and crop production was severely limited, further eliminating commercial activity in the town.

Yet, as the newly independent nation recovered from the disruptions in trade and replaced it with more domestic trade, the expanding economy began being felt further into the tidewater. The continued maintenance of the planter class and a few farming families continued demand for consumer and luxury goods in the area. Soon, the loss of shipping goods in the British Empire was being replaced by local and domestic shipping, especially with New England. These trade routes continued to favor smaller craft more easily built and maintained in small ports like in the Bermuda Hundreds. Furthermore, other parts of the great bay saw a renewal in farming and fishing which soon benefited the small port.

Eventually, a careful economic balance was reached, as most of the remaining white rural community eked out pleasant existence as subsistence growers, selling their surplus crop to the local towns and plantations along the Tidewater, and working part-time on the plantations and in the towns for additional income and a place in society. Slowly, starting in the 1820s parts of the Hundreds began returning to crop production and a majority of the land was back in production by the 1850s.

Consequently, although far from their early colonial magnificence, the planter families and what remained of the small yeoman class and small boat owners continued their generally tranquil and slightly prosperous lives into the ante-bellum period, supported by a small but well developed arts and crafts town class, small but prosperous merchant family firms, and a larger but almost poor white supervisory and working class which lived in the town, as well as the larger population of enslaved and free Blacks living in the countryside. Furthermore, although no longer the all powerful statutes they had held, unlike in the North, the Southern states, including the Tidewater regions such as the Bermuda Hundreds, continued to retain social and political status in their communities, thereby retaining power in the state of Virginia and the country as a whole. Indeed, at the time of the Civil War, planter classes such as in Bermuda and their cadet branches elsewhere throughout the south, provided upwards of sixty-five percent of the country's leading strategists, military commanders, and political leaders.

== Civil War period ==
As the Civil War began, the Bermuda Hundred and surrounding countryside had mostly receded into a backwater. Some of the original plantations had fallen into dilapidation and disrepair by the beginning of the war and remained as monuments to a long-ago past when the area was a center of the Virginia economy. Several country estates yet remained in the Bermuda Hundred including, Presquile, Mont Blanco, Rochedale, and Meadowville, as well as nearby Varina, Shirley, Curles Neck, Appomattox, and Weston Manor, the large plantations which continued to dominate the surrounding country life. A number of independent farmers, fresh with prosperity derived from supporting local consumption gained additional income with smaller production of cash crops. Smaller part-time farmers, overseers, and tenant farmers lived in the countryside as well, holding smaller but well built colonial brick homes. Other Virginians, employed as part-time laborers on the farms and plantations and in the larger towns also lived in their own communities in the countryside or town, while the large Black population lived a restricted life on the plantations themselves.

Inside the town, the period of merchant adventurers had long become a thing of the past, leaving the merchants more as factors and shipping agents for what remained of the agricultural community. These merchant families earned an income from trading cotton, tobacco and other commercial crops both in the state, in the nation, and internationally. Additionally, a community of fishermen continued to work the great Chesapeake Bay, alongside a small class of artisan, craftsmen, boat wrights, and small freight shippers working the traffic along the bay as well as trade further into New England.

The War of Independence was still fresh in the memories of residents of the Bermuda Hundreds. The issues seemed very similar to them and most made valid arguments to the same themes as dominated the Revolutionary debates generations before. Believing that the coming northern Republican Party dominance were threats to the supremacy of the hearth and home, the right of independent yeoman farmer to be supreme in his property, and most importantly, that abolition was being discussed were greeted with consternation. Several families remained who had served and fought in the war, the grandchildren of their Revolutionary heroes now in command of the debate. Fortune had been sacrificed for their beliefs, and despite the overwhelming odds, the same families pledged their fortunes as well and were loyally greeted as their rightful leaders by the mass of working and farming class Americans in the South.

With the coming of war the area was pressed entirely into the war effort. As the chaos of war spread its way south, and the Union navy put its blockade upon the port, much of the small shipping fleet was captured, destroyed, or lay in disrepair. Those that remained were pressed into being Union blockade runners. Furthermore, a trickle but worrisome number of slaves began escaping. More and more of the white population volunteered into the Confederate Army. Most of the planter class joined the officer corps of the Confederacy, with many killed in the subsequent campaigns. Soon, the old and young were put into defensive work, keeping the countryside clear of escaped slaves and Union raiding parties. Eventually, what remained of the white population was formed into a home guard militia supplemented by veterans from the campaigns in the North as a large Union invading army arrived at the area.

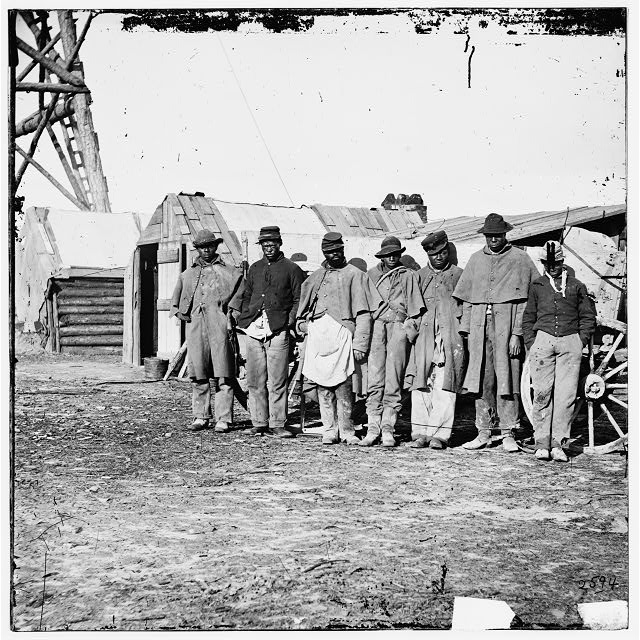
African Americans, freed from plantation slaveholders, worked as teamsters at Bermuda Hundred to help the U.S. forces that freed them from the rebels of the civil war.

Surviving on a barely prosperous plantation economy, the region was critically damaged in the subsequent Civil War campaigns, principally the Bermuda Hundred Campaign. The Bermuda Hundred Campaign was a series of battles fought in the vicinity of the town during May 1864, in the American Civil War. Union Maj. Gen. Benjamin Butler, commanding the Army of the James, threatened Richmond from the east, but was stopped by Confederate forces under Gen. P.G.T. Beauregard. The Howlett Line from the James to the Appomattox effectively "bottled up" the northern army on the Bermuda Hundred peninsula. The Campaign was one of the last victories of the Confederacy and General Benjamin Butler was transferred elsewhere.

== Reconstruction, Post-bellum era, modern times ==
The war and the campaign had ruined what remained of the planter class fortunes and a number of families both rich and poor had been wiped out. The battles had destroyed or heavily damaged much of the countryside's physical infrastructure and homes. The population of enslaved Blacks had declined heavily through escape during the war and the subsequent emancipation of slaves. The devastation of the plantation economy also wreaked havoc on the small white communities in the countryside. Most of these white laborers, as plantation work overseers, skilled workers and servants, or as county law enforcement and civil servants such as Patrol constables, and Road agents, gained important cash from supporting the plantations and government. Consequently, with the end of the antebellum economy and Reconstruction, aside from suffering losses to its male population in the war, these white families now faced an unemployable economy. As a result, along with much of what remained of the slave population they turned to sharecropping and became notoriously impoverished. Others turned to the small town or slowly drifted elsewhere across the country. The Hundreds never again recovered its early population level into the 21st century.

Inside the town, the physical structures had been damaged as well. Most of the capital stock was seized by the Union Army, including the precious stock need for building and repairing boats or creating the arts and crafts for supporting the community in its quality of life. With war's end, the town's population temporarily increased with the arrival of large numbers from the countryside putting massive pressure on the town. With the loss of much of the boats, the fishing and small freight trading businesses were wiped out permanently. Finally, without capital to stop silting or dredge, the port's ability to handle traffic further decreased.

Unable to ship their commercial crops while the shipping businesses struggled to rebuild, the planter class endeavored to create other avenues of transportation and rebuild the economy through land infrastructure improvement, especially in railroads. Whilst losing their fortune, the planter and mercantile classes still retained their privileged positions in politics. Navigating the treacherous waterways of Reconstruction, some managed to bring capital into the area for building up a new railway structure.

After the American Civil War, the Brighthope Railway in Chesterfield county was rerouted from Osborne's Landing to Bermuda Hundred. It was extended west to Epps Falls on the Appomattox River and narrowed to be a narrow gauge railroad. The Brighthope Railway went bankrupt and was sold to become part of the Farmville and Powhatan Railroad. The Farmville and Powhatan Railroad, later renamed the Tidewater and Western Railroad, ran to the headwaters of the Appomattox River at the town of Farmville through Cumberland, Powhatan. Although decisively helpful in keeping the agricultural community from total loss, especially in regards to bringing in valued specie into the local economy, it nonetheless failed in fulfilling its wider aims of putting the planter class back into financial prosperity.

The Great Depression of 1873, and subsequent farming depressions, and most importantly the growth of Egyptian cotton and Indian cotton pushed aside American cotton, which had previously provided the prosperity of the planter class. Although this decreased the demand and forced a change to crops such as corn, and wheat thereby restoring soil health, the new crops did not bring in enough wealth or traffic to the growers, merchant class, and railroad. Still, the growers experimented with multi-crop rotation, schemes at sharecropping and tenant farming, and eventually earned valuable income from tobacco in later decades. The number of plantations never recovered, yet, ironically several of the sharecroppers and tenant farmers managed to evolve into a yeoman farmers. However, the setbacks in economic markets and demand, domestic and foreign competition, all combined to keep the narrow gauge railroad from generating sufficient traffic and rebuilding the antebellum prosperity. Ironically, it did succeed in returning the area to its 17th-century period of mixed economy, thereby allowing the continued survival and slow economic growth of the region.

Meanwhile in the town, much as in the countryside, the war caused at least a generational, if not two-generational, economic loss. By the time some of the planter class had restored their infrastructure, trading networks, and crop production back to their antebellum periods, the country and world had changed dramatically. They never recovered their former prosperity from the land and many lost or sold their land. As a result, despite every effort, the returns of the railroad and the merchant firms barely made a profit over a sixty-year period, while simultaneously depriving the town's waterway shipping business. In turn, the town never recovered its merchant sector instead slowly declining into a small fishing village and local tidewater harbor. Eventually, like another railway about 15 miles downstream at Claremont, the railroad and port facilities were largely abandoned by the Great Depression, turning the town into a pale shell of its former times.

In modern times, the town of Bermuda Hundred is settled by approximately four families: the McWilliams, the Hewletts, the Johnsons, and a Gray. In the 1980s Phillip Morris opened a Tobacco Processing facility at Bermuda Hundred. This was soon followed by an Allied Signal plant, and an industrial facility operated by Imperial Chemical Industries. In 1990 the Varina-Enon Bridge opened connecting the once rural area to Richmond via Interstate 295. As a result, by the end of the first decade of the 21st century most of the remaining farms, and former plantations in the Bermuda Hundred such as Presquile, Mount Blanco, Meadowville, and Rochedale had been sold for commercial or residential development. A portion of Presquile farm is preserved as the Presquile National Wildlife Refuge.

== First Baptist Church Bermuda Hundred ==
Established circa 1850, the Baptist church was built in the Greek Revival style with a symmetrical three-bay, gable-front facade on land that served as the market square of the town. The land on which the church sits was the Southside chapel of the 17th-century Varina Parish and the main church of Bristol Parish.

Unlike many churches in the area, the church originally served both blacks and whites, and both rich and poor; this was likely due to a long-established presence of both emancipated and enslaved black families living in the area over several generations. However, the congregation remained segregated, requiring both enslaved and free blacks to sit in the balcony while whites sat in the lower area. Over time, an increasing number of poor and working-class white congregants forced some whites to sit in the balcony, causing substantial resentment within the church.

Prior to the Civil War, several white congregants joined the Southern Baptists, separating from the national association over the issue of slavery. These congregants left First Baptist to form what is presently known as Enon Baptist Church in nearby Chester, VA, leaving the historic congregation under the capable leadership of the thriving free black congregation. Several black Baptist congregations in Chesterfield County and Hopewell trace their roots to the free black congregation at First Baptist.

== Town of Bermuda Hundred Historic District ==
- Town of Bermuda Hundred Historic District
- U.S. National Register of Historic Places
- U.S. Historic district
- Virginia Landmarks Register
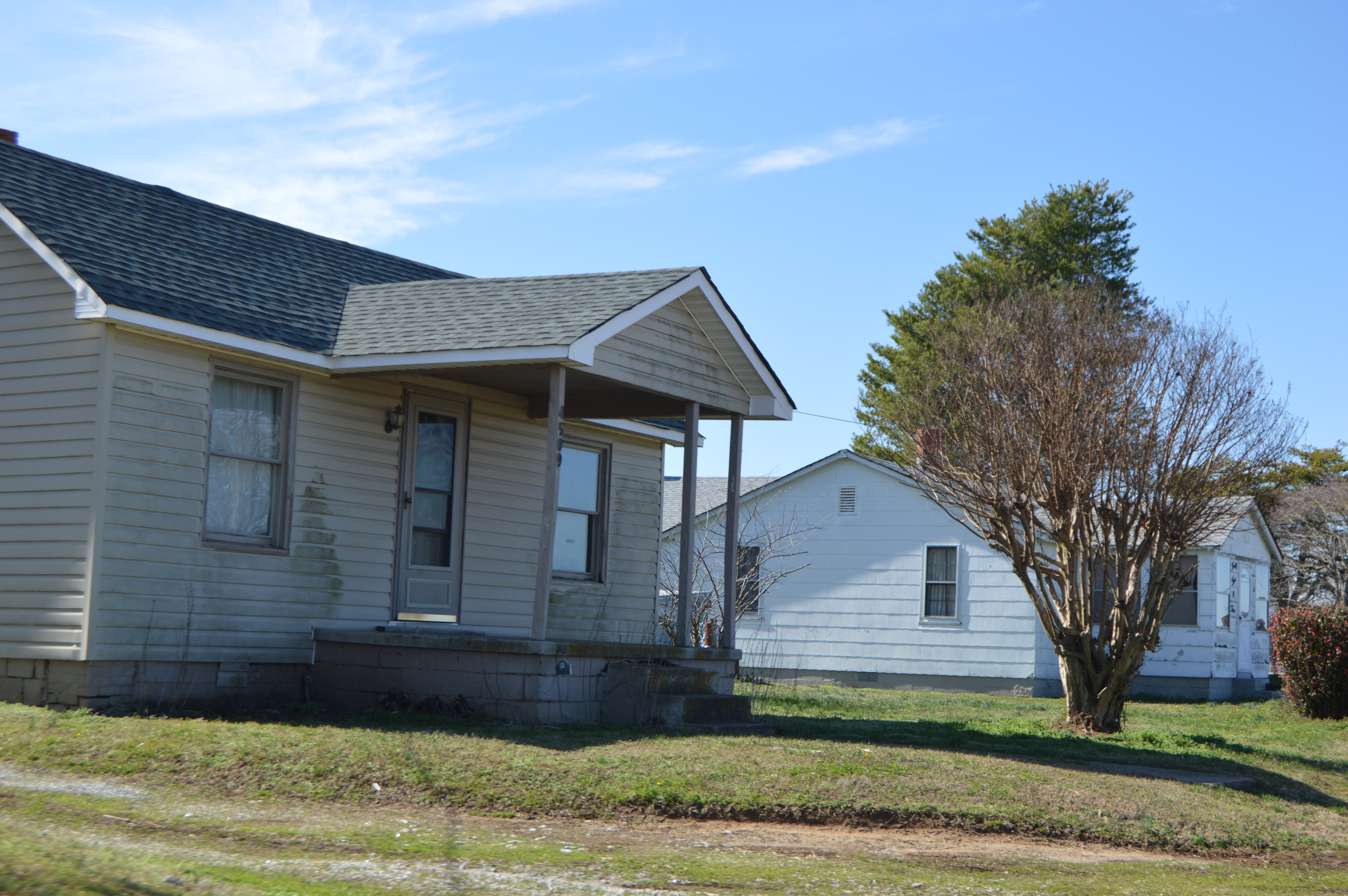
- Houses east of the Methodist church

- Location within Virginia Location within the United States
- Location: Both sides of Bermuda Hundred and Allied Rds.
- Area: 16.2 acres (6.6 ha)
- Built: 1613
- MPS: Prehistoric through Historic Archeological and Architectural Resources at Bermuda Hundred MPS
- NRHP reference No.: 06001011
- VLR No.: 020-0064

Significant dates
- Added to NRHP: November 8, 2006
- Designated VLR: September 6, 2006

The Town of Bermuda Hundred Historic District is a national historic district located on both sides of Bermuda Hundred and Allied Roads at Chester, Virginia. The district includes 14 contributing buildings, 1 contributing site, and 1 contributing objects.

It was listed on the National Register of Historic Places in 2006.

== See also ==
- Dale's Pale Archeological District
