= Native American women in Colonial America =

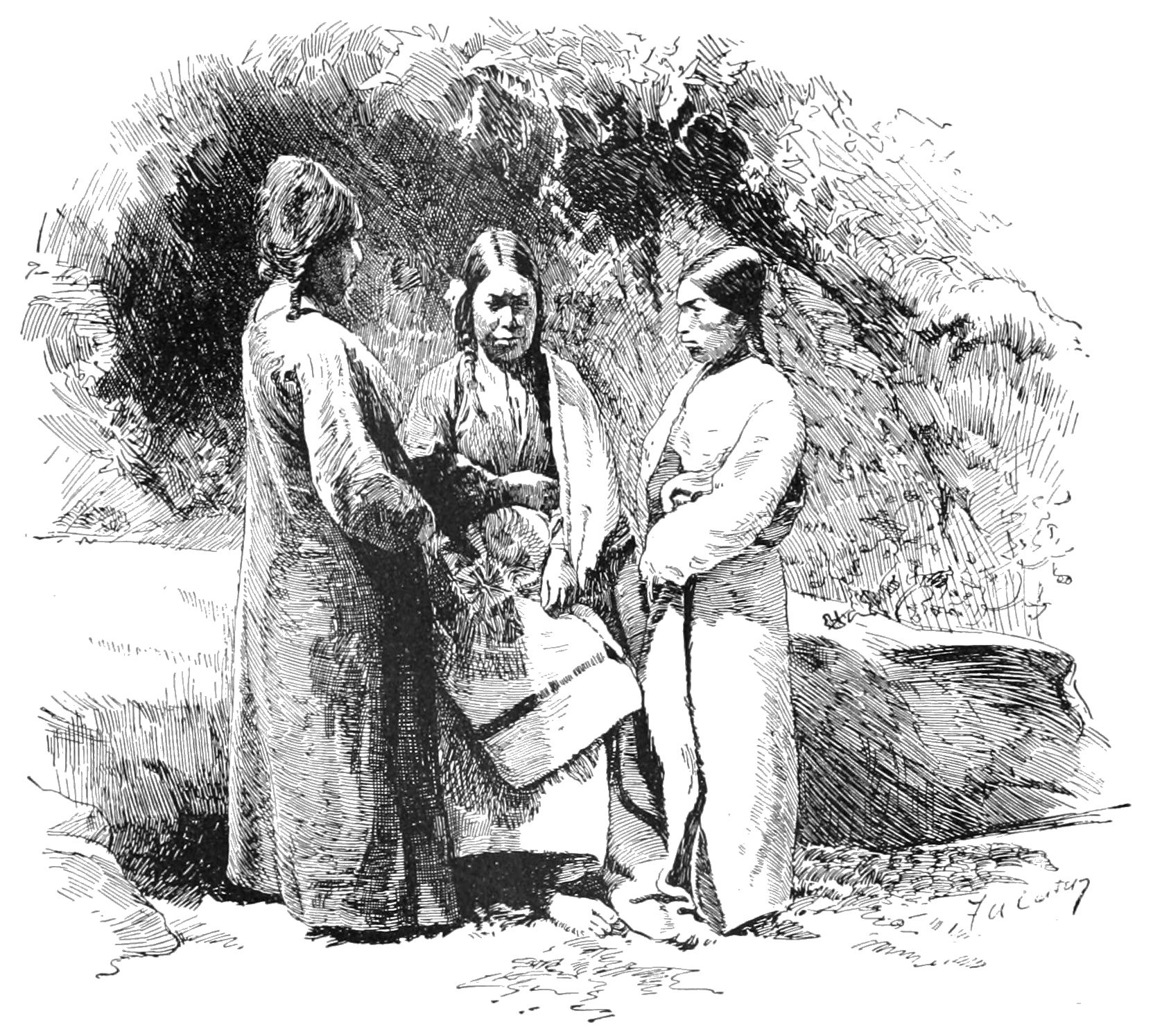
Native American women

Before and during the colonial period of North America, Native American women had a role in society that contrasted with that of the settlers. Many women were leaders in Native American tribes. For example, Cherokee women worked in treaty negotiations with the United States, and women in the Haudenosaunee Confederacy acted, and continue to act, as political leaders and choose chiefs. Other women were delegated the task of caring for children and preparing meals; their other roles varied between tribal groups. In many tribes, such as the Algonquins and the Six Nations that compose the Haudenosaunee Confederacy, women were responsible for tending to the fields while the men were responsible for hunting. There were often long periods in which the men were not present. Thus, women played a major role in the family and exerted significant control over social and economic factors within the tribes.

== Life in society ==
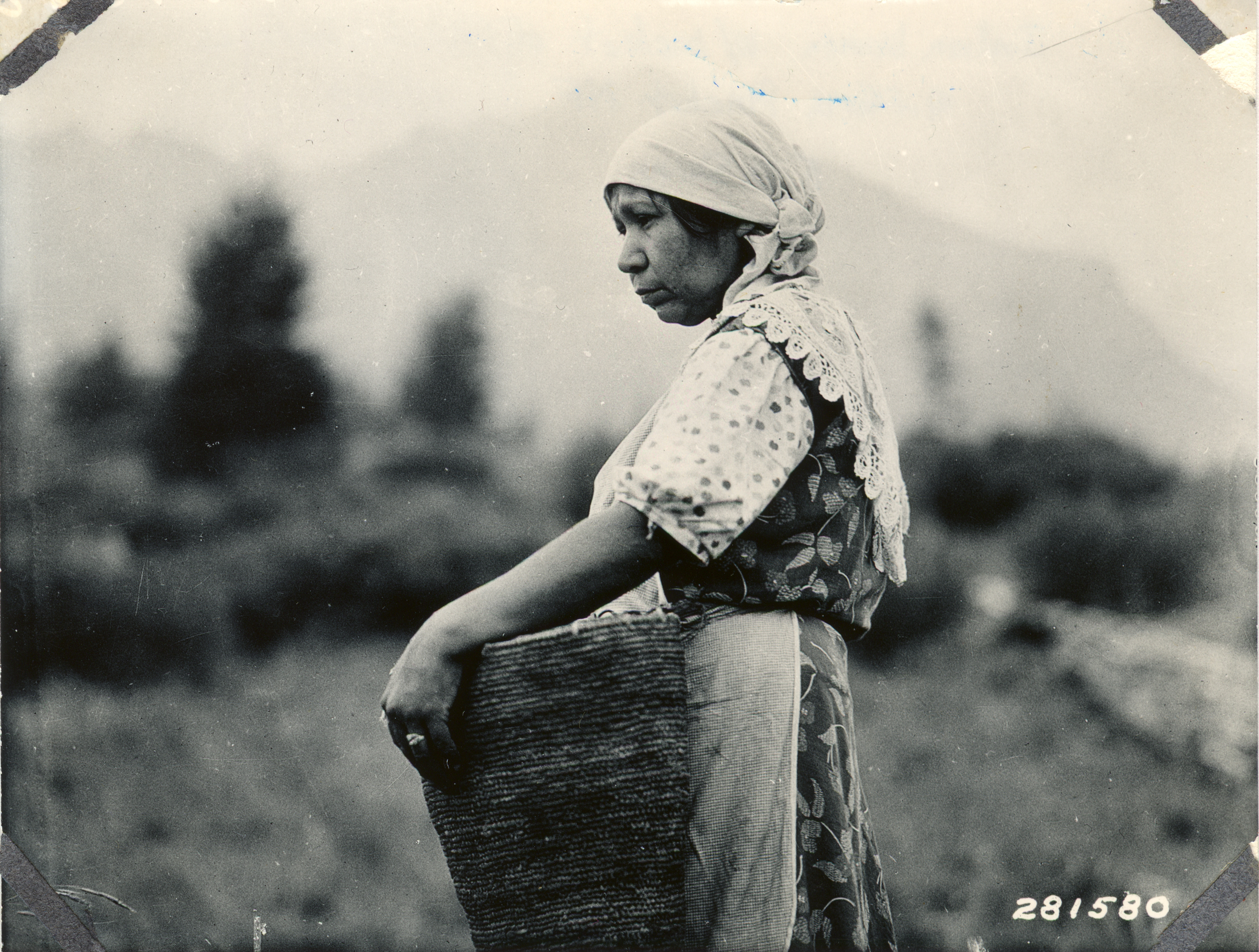
Native American woman at work

Life in society varies from tribe to tribe and region to region, but some general perspectives of women include that they "value being mothers and rearing healthy families; spiritually, they are considered to be extensions of the Spirit Mother and continuators of their people; socially, they serve as transmitters of cultural knowledge and caretakers of children and relatives." Many Native American tribes believed that they originated from a woman, with many of their legends and creation stories depict a "mother earth." Women were entrusted with overseeing a tribe's agricultural systems, and were responsible for harvesting and cultivating the vegetables and plants for their people. Tribal women like the Algonquians planted their fields meticulously and in a way that kept the land sustainable for future use. After harvesting a tract of land until the soil lacked nutrients to continue, women would be tasked with deciding when and where to clear new fields, allowing the used ones to regenerate. Women in the Haudenosaunee tribes often controlled the distribution of food among their people. Their perceived position as beings of spiritual power gave women in some tribes the opportunity to be healers for minor injuries, as men were more commonly shamans, chiefs, and herbalists.

== Leaders ==
Some Native American peoples were known for having women sit in positions of political power beyond simply controlling the food or being "agricultural scientists." Elder women in the Haudenosaunee tribes gathered in clans to decide who would sit on the tribe or village council, including the appointment of 49 chiefs within the confederacy.

Women also learned skills in hunting and fishing. Others, such as Weetamoo, the female chief of the Pocasset Wampanoag, led their people in battle. It was not unusual for women to go into combat. Women would often enter a battle to protect or substitute for their fallen husbands or brothers, and some women earned warrior titles for their participation. Women who sat as leaders of their tribes, like Queen Anne and Weetamoo, were known for their participation in wars.

== Religion ==
During the colonial period, Native American religion was heavily integrated in all aspects of Native life, influencing culture, art, history, politics, and economics. Many Natives believed both animals and plants had spirits.

Menstruation was spiritually significant in some cultures. For example, some male hunters among the Shawnee, Creek, Cherokee, and Cree, would avoid contact with any woman who was menstruating during their hunt because a woman is at her most powerful, with the association of menstruating with life force, and this power would disrupt the men's power to kill. Even walking near a woman during this time was believed to impact that killing power the men possessed. During this time, women would stay in hunts away from their village to ensure their power didn't disrupt the regular schedule. This practice acknowledged the power of Native Women within the culture and also allowed for a break from their regular activities and roles.

The Apaches, as well as other Native American people, believed that women have spiritual power, and some respected elder women use their important spiritual and social authority within the tribe.

== Gender roles ==
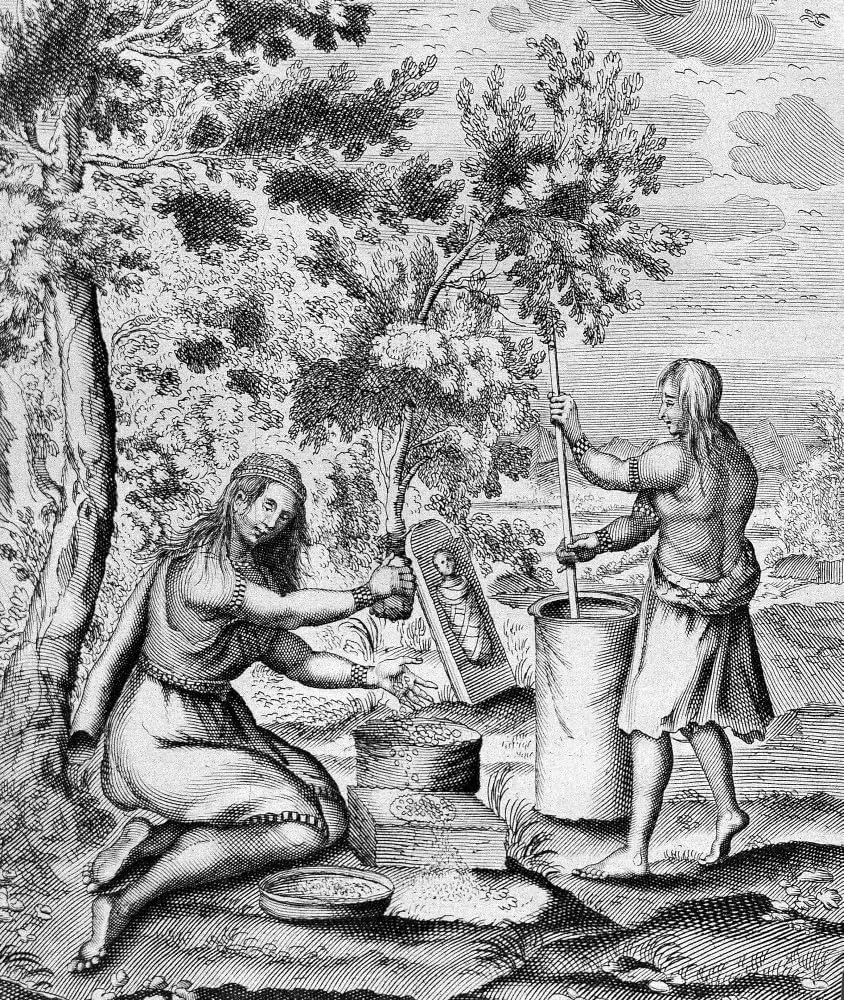
Depiction of Haudenosaunee women

Traditional gender roles transformed upon European colonization of North America. Before contact with European colonizers, several Native American cultures were matrilineal, meaning that women, rather than men, passed on clan membership to their children. After marriage, husbands left their household and joined their wives' families. Historian Katy Simpson Smith described eighteenth-century Cherokee motherhood as a "social, economic, and political institution" which included "not only the relationship between biological mother and child, but also women's broader kin networks, their productive connection to fertile land and economic subsistence, and their political role as mothers of the Cherokee nation." Cherokee acknowledged the prominent role of motherhood in their culture by calling all female relatives "mother." The Hopi were both matriarchal and matrilineal, with equalitarian roles in society. Women also participate in Hopi politics.

In many Native American cultures, although male family members arranged marriages, wives controlled whether or not they wanted a divorce. In the Haudenosaunee tribes and Cherokee Nation, a woman could leave her husband's belongings outside their door to show that she wanted a divorce.

Upon contact with European colonizers, some tribes adopted a patriarchal system of gender roles that resembled European culture. In the Cherokee Nation, a series of laws passed by the Cherokee Council over the course of the nineteenth century restricted women's sexual freedom, including the criminalization of abortion. The Council also passed laws which introduced new patrilineal forms of inheriting property and establishing citizenship. Historian Theda Perdue suggests that changes to Cherokee gender roles were "superficial" before removal, and that the Council's series of bills represented a point of view "limited perhaps to the Cherokee elite who sought to emulate white southern planters."

In the Lakota tribes, there was the legend of the "Double Woman Dreamer" who behaved in masculine ways and had special powers. This spurred on the concepts of warrior women or "manly hearted women" who acted like men in hunting and during warfare. There was the counterpart role for men of the "berdache," a role where a man could dress and take on the responsibilities of a woman. This designation is also referred to as "two-spirit" in modern American Indian cultures.

In the Apache tribe, girls are not recognized as a woman until they have gone through the Sunrise Ceremony. The Apache Sunrise Ceremony is a four-day coming of age celebration that Apache girls experience soon after their first menstruation. Throughout the sacred ceremony, they dance to songs and prayers to fill themselves with the physical and spiritual power of White Painted Woman to embrace their role as a woman of the Apache nation.

== Effect of Europeans on Native women ==
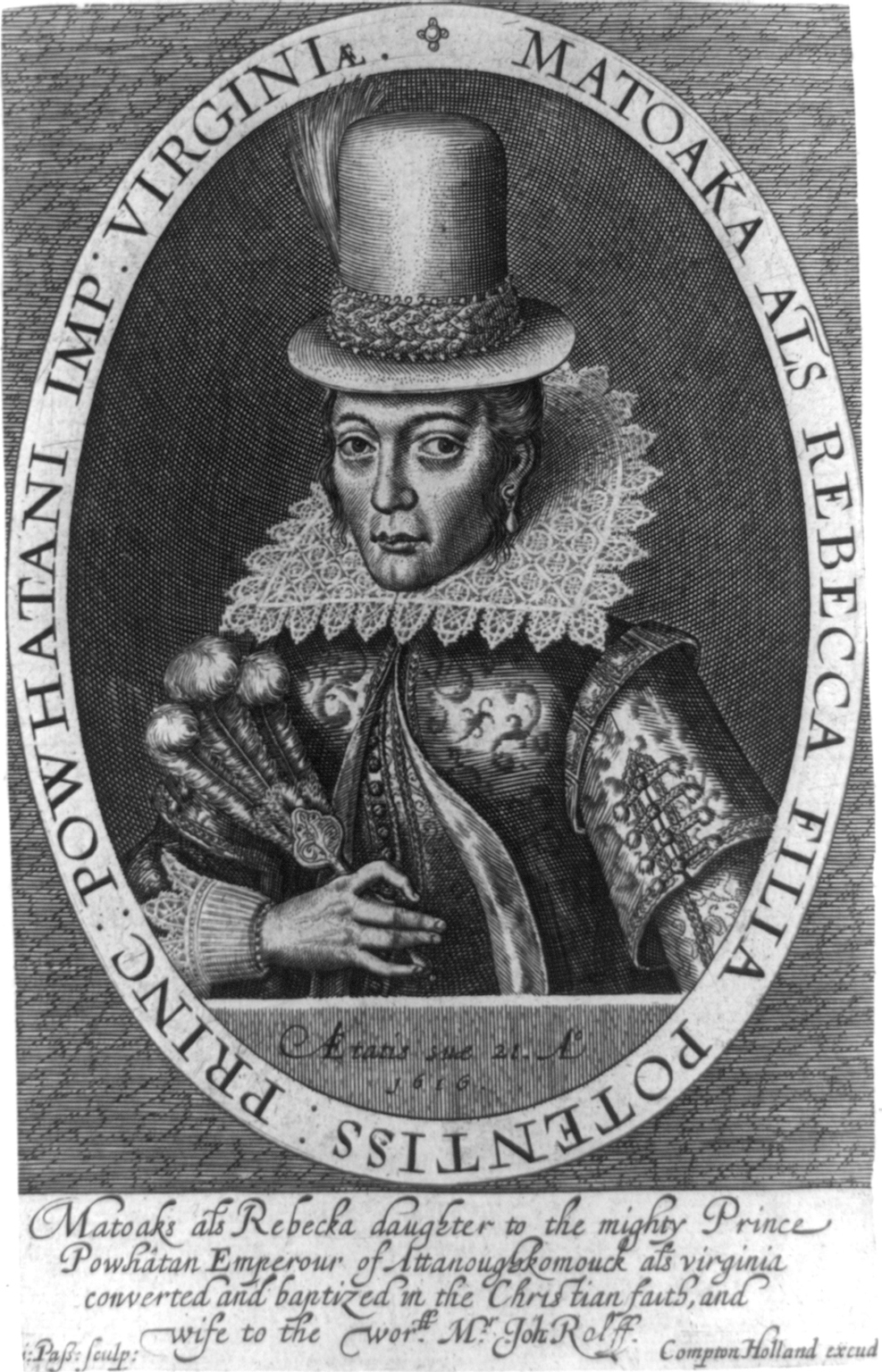
Pocahontas in English garb

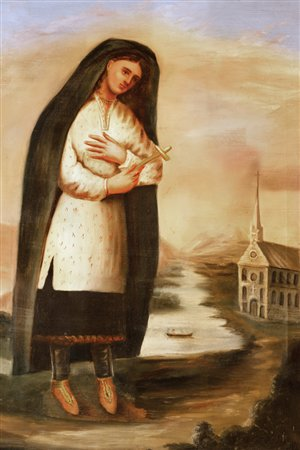
Depiction of Kateri, Lily of the Mohawks

European immigration came with the effect of territorial claims and forcibly removing Native Americans from their land. Some Native American people welcomed these immigrants, sharing their skills and belongings with the newcomers. Yet immigrants took advantage of Native Americans' hospitality and started building their own nation on top of tribal lands, encouraging more and more Europeans to move to North America and build new towns and homes for their people. Aside from violently evicting many American Indians off their land, the Europeans brought novel diseases, which caused a high mortality rate among the tribes and decreased the birth rate of the Native American people. As the number of Europeans grew bigger, the American Indian population decreased and neared extinction.

One of the effects on the Native American women by the onslaught of Europeans was marriage. In many Northeast tribes, native women were used as guides, interpreters, and eventually wives for the fur traders. These marriages appeared to broker an alliance between cultures; however, when the fur traders decided to return to Europe they would abandon their wives, or even pass them on to another trader as property. The children resulting from these unions were not under the control of the mothers, like they were traditionally in Native American society. Instead, many of these children were sent away by their father to obtain a Christian education.

Some colonists sought to convert the native women involved in these relationships into Christians Pocahontas’ story exemplifies the many marriages that brought alliances between tribes and colonists. A portrait of Pocahontas was made depicting a woman in stiff European clothes, stripped of her native identity. Some native women converted to Christianity, most notably Kateri Tekakwitha, Lily of the Mohawks. Tekakwitha was taught Catholicism from mother, who had been baptized by French missionaries. Tekakwitha converted to Catholicism when she was 19, a decision that elicited scorn and harsh treatment from her tribe.

European's sexualization of Native Women and their roles created the "Pocahontas Perplex" coined by academic Rayna Green, that impacts Native Women still today. This ideology represents only three different types of people they can be, one of which is the Squaw. This role has been tied up with an abstract virtue that white men lust after and created a dangerous environment where they are seen as sex objects, thereby excusing violence against Native women then and still today. Before European contact, domestic violence against Native Women was not as prevalent, and what did occur was severely sanctioned. This violence against Native women was shaped by colonization and permits the ongoing violence against them, today.

== Significant figures ==
Some notable women of the time period include:

- Queen Anne of the Pamunkey Native American tribe rose to her position between 1706 and 1715 in the most powerful tribe of the Powhatan Confederacy. She came to power after the death of her aunt and previous tribe leader, Cockacoeske. The European colonists, only having seen the monarchy in their homelands, called her Queen Anne because of her high ranking position. Upon a request from General Berkeley for warriors from her tribe to be added to soldiers ready to stop Bacon's Rebellion, Anne originally denied them this, on the grounds that her people had been being mistreated for decades by the white colonists. After the governor made promises for better treatment and alliances, Anne agreed to supply warriors.
- Pocahontas was the daughter of a well-known Algonquin chief of Powhatan. Pocahontas played a pivotal role in the affairs between the natives and the European colonists. She allegedly saved the life of Englishman John Smith, by almost sacrificing herself to be put to death instead of him. After John Smith returned to England, she married a member of her tribe before being captured in the first Anglo-Powhatan War, where she was kept by the English, taught from the Bible and given a Christian name: Rebecca. She later married John Rolfe and established a time of peace between the Powhatan tribes and the colonists.
- Queen Weetamoo was a chief of the Pocasset Wampanoag tribe, succeeding her father. Weetamoo became skilled in hunting, fishing, and swimming, along with learning the tasks and skills of the other women in her tribe. She married five times, including to the son of Massasoit, who is known for having had the first Thanksgiving with the Pilgrims, and she kept the alliance alive through her marriage. Weetamoo offered her warriors to fight in King Philip's War, and once led a successful attack on the colonists. After King Philip was betrayed and the war came to an end, the colonists violently celebrated their victory by beheading King Phillip and other leaders. Weetamoo tried to escape, fell into the Taunton River, and drowned.
- Nancy Ward, of the Cherokee Wolf Clan in Tennessee, was a significant historical figure known for her title of "Ghighau" or "Beloved Woman" given to her at 18 years old after leading her people to victory after her husband King Fisher went down and turned the tide in the Taliwa Battle of 1755 between the Cherokee and the Creeks. It was said that her entrance into the battle was the turning point that led her people to victory, even with the Cherokee people being outnumbered. The "Beloved Woman" title was the highest honor given to a woman, and the Cherokee held the belief that the Great Spirit used the "Beloved Woman" as a spokesperson to the people. In this role she sat with the Peace Chief and War Chief during council meetings where she would speak out and let her opinions be heard. Nancy Ward held this title for life and played a vital role as the Woman's Council.
- Anne des Cadeaux, of the Natao (French) and Adais (Spanish) tribe of Louisiana, was the first recorded Native American of her tribe documented by the European settlers. Anne was traded into slavery, but later married Jean Baptiste Brevelle, a Parisian-born trader, explorer, and one of the first soldiers garrisoned at Fort St. Jean Baptiste des Natchitoches. Jean so loved Anne that he obtained permission from Commandant Louis Antoine Juchereau de St. Denis to marry her. After the publication of three banns, Jean and Anne were married in the Catholic Church. Unlike many other Native "wives" of that era, her marriage and children were recognized by the Catholic Church and French colonial government, as opposed to being treated as slaves. She earned the respect of the European colonists by learning how to read and write and by being fully initiated into the Catholic Church after learning the precepts of Christianity. Anne and her son's baptisms are among the first entries in the oldest Catholic Registry of Louisiana. Anne is regarded as one of the most well-documented Native American women of early colonial Louisiana.

== References and further reading ==
- Anderson, Gary C. Ethnic cleansing and the Indian: the crime that should haunt America. Norman, OK: University Of Oklahoma Press, 2014.
- Axtell, James. The European and the Indian: essays in the ethnohistory of colonial North America. Oxford: Oxford Univ. Press, 1982.
- Bataille, Gretchen M., and Kathleen Mullen. Sands. American Indian Women Telling Their Lives. University of Nebraska Press, 1984.
- Bataille, Gretchen M., Lisa, Laurie. Native American women: a biographical dictionary. 2nd ed. New York: Routledge. 2001
- Calloway, Colin G. After King Philip's War: Presence and Persistence in Indian New England. Hanover, NH: University Press of New England, 1997.
- Champagne, Duane. Chronology of Native North American history: from pre-Columbian times to the present Detroit, MI: Gale Research, 1994.
- Carpenter, Delores B. Early Encounters – Native Americans and Europeans in New England. East Lansing, MI: Michigan State University Press, 1994.
- Evans, Sara Margaret. Born for liberty: a history of women in America. New York, NY: Free Press Paperbacks published by Simon & Schuster, 1997.
- Graebner, Norman A., Gilbert Courtland. Fite, and Philip L. White. A history of the American people. 2nd ed. Vol. 1. New York, NY: McGraw-Hill Inc., 1970.
- Green, Rayna. Women in American Indian society. New York, NY: Chelsea House Publishers, 1992.
- Green, Raya. Native American Women. The University of Chicago Press, 1980
- Martino-Trutor, Gina M. (2015). "'As Potent a Prince as any Round About Her': Rethinking Weetamoo of the Pocassett and Native Female Leadership in Early America". Journal of Women's History. 27 (3): 37–60. doi:10.1353/jowh.2015.0032. S2CID 142629136.
- Perdue, Theda. Sifters: Native American Women's Lives. Oxford University Press, 2001.
- Plane, Ann Marie. Colonial intimacies: Indian marriage in early New England. Ithaca, NY: Cornell University Press, 2000.
- Wilson, James. The earth shall weep: a history of Native America. New York, NY: Atlantic Monthly Press, 1998.
- Zinn, Howard. A People's History of the United States 1492–Present. New York, NY: HarperCollins Publishers, 2003.
