= Appomattoc =

Historic Native American tribe in Virginia

Appamatuck
Total population
- 400 (1608), estimated Now extinct

Regions with significant populations
- Eastern Virginia

Languages
- Powhatan (historical)

Religion
- Native

Related ethnic groups
- Pamunkey, Patawomeck, Chickahominy, and other Algonquian peoples

The Appomattoc (also spelled Appamatuck, Apamatic, and numerous other variants) were a historic tribe of Virginia Indians speaking an Algonquian language, and residing along the lower Appomattox River, in the area of what is now Petersburg, Colonial Heights, Chesterfield and Dinwiddie Counties in present-day southeast Virginia.

The Appomattoc were affiliated with the estimated 30 tribes of the Powhatan Confederacy, who controlled the area then known as Tenakomakah, present-day Tidewater Virginia. According to William Strachey, the Appomattoc were one of four subtribes within the original inheritance of Chief Powhatan, before he incorporated the other tribes into his Confederacy, and were said to be closely connected with the Powhatan royal line.

== History ==
The Appomattoc first encountered English explorers on May 8, 1607, when a party led by Christopher Newport reached one of their villages at the mouth of the Appomattox River (it was shown as "Mattica" on the 1608 Tindall map). The English recorded that the foremost warrior among the Virginia Indians was bearing a bow and arrow in one hand, and a pipe with tobacco in the other, to signify the choice of war or peace. The English party soon settled some 30–40 miles downstream from there, on Jamestown Island.

On May 26, Newport led a second party of 24 English colonists to Mattica. They were welcomed with food and tobacco. He noted the village was surrounded by cornfields, which the Indians cultivated. A weroansqua (female chieftain), Oppussoquionuske, led the village. Despite welcoming the colonists, some Appomattoc warriors took part in the sporadic raids on their fort until June 13, after which the Powhatan called a ceasefire. John Smith saw the weroansqua of Appomattoc again at Werowocomoco (the main residence of Chief Powhatan) during his capture in December 1607, where she was appointed to wash his hands; as well as on another expedition to Werowocomoco in February 1608, when Powhatan commanded her to serve him water, turkey and flatbread.

Desperate for corn, Smith and Ralph Waldo visited the Appomattoc village in late fall 1608, and bought corn in exchange for copper. Smith reported in this year that the tribe had 60 warriors (some historians estimated the total population might be 220 based on that.) Their larger village nearby on the north bank of Wighwhippoc Creek, now called Swift Creek, was ruled by the weroance Coquonasum, brother of Oppussoquionuske.

Anglo-Native relations deteriorated in 1609, culminating in the First Anglo-Powhatan War by 1610. Around Christmas 1611, in reprisal for an Appomattoc ambush on a group of English colonists a year before, Sir Thomas Dale seized Oppussoquionuske's village and the surrounding cultivated land. He renamed it "New Bermudas" (the settlement was incorporated in 1614 as the town of Bermuda Hundred).

Following the resumption of hostilities in 1622, the colonists, led by Captain Nathaniel West, destroyed Coquonasum's village and drove off the residents in August 1623. The remnants of the tribe moved their settlement farther up Swift Creek, and slightly southward to Old Town Creek in present-day Colonial Heights, Virginia. Colonists attacked them again in 1627.

In 1635 the Appomattoc were driven from the upper Swift Creek Valley by Captain Henry Fleet. He had spent four years with Indians at Nacotchtank, the present site of Washington DC, and spoke Algonquian Powhatan fluently. Fleet built a small fort on the large hill overlooking the falls on the north bank. The site is now occupied by the campus of Virginia State University in Ettrick.

After the Powhatan Confederacy was finally defeated by the English during the second major Anglo-Powhatan War (1644–46), the Confederacy was dissolved, and all the subtribes, including the Appomattoc, individually became tributary to the King of England, rather than to the former Pamunkey Emperor. The Appomattoc by then were located mainly at Ronhorak (or Rohowicke; modern Rohoic Creek, running near the modern border between Petersburg and Dinwiddie) and Matoks, on the opposite bank north of the Appomattox (now Randolph Farm at VSU). This was at the northern end of the "Occaneechi Trail", a long-used Native American trail that ran all the way to South Carolina.

In 1645, the Virginia Colony built Fort Henry at the falls, a short distance east of Ronhorak. Following the treaty of 1646, and until 1691, this fort marked the legal frontier of white settlement, which ran in a straight line from the "head of Yapin" (modern Franklin, Virginia) to the Monacan town on the James River (west of where Richmond is now). The Appomattoc and other southern Powhatan tribes (Weyanoke, Nansemond) were thus separated from the more northerly ones by a substantial enclave of English settlement. During all those years, Fort Henry was to be the only point in Virginia at which the Indians could be authorized to cross eastward into white territory, or whites westward into Indian territory. At first the Virginia Indians had to wear a badge made of striped cloth while in white territory to show they were authorized, or they could be murdered on the spot. In 1662, this law was changed to require them to display a copper badge or else be subject to arrest. In the early 20th century, such a 17th-century copper badge, inscribed with "Appomattock", was excavated in eastern Dinwiddie County.

Fort Henry also served as a starting point for subsequent English westward exploration. In 1650, an Appomattoc guide called Pyancha took a party led by Abraham Wood beyond the headwaters of the river. In 1671, their weroance Peracuta led Thomas Batts and Robert Fallam on an expedition within the borders of present-day West Virginia. A 1669 census shows that the Appomattoc had 50 bowmen around this time, which means their total population may have been about 150.

Although beyond the allowed treaty limits, Batts in 1674 patented land just west of Matoks. Settlers destroyed the Appomattoc village during Bacon's Rebellion in 1676. The nearby Matoaca, Virginia was named after the native village. Peracuta and his tribe were excluded from the 1677 Treaty of Middle Plantation. He was among those who signed the 1680 addendum to the treaty. Wood patented land at Ronhorak in 1680, indicating some further retreat of the Appomattoc from their lands.

Although the colony had prohibited Indian slavery by law, Nathaniel Bacon re-introduced the practice in 1676. It was violently opposed by the Indians and caused much suffering to the people. Tribes raided their enemies to sell captives as slaves to the colonists in Virginia and further north. But, the colonial legislature took 15 years until it abolished Indian slavery in 1691.

As the Appomattoc population began to dwindle, the people were vulnerable to attack from traditional western enemy tribes. On April 24, 1691, the weroansqua who succeeded Peracuta petitioned the colony for permission for her people to live among the English colonists for protection. In 1705, Robert Beverley, Jr. noted that the Appomattoc consisted of no more than seven families, living on the pasture of William Byrd II at Westover Plantation. This was the last known mention of them as a distinct tribe in historic records and they were estimated to be extinct by 1722. Their descendants likely assimilated into Virginia colonial society or merged with other tribes.

The names "Appomattox" and "Mattox" were sometimes applied to the Matchotic, a Virginia Indian group made up of the Onawmanient and other remnant tribes of the Powhatan Confederacy, but located principally in the Northern Neck region between the Potomac and Rappahannock rivers. There were historic villages named Matchotic in Northumberland and King George's counties.
