= Abraham Wood =

Colonial Virginia settler and politician (1610-1682)

Member of the Virginia Governor's Council
- In office 1657–1680

Member of the Virginia House of Burgesses representing Charles City County
- In office 1654–1656 Serving with Stephen Hamlin, Edward Hill, John Holmwood, Henry Perry, Daniel Llewellin, Anthony Wyatt
- Preceded by: John Bushopp
- Succeeded by: Robert Wynne
- In office 1652–1653 Serving with David Llewellin, Henry Perry, Charles Sparrow, John Woodliffe
- Preceded by: John Bushopp
- Succeeded by: John Bushopp

Member of the Virginia House of Burgesses representing Henrico County
- In office October 1644 – 1647 Serving with John Baugh, Richard Cocke, William Cocke, William Hatcher, Daniel Luellin
- Preceded by: Mathew Gough
- Succeeded by: Thomas Harris

Personal details
- Born: 1610 England
- Died: circa 1682 Charles City County (now Petersburg), Colony of Virginia
- Citizenship: Kingdom of Great Britain
- Occupation: trader, explorer, militia officer, politician

Abraham Wood (1610–1682, sometimes referred to as "General" or "Colonel" Wood), was an English fur trader, militia officer, politician and explorer of 17th century colonial Virginia. Wood helped build and maintained Fort Henry at the falls of the Appomattox in present-day Petersburg. An expedition he commissioned reached the Eastern Continental divide at what is now the New River and that body of water was called Wood River for many years before it was subsequently labeled the "New." He also served in the Virginia House of Burgesses and as a member of the Virginia Governor's Council.

== Early life ==
Abraham Wood emigrated from England as a 10-year-old boy in 1620. The English ship Margaret and John, on which he sailed as an indentured servant or cabin boy, was attacked by two Spanish vessels in the West Indies; Wood was one of the few survivors; the attack led the vessel to turn to the Virginia colonies. His location during the Indian Massacres of 1622 is unknown, but clearly he survived.

== Career ==
By 1625, Wood worked for Captain Samuel Mathews (as the youngest of his indentured servants) and lived at Jamestown. He was still in James City in 1632, but soon leased 100 acres along Kennecock Creek in one of the plantations upstream on the James River owned by descendants of Gov. Thomas Dale. By the end of the decade Wood filed several land claims for areas on the lower Appomattox River. In 1638 Wood received a land grant for 400 acres on the Appomattox River in Charles City County in what had been Flowerdew Hundred but had been renamed Peirsey's Hundred. In 1639 Wood patented another 200 acres based on paying the emigration of four named men from Britain.

By this time Wood had turned to exploring the colony's interior and traded for the beaver and deerskin with the indigenous peoples. Upon being expelled from their villages at Bermuda Hundred and Swift Creek, natives had established a village near the falls of the Appomattox River, which would much later would become part of Petersburg. After a dozen years of relative peace, natives revolted in 1644, in what is sometimes known as the third Anglo-Powhatan War. Governor William Berkeley the following summer led militia to the village of the aging Opechancanough (who had led the 1622 uprising), imprisoned him at Jamestown (where he died) and deported all males in that village older than 11 to Tangier Island.

Virginia colonists also responded to the unrest by building Fort Henry in 1646 at the falls of the Appomattox River. According to the treaty which ended that part of the conflict, it supposedly marked the legal frontier between white settlers and Native Americans, as well as defended the settlers on the south side of the James River (about 20 miles north of the Appomattox River). The fort also provided protection for the native Appomattoc tribe which had grain fields and fished in the Appomattox River near the falls, with whom Wood traded. From 1646 until around 1691, it became the only point in Virginia where Native Americans from south of the James River could legally cross eastward into white territory, or whites westward into Native American territory. Soon after its construction, Wood commanded a garrison of 30 from the surrounding counties. Colonists thought the tax burden too great, so the government allowed the fort and 600 acres of land to be sold to Wood, who agreed to keep 10 armed men at the fort for three years. Thus Wood, both commanded the fort and privately owned the adjoining land and trading post, a considerable advantage over his competitors in the "Indian trade".

Wood's increasing social standing was also shown by his election to the House of Burgesses in October 1644 by voters from Henrico County, and he won re-election three times (unlike any of his colleagues) as the number of burgesses representing that growing county varied greatly. However, Henrico's representation declined to just Thomas Harris in the 1647/8 session, and William Hatcher in the 1649 and 1652 sessions (and no-one in the 1651-1652 session), possibly because Wood was leading additional explorations of the upper reaches of the James River and down to the Roanoke River, as described below. Wood re-appeared as a burgess in the second session of 1652, now representing Charles City County, and he won-re-election for most of the sessions through 1656. Wood had become a justice of the peace for Charles City County in 1655 (the justices jointly administering the colony in that era). Also in 1655, he was appointed to a committee to review Virginia's laws. He was appointed to the Virginia Governor's Council in 1657 (the highest office to which a colonist could aspire in that era) and actively served until at least 1671. According to correspondence, he kept his seat through at least 1676, probably 1680.

Wood dispatched several exploration parties from Fort Henry during these years, including one that he personally led in 1650, which explored the upper reaches of the James River and the Roanoke River to the south. In August 1650, Wood and Edward Bland reached and traveled on the Great Indian Warpath, penetrating the Carolina region southwest of the Roanoke River and discovering westward flowing rivers. Daniel Coxe mentions that "Parts of this Country were discovered by the English long before the French had the least knowledge... Colonel Wood of Virginia... from the years 1654 to 1664 discovered at several times several branches of the great rivers Ohio and Mesechaceba (unknown current name)."

In 1671 Wood commissioned the first English expeditions to cross the Eastern Continental Divide. The members of that expedition included Thomas Wood (possibly a brother or son), Thomas Batts (Batte) and Robert Fallamto. The expedition is now known as the Batts and Fallam Expedition. The exploration party eventually reached what is now the New River Valley and the New River. Batts was a grandson of Robert Batts, vicar master of University College, Oxford, and possible relation to Nathaniel Batts, first permanent settler in North Carolina and Governor of Roanoke Island. Nathaniel by 1655 had a busy Indian trade from his home on Albemarle Sound. Robert Fallam kept a journal of their journey which shows him literate and educated. The New River was named Wood's River after Abraham Wood, although in time it became better known as the New River. Batts and Fallam are generally credited with being the first Europeans to enter within the present-day borders of West Virginia.

In 1673 Wood sent his friend James Needham and his indentured servant Gabriel Arthur on an expedition to find an outlet to the Pacific Ocean. Shortly after their departure Needham and Arthur encountered a group of Tomahitan Native Americans, who offered to conduct the men to their town across the mountains. After reaching the Tomahitan town, Needham returned to Fort Henry to report to Wood. While en route back to the Tomahitan town Needham was killed by a member of the trading party with whom he was traveling. Shortly thereafter, Arthur was almost killed by a mob in the Tomahitan settlement but was saved and then adopted by the town's headman. Arthur lived with the Tomahitans for almost a year, accompanying them on war and trading expeditions as far south as Spanish Florida and as far north as the Ohio River.

Wood was appointed colonel of a militia regiment in Henrico and Charles City counties in 1655. Later, he was appointed major general but lost this position in 1676 after Bacon's Rebellion either because of infirmity or political differences with Governor William Berkeley. Bacon's rebel forces attacked the Appomattoc Indians on both sides of the river, killed many and dispersed the rest, after burning their town.

By 1670 Wood had relinquished his trading post to his son-in-law, Peter Jones (the first of three related men of the same name, for whom Petersburg, Virginia would eventually be named). Peter Jones had commanded an infantry company under Wood in 1661, and in 1675 Jones became commander of the reactivated fort. Jones had married Wood's daughter Margaret, and a map drafted in 1670 named what had been "Fort Henry" on earlier maps, simply "Wood". Wood retired to patent more plantation land in 1680 west of the fort, in what had been Appomattoc territory, notwithstanding such acquisitions formally being disallowed by the House of Burgesses.

== Personal life ==
Wood married twice, but may have outlived all but one daughter, whom he named in his last will and testament by her married name, Mary Chamberlain. His first wife may have been named Elizabeth and also bore a son, Abraham Wood Jr., who died decades before his father. His second wife was a widow who had children by her first marriage, although her name is controversial. Some consider her the widow of Henrico County fur trader James Crewes, who was executed for his role in Bacon's Rebellion, but who managed to leave property to a son and a daughter (but no wife/prospective widow was named).

In any event, the major beneficiaries of this man's will were children of his step-daughter Margaret, who had married Peter Jones as her first husband, and after her death Thomas Cocke. Margaret survived both husbands and her will was proven in 1719. Margaret had first married Peter Jones (the earliest documentary evidence as whom dates to 1655). Although a Peter and William Jones were indentured servants who emigrated to Virginia aboard the Southampton in 1623, they are unlikely to be the same man since both were older than the boy Abraham Wood. The stepson Peter Jones is more likely to have been a man mustered by Abraham Peirsey more than a decade later. That Peter Jones was Wood's second in command of Wood's militia company according to two documents from 1657, and was one of several named captains under Col. Wood in 1661,

Although Charles City County records are lost for the intervening period, Peter Wood commanded Fort Henry for Wood by 1674. Peter Jones had died by 1687, when Margaret married Thomas Cocke of Malvern Hill in Henrico County, who died by April 1697.

Margaret and Jones had two sons, Abraham (who was a militia lieutenant in 1683 but died by 1690, thus before his long-lived mother, but married and had a son named Peter) and Peter (who became his mother's executor alongside William Randolph). Her daughter married Major Joshua Wynne and had children.

Margaret's will made several bequests of mulatto children to her grandchildren and to Mrs. Mary Randolph. The son Peter Jones may have had sons named Abraham and Cadwallader Jones (who lived in Williamsburg). Grandson Peter Jones married his cousin Mary (the daughter of son Peter Jones and his wife Mary Batte who died in Dinwiddie county in 1734). He lived in Henrico County and later Bristol Parish of Prince George County (which was created from Charles City County south of the James River), and participated in many real estate transactions. The Peter Jones (II) will admitted to probate in 1726 gives a life estate in his widow, and names five sons and three daughters, and makes Peter Jones (III) and Robert Mumford executors (including many bequests of enslaved people).

The eldest son was Abraham (who became a tobacco viewer for Bristol Parish with his father and had a son named Thomas who inherited the old trading post in what had become Petersburg) as well as another Peter, William, John and Wood. The will also mentions his son-in-law Peter Jones (daughter) Mary's husband.

== Death and legacy ==
Abraham Wood died some time between 1681 and 1686, possibly in 1682. Further westward explorations stalled until undertaken by Lieutenant Governor Alexander Spottswood.
