= Opossunoquonuske =

17th-century Algonquian leader

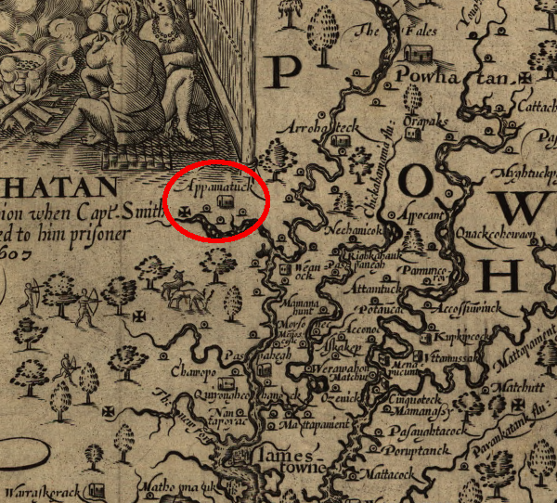
- Born: unknown (fl. 1607)
- Disappeared: 1610
- Other name: Oppussoquionuske or Opposunoquonuske
- Family: Opechancanough (brother)

Opossunoquonuske (variant forms: Oppussoquionuske or Opposunoquonuske) (fl. 1607–1610) was a Weroansqua of an Appomattoc town near the mouth of the Appomattox River. Weroansqua (or Weroance) is an Algonquian word meaning leader or commander among the Powhatan confederacy of Virginia coast and Chesapeake Bay region. She was known as the queen of Appamatuck. The community she led was large enough to provide an estimated twenty warriors to the Powhatan Confederacy.

Native women leaders appear in numerous colonial records, and Opossunoquonuske is among that list. Just as Hernando de Soto met a woman he called the Lady of Cofitachequi, John Smith mentions Opossunoquonuske, “Queen of Appomattoc”. Even as colonization curtailed more direct forms of political and military leadership for women, later records attest to the ways in which many Native women maintained sociocultural authority.

== Early descriptions ==
Various English settlers gave the first recorded descriptions of Opossunoquonuske. Captain John Smith described her as “young and comely". According to historian Helen Rountree, Captain Christopher Newport gave one of the fullest descriptions of her. Newport was an English privateer and ship captain who helped to establish the first English colony in North America at Jamestown in 1607. According to Newport, in May of 1607, when Newport, Smith, and an exploring party sailed upriver from Jamestown, the “Queene of Apamatuck kindely entreated” them to visit “her people”. He wrote of her as a woman whose name was Opossunoquonuske, was the sister of Coquonasum, the king or werowance of Appomattoc, a town under Powhatan’s dominion. Opossunoquonuske’s kinship ties entitled her to rule in her own right.

Historians Helen Rountree and Gina M. Martino argue the Powhatan people may have met the Englishmen earlier when they visited a place called Arrohattoc, about five miles from Appomattoc. The Native ruler there, whom the English described as the Icing, “most kindely entertained” described Opossunoquske as making a majestic entrance with her attendants. She was dignified and dressed more elegantly than anyone else, she wore a copper crown, and other copper jewelry adorned her ears and encircled her neck. Her long black hair hung down to the middle of her back. She would "permitt none to stand or sitt neere her".

People who came in contact with her highlighted her bravery. Gabriel Archer, an early explorer who settled in Jamestown, wrote of Oppossunoquonuske as "a fatt lustie manly woman" after meeting her in 1607. Arriving outlanders had shot off their guns, and while nothing in the Powhatan world sounded quite like gunpowder, according to Archer, Oppsunoquonsque “did not flinch at the sound”.

== Incident in winter of 1610 ==
Opossunoquonuske invited a party of fourteen Englishmen to “feast and make merry” in her village. According to Virginian colonist William Strachey, she persuaded them to leave their weapons in their boat with feminine guile, claiming that “their [the Indian] women would be afrayd ells [else] of their pieces [weapons]”.^{[1]} Historians Thomas H. Appleton and Helen Rountree suggest that Opossunoquonuske deliberately played upon gendered expectations, divesting the Englishmen of their weapons. After all, Opossunoquonuske had previously asked to see English guns fired and had watched with interest, not fear.

Opossunoquonuske served a feast, probably of venison or turkey, to her unsuspecting guests. Then, she ordered them killed. Only the “taborer” (drummer), Thomas Dowse, escaped by holding the boat’s rudder as a shield and sculling the boat out of arrowshot range.

In retaliation, the English burned the town and killed several of its inhabitants. She was wounded as she fled into the woods, and may have died of her wounds for she does not reappear in the records after that. Another boat carrying the governor himself managed to reach the falls of the James River (in the autumn of 1610), where the foreigners built and occupied a fort for a while in spite of the local people’s ferocious response, which killed many intruders. The intruders returned the favor, destroying many houses in Powhatan town. By 1613, Bermuda Hundred, Virginia, had been established at the town site. John Smith, in his narrative of the Virginia Colony, discussed the burning of the town but not the reason behind it, calling the motive only the "injurie done us by them of Apomatock”.

As Gina Martino argues: "Opposing or killing such female leaders as Opossunoquonuske reflected an inherent acknowledgment of her position as rightful rulers and formidable foes. The careers of such female sachems as Opossunoquonuske of the Appomattoc, the 'Queene' of the Massachusett, Matantuck of the Narragansett, and Weetamoo of the Pocasset demonstrate both the social space available for female sachems in Native nations and the widespread colonial recognition of their rank and right to rule regardless of whether that rule supported colonial objectives." According to Helen Rountree, when the satellite town at their river’s mouth was burned, Opossunoquonuske, its weroansqua, was wounded.

== Family history and tribal background ==
After her death, Opossunoquonuske’s brother, Opechancanough, became leader of the Powhatan Confederacy in present-day Virginia from 1618 until his death in 1646. Opechancanough inherited the position from his cousin, Powhatan/Wahunsonacock, under whose leadership the Confederacy had considerably expanded through war and marriage. Opossunoquske and her brother were both tribal members of the Powhatan Confederacy (c. 1570-1677). The Powhatan Confederacy was a political, social, and martial entity of over 30 Algonquian-speaking Native American tribes of the region of modern-day Virginia, Maryland, and part of North Carolina, USA.

Opechancanough led the Powhatan in the Second (1622-1626) and Third (1644-1646) Anglo-Powhatan Wars. He began the second war with a coordinated attack on English settlements known as the Indian massacre of 1622. These wars marked a high point of Algonquian resistance to English colonization. In 1646, Opechancanough was captured by English colonists and taken to Jamestown, where he was killed by a settler assigned to guard him.

== The London Company ==
The London Company, officially known as the Virginia Company of London, was a division of the Virginia Company with responsibility for colonizing the east coast of North America, concurred the documents of Gabriel Archer, an explorer who was the appointed the official note taker of this trip. Historian Helen Rountree and Thomas Appleton explain that this trip had specific instructions from the London Company; “They were to establish trade with the Native people, whom they considered savages, while encouraging them to abandon their traditional ways and become Christians.” Connecting this to Opossunoquonuske, exploring encountered the Arrohattoc Tribe also known as the Powhatan, as the explorers believed it to be the name of the town because of an Aboriginal leader named Powhatan ruled some thirty tribes. The land was surrounded by fields of tobacco corn, beans, and gourds. The local tribes told the explorers about a large body of water just beyond the mountains and they set sail they believed the mountains were full of gold, Archer noted that they saw “the queen of this country” and noted: “She is a fat, lusty, manly women.” As the Englishmen departed, Opossunoquonuske suggested that they stop down the river to meet one of her brothers, a werowance name Opechancanough. There are claims that while the early English documentary sources clearly indicate that Opossunoquonuske’s village was on the north side of the Appomattox River, the presence of considerable Late Woodland material at the City Point itself suggests that a village may have been present on the bluff prior to English exploration. Opossunoquonuske, may have observed or heard of the hospitality and may have wanted to establish her own relations with the newcomers. Her queenly bearing impressed the English visitors. As Archer noted, they saw her “comminge in the same fashion of state as Powhatan or Arrohattoc, yea rather with more Majesty”.
