= Thomas Batts =

English explorer and settler in Virginia

Thomas Batts was an early settler in Virginia and an explorer of western Virginia.

== Early and family life ==
Coat of Arms of Thomas Batt

Thomas Batts (also Batte) was born in Yorkshire, England, 1661, and was a son of John Batte of Oakwell Hall and Martha Mallory, daughter of Thomas Mallory, Doctor in Divinity and Deane of Chester. The Visitation of Yorkshire by William Dugdale, Esq. dated April 2, 1666 notes on his chart that "Henry and William, brothers of Captain John Batte, settled in Virginia, and that Thomas and Henry Batte, sons of Captain John Batte, were now in Virginia" in 1666. On April 29, 1666, a grant for land in Charles City County, Virginia was issued to “Thomas Batts and Henry Batts sons of Mr. John Batts dec’d” for 5,878 acres, which land description references the James River in Appomatock, “the said land being due by and for the transportation of 118 persons into the Colony”. This land was later located in Prince George County, Virginia when it was formed in 1703.

Thomas was a Justice of the Peace for Henrico County in 1683 and 1684. A Thomas Batt was a Burgess (county unknown) in 1701. Thomas Batte last appears in the records of Henrico County, Virginia in 1700 and must have died in 1701 or shortly thereafter, but certainly was dead by January 1, 1713, when his daughter Martha Cocke, adm. of John Banister dec'd, for amounts paid to her "by my late father, Thomas Batts of Henrico County, quitclaim to Richard Jones of Prince George County," certain slaves. On June 1, 1689, "Thomas Batte the elder" had made over to John Banister, Clerk, certain slaves. Thomas Batte's daughter Martha Batte married first Abraham Wood Jones; second John Banister; and third Stephen Cocke. No probate or estate records exist for Thomas, but he is known to have had a son Thomas Batte Jr. that died in 1691 in Henrico County and daughters Ann, Martha and Mary.

=== Land records ===
Thomas Batts and Abraham Wood (sponsor of the Batts-Fallam expedition in 1671 and Needham-Arthur expedition in 1673) were adjoining land owners as evidenced by a July 10, 1680 land grant to Maj. General Abraham Wood for 1,304 acres in Charles City County, Bristol Parish, for land on "the southside of the run of Appomattox River…& near the Indian town creek…opposite the lands of Mr. Thomas Batts."

Thomas Batte appears in a number of Henrico County records with William Byrd I, a well-connected fur trader and competitor of Abraham Wood. "Thomas Battes" appears with William Byrd as early as 1673 when he witnesses a transaction between William Byrd and Thomas Harris. On April 8, 1674, "Thomas Batts" patented a tract of 1,862 acres "on the North side of Appamattox River adjoining his own land above ye falls of ye Appamattuck Indian Towne to ye Old Towne Creek." A portion of this patent was later sold when 100 acres were sold by Thomas Batte Sr. of Appamattuck in Henrico County, Gent. and his wife Mary to Gabriel Arther, planter, on September 13, 1684. On December 1, 1686, "Gabriell Arther" sold this same 100 acre parcel to Hon. William Byrd, Esq. On this same date, Thomas Batte Sr. and Thomas Batte Jr. sold approximately 1,100 acres (deed is ambiguous on this) of Thomas Batts' 1674 patent to William Byrd, Esq.

== Exploration ==
=== Batts and Fallam expedition ===
On September 1, 1671, Thomas Batts (Thomas Batte), Thomas Wood, and Robert Fallam (Robert Hallom) set out from Appomattox Town (located near present-day Petersburg, Virginia), "accompanied with Peracuta, a great man of the Apomatock Indians, and Jack Nesan, formerly servant to Ma.-Gen. Wood, with five horses." They were acting under a commission granted to Abraham Wood and authorized by the Virginia House of Burgesses "for finding out the ebbing and flowing of the water behind the mountains, in order to the discovery of the South Sea" (Note: The term "South Sea" historically referred to the Pacific Ocean, named by early European explorers such as Vasco Núñez de Balboa. It should not be confused with the Gulf of Mexico.) The Batts and Fallam group is credited with discovering Woods River, now called the New River. Thomas Wood died during the expedition.

The Batts-Fallam Journal records that on September 17, 1671, "the Indians being impatient of longer stay, they proclaimed King Chas. the Second, and marked four trees, the first, C. R., for his Majesty, the second, W. B. William Berkeley, for the Governor, the third, A. W., for Maj.-Gen. Abraham Wood, and the last, T. B., R. F., for themselves, and P. for Peracuta, who said he would be an Englishman, and on another tree are letters for the rest".

The expedition returned to Fort Henry on Oct. 1.

==== The History and Present State of Virginia, in Four Parts ====
The History and Present State of Virginia, in Four Parts published in 1705 and written by Robert Beverly (coincidentally, son-in-law of William Byrd I, stated elsewhere herein) states that William Berkeley "was also resolv'd to make new Discoveries abroad amongst the Indians" and "For this End he employ'd a small Company of about Fourteen English, and as many Indians, under the Command of Captain Henry Batt, to go upon such an Adventure." and "they set out together from Appamattox". He states that the "Indians which Capt. Batt had with him, made a Halt, and would positively proceed no further. They said, that not far off from that Place, lived a Nation of Indians, that made Salt, and sold it to their Neighbours. That this was a great and powerful People, which never suffer'd any Strangers to return, that had once discover'd their Towns. Capt. Batt used all the Arguments he could to get them forward, but in vain. And so, to please those timorous Indians, the Hopes of this Discovery were frustrated, and the Detachment was forced to return." The publication references Capt. Batt numerous times, but only refers to Captain Henry Batt once. It is not known if the reference to Henry Batt was a misprint or a reference to an expedition other than the Thomas Batts and Robert Fallom expedition.

==== French and Indian War ====
In 1763, in negotiations following the French and Indian War, the Batts and Fallam exploration was used in treaty negotiations to bolster England’s claim to the Ohio Valley.

=== Needham and Arthur expedition ===
After the 1671 Batts and Fallam expedition, a subsequent expedition also sponsored by Abraham Wood was made by James Needham and Gabriel Arthur. The historical account of the expedition is contained in a letter from Abraham Wood to John Richards August 22, 1674.The expedition references "discoveries to the South or West sea in two years, which he was made sensible of by the hands of Thos. Batt (Thomas Batts) and Robert Fallam" and consisted of the two Englishmen and eight Indians sent out about 10 April 1673 to make discoveries across the mountains. James Needham was killed by his Indian guide early in the expedition. Arthur Gabriel went on to explore lands as far south as the western coast of Florida on the Gulf of Mexico. On the return trip he traveled west to the Mississippi River, went upriver to the Ohio, and up the Ohio to the mouth of Big Sandy River in Kentucky. He visited numerous Shawnee villages along the lower Ohio River, and is credited with being the first whiteman to visit Kentucky, and may have been the first person to navigate the Ohio River. He returned to Fort Henry on June 18, 1674.
