= Queen Betty =

Betty

Pamunkey leader
- Preceded by: Cockacoeske
- Succeeded by: Ann

Betty, also known as Mrs Betty and Queen Betty, is believed to have been the name of the niece of Cockacoeske who succeeded her as weroansqua or chief of the Pamunkey tribe, a Native American tribe of Virginia, in the late 1600s to early 1700s.

== History ==
On 1 July 1686, the Council of Virginia was informed of the death of Cockacoeske, ruler of the Pamunkey for 30 years:

George Smith Interpreter to ye Pomunkey [Pamunkey] Indians having this day informed his Excellency and Councel, that ye Pomunkey Indian Queen, so called, was lately dead, and that ye Pomunkey Indians did desire, that ye late Queenes Niece -- upon whom ye right of Government of that Indian Nation does devolve, might succeed in ye Governm't whereupon It is ordered, that ye said Geo. Smith doe acquaint ye said late Queens Niece and ye Great men of Pomunkey Town to attend his Excellency, att James Citty, on ye third day of ye next General Court, in order to her being confirmed in ye Governm't of those Indians.

Though the new ruler is described as Cockakoeske's niece, her name is not given. The name "Ms. Betty Queen ye Queen" appears in a land transaction of 1702, and by 1708 "Queen Ann" is mentioned.

The Dictionary of Virginia Biography suggests that Betty and Ann may have been the same person:

Sparse documentation and the Powhatan Indians' practice of changing their names on important occasions have led to confusion in identifying the principal leaders of the Pamunkey. It has been conjectured that the niece who succeeded Cockacoeske, Mrs. Betty, and Ann were the same woman and that she changed her name to Ann after Queen Anne ascended the English throne in 1702.

| Preceded by Cockacoeske | Weroansqua of the Pamunkey; 1686–1708 | Succeeded by Ann |
