= Thomas Dowse =

American politician

Thomas Dowse, also known as Thomas Dawse and Thomas Dawles (will read, June 4, 1683) was an English-American immigrant who represented City of Henricus in the first meeting of the House of Burgesses on July 30, 1619 at Jamestown, Virginia.

== Biography ==
Dowse was born in England, but migrated to the American colonies, becoming one of the "ancient planters".

Brown states in his "First Republic in America," that, in 1619, "the City of Henricus included Henrico (Farrar's Island), extending thence on both sides of James River to the westward, the pale run by Dale between the said river and the Appomattox River being the line on the South Side." It was represented in the House of Burgesses by Thomas Dowse and John Pollington sometimes shown as John Polentine. Henrico having been selected as the site for a college and university, the first college in America, ten thousand acres (40 km²) were set by, as agreed, and the limits of the corporation were extended from the Falls of the James on the Popham side to what is now called Farrar's Island.

Dowse was the only survivor of the attack launched by Opossunoquonuske and her Appomattoc warriors against a retaliatory attack from the Jamestown settlement in 1610. Dowse played a tabor (instrument) and danced to lure the natives from cover. He protected himself by using the rudder of the men's boat as a shield. The English destroyed the Indians' village in retaliation for the massacre.
