= Fort Henry (Virginia) =

17th century fort in Virginia, USA

- Location within Virginia
- 37°13′31″N 77°24′57″W
- Location: Petersburg, Virginia, United States

History
- Built: 1645

The first Fort Henry in the Virginia colony was a small facility, with a garrison of 15, that was erected in 1611 by Thomas West, 3rd Baron De La Warr as part of a series of fortifications now located in Hampton. Due to continually humid conditions and Atlantic storms, this timber fort was defunct by the time the fort on the Appomattox was built.

The later Fort Henry was an English frontier fort near the falls of the Appomattox River. Its exact location has been debated, but the most popular one (marked by Virginia Historical Marker QA-6) is on a bluff about four blocks north of the corner of W. Washington and N. South Streets in Petersburg.

Fort Henry was built in 1645 by order of Virginia's House of Burgesses. It marked the 1646 treaty frontier between the white settlers and the Indians following the Second Anglo-Powhatan War. It was situated at the fall line of the Piedmont, near the Appomattoc Indian tribe. From 1646 until around 1691, it was the only point in Virginia where Indians could be authorized to cross eastward into white territory, or whites westward into Indian territory. In later years it also came to be known as Fort Wood, after its first commander, Abraham Wood (1614–82). He used the fort as a base for several exploratory expeditions of the region. In 1675, command of the fort and adjacent Indian trading post passed to Wood's son-in-law, Peter Jones. The post became known as "Peter's Point". With trade and related settlement, eventually the city of Petersburg developed here. At some unknown point the original fort fell into ruins.
