= Oholasc =

17th-century Native American leader

Ohalasc (c. 1570s – c. 1620s) was a Native American woman who served as Weroansqua (female chief) of the Quiyoughcohannock tribe of the Powhatan Confederacy. She has also been referred to as "Queen of the Quiyoughcohannock" and "Queen Ohalasc."

== Life ==
Ohalasc was one of the many wives of Chief Powhatan, and they had at least one child together, Tahacoope, in the 1590s.

In the early 1600s, she was named as the new Weroansqua (female chief) and regent of the Quiyoughcohannock tribe, succeeding Pepiscumah (who had been deposed by Chief Powhatan). The tribe was located across several villages along the James River east of the Weanock. At the time of Ohalasc's reign, the tribe had approximately 200 tribal members (including approximately 60 warriors).

She was succeeded as chief of the tribe by her son, Tahacoope.
