= Queen Ann (Pamunkey chief) =

Pamunkey ruler

- Born: unknown
- Died: c. 1723
- Occupation: Weroansqua (Ruler)
- Years active: 1706–1718
- Known for: Fought for the rights of the Pamunkey
- Predecessor: Queen Betty

Queen Ann (c. 1650–1723) appears in Virginia records between 1706 and 1718 as weroansqua of the Pamunkey tribe of Virginia. Ann continued her predecessors' efforts to keep peace with the colony of Virginia.

She became the leader of her tribe after Queen Betty, in 1708 or before. Queen Ann is first mentioned in 1708. Prior to that the Weroansqua of the Pamunkey was Queen Betty who succeeded her aunt Cockacoeske in 1686. Cockacoeske, Betty, and Anne are often confused with each other. It is certain that Cockacoeske was not the same as Anne; Cockecoeske is well documented to have died in 1686.

It has been suggested that Queen Ann and Queen Betty may have been the same person:

Sparse documentation and the Powhatan Indians' practice of changing their names on important occasions have led to confusion in identifying the principal leaders of the Pamunkey. It has been conjectured that the niece who succeeded Cockacoeske, Mrs. Betty, and Ann were the same woman and that she changed her name to Ann after Queen Anne ascended the English throne in 1702.

Ann's last record in history was in 1715, when she was noted as visiting the colonial authorities in Virginia. She had come to seek fair treatment for her tribe, who suffered encroachment and raids by settlers. The Pamunkey had, in spite of Totopotomoi's sacrifice, been treated poorly by the Virginian settlers in the intervening years. Ann attempted to protect the survival of her people by petitioning to halt the sale of tribal land to outsiders, and halt the sale of liquor to members of the tribe.

Ann had a son, whom she sent to the Indian school at the College of William and Mary in 1711. He was sent as part of an agreement with the governor of Virginia: if her son and another Pamunkey child were sent to the Indian school, the tribe's debt would be forgiven. Ann's son's name is not known as many records were either not kept or were destroyed by war and time.

Ann is believed to have died around 1723.

| Preceded by Queen Betty | Weroansqua of the Pamunkey; 1708–1723 | Succeeded by unknown |
