= Weston Manor =

Historic house in Virginia, United States

- U.S. National Register of Historic Places
- Virginia Landmarks Register
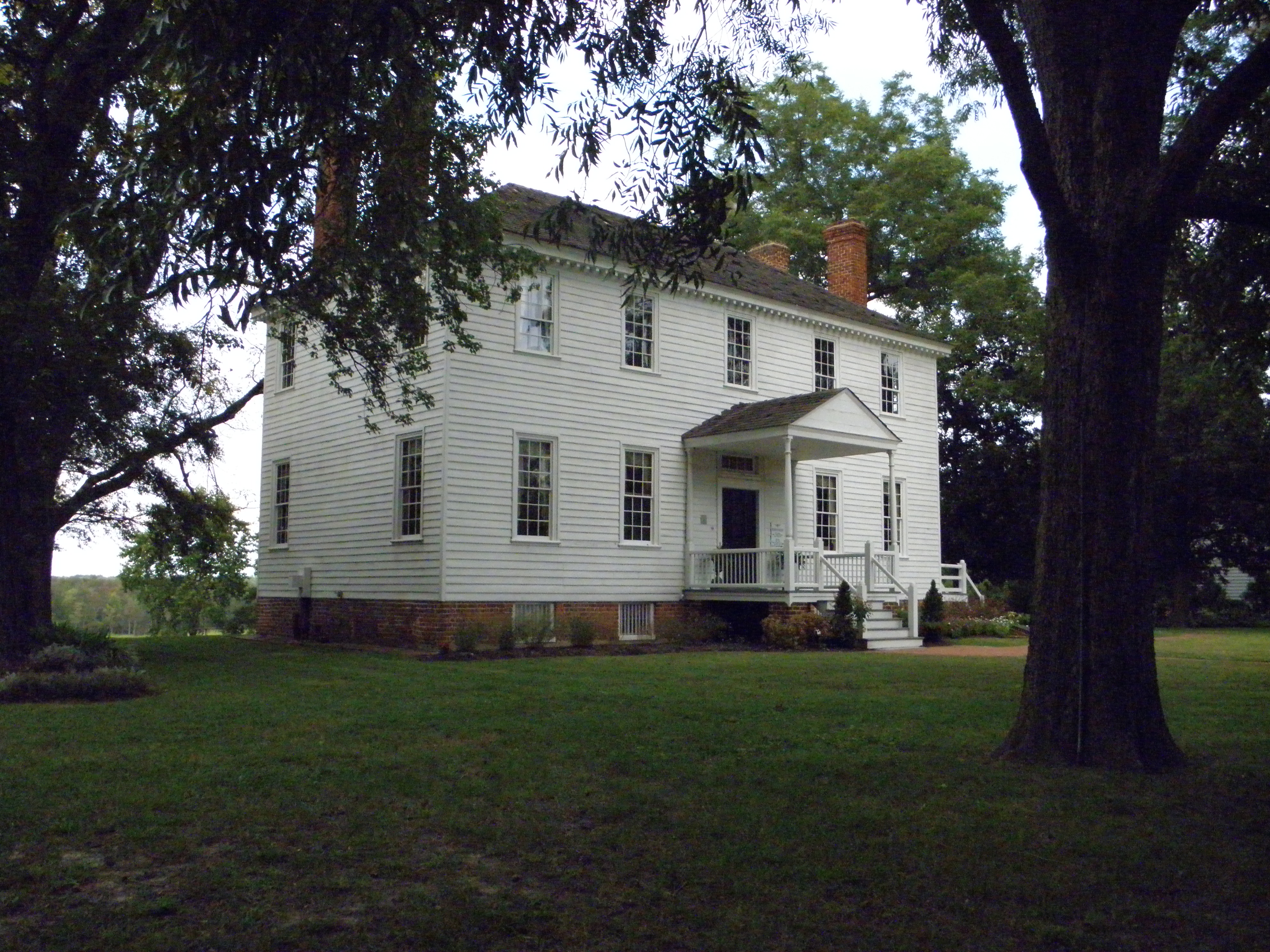
- Weston Manor

- Location within Virginia Location within the United States
- Location: Off VA 10 on S bank of Appomattox River, Hopewell, Virginia
- Coordinates: 37°18′31″N 77°18′16″W
- Area: 3 acres (1.2 ha)
- Built: 1780
- Architectural style: Georgian
- NRHP reference No.: 72001505
- VLR No.: 116-0002

Significant dates
- Added to NRHP: April 13, 1972
- Designated VLR: November 16, 1971

Weston Manor is an 18th-century plantation house on the south shore of the Appomattox River in Hopewell, Virginia.

== History ==
William and Christian Eppes Gilliam built their home, Weston Manor, in 1789 on land in Prince George County that was acquired two years earlier from her cousin John Wayles Eppes. The Gilliam family arrived in Virginia in the 17th century as indentured servants. By the late 18th century through hard work and smart marriages the family had amassed several plantations in the area. Christian was the daughter of Richard Eppes of neighboring Appomattox Plantation. Weston Manor was originally known as Western Manor because it was west of Appomattox Plantation, also known as Appomattox Manor.

== Current status ==
Weston Manor is listed on the National Register of Historic Places. It is noted for its period interior.
