= Weroance =

Native American political office

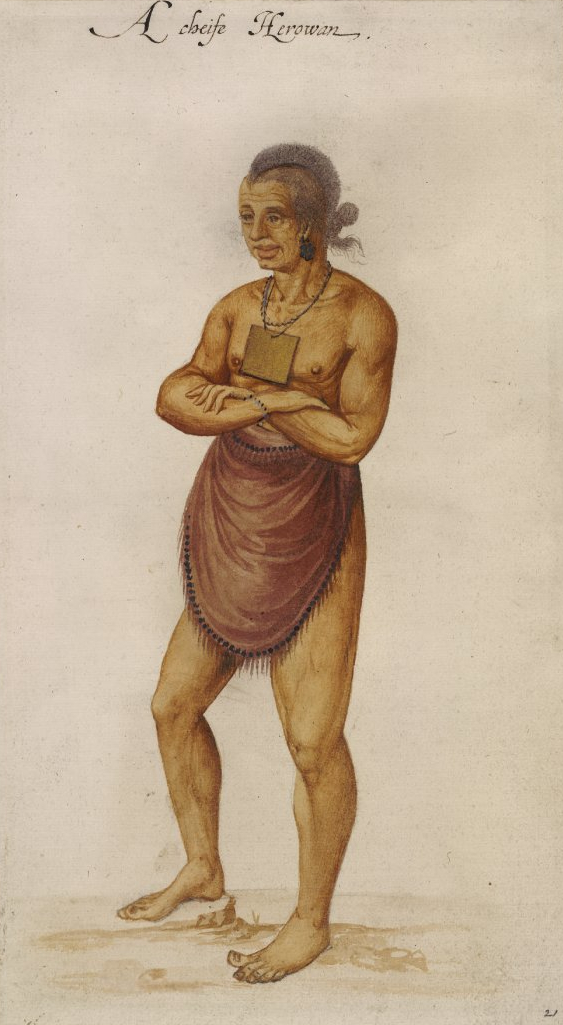
Portrait of a Weroance (possibly Wingina)

Weroance ([we:ɹoanz] or [we:ɹoans] or [we:ɹoəns]) is an Algonquian word meaning leader or commander which was used throughout the Chesapeake Bay region including in the Powhatan Confederacy and the Piscataway Confederacy. Weroances within these confederacies were under paramount Weroances called Mamantowick and Tayac respectively. Like their predecessors, each member/weroancy of the Powhatan Confederacy was led by their own Weroance often chosen by their leader, the Mamantowick, from their relatives or partners. Most foreign writers who have come across a Weroance only did so on a special occasion. This is the case because a foreigner's presence was special. John Smith noted that there are few differences between Weroances and their citizens. Present day leaders of Chesapeake nations, such as Chief Anne, no longer use the title Weroance, using the english word chief instead.

In older texts, especially from the time of the early Jamestown settlers, spelling was not standardized, so the following spellings are used in different texts:

- Weeroance
- Weroance
- Werowance
- Werowans
- Wyroance
- Wyrounce
- Wyrounnces

A Weroansqua is a female Weroance. Spellings of this word also vary. Many Weroansquas were notable for their humanitarian and environmental efforts, helping protect their land and communities from colonial control and exploitation. Specifically, Cockacoeske was a prominent example, using diplomacy and political influence to defend Powhatan borders, even renegotiating an environmental treaty with the English Crown in 1677.

== Powers of a Weroance ==
Each Weroance typically had final say on how to handle a hostile situation that was solely within their respective weroancy. This was made apparent with the founding of Virginia colony in 1607 and the warfare with the English colonists. Weroances and religious leaders were the only ones allowed to enter into sacred spaces. A Weroance did not go to meet any visitor, visitors were escorted to see a Weroance. The Weroance, their wives, and councilors often dressed in the finest jewels, and tanned deer skin.

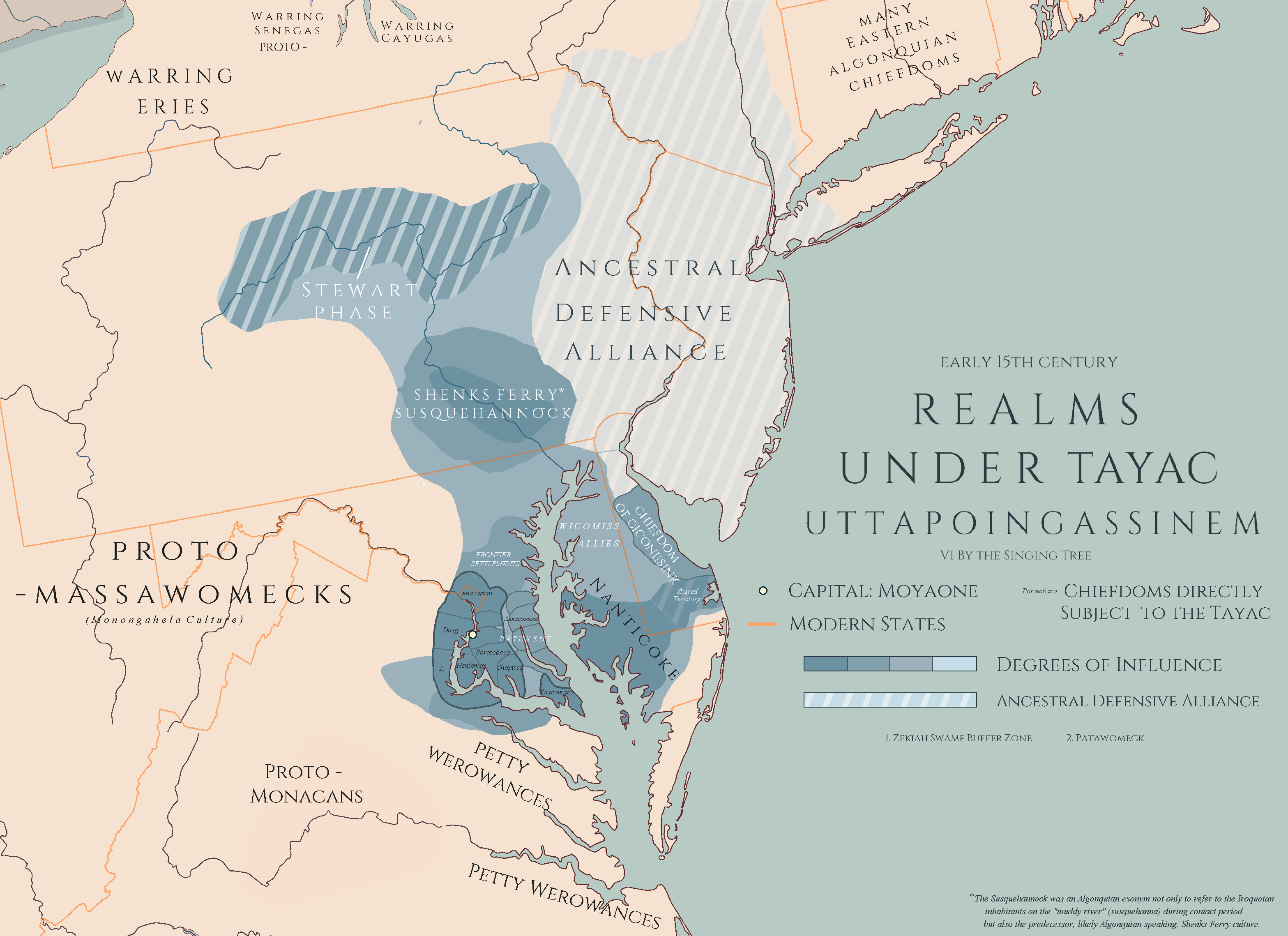
Uttapoingassinem's Confederacy in the Early 15th Century

== Individual Weroances ==
Several of the Weroances' personal names were known and some recorded by William Strachey and other sources. The names of their respective weroancies were also commonly used as titles, analogous to European peerages, so that the Weroance of Arrohattec (whose given name was Ashaquid) was often referred to simply as "Arrohattec", much as the Earl of Essex would be referred to just as "Essex" in lieu of a personal name.

- Parahunt, Weroance of the Powhatan (proper), also called Tanx ("little") Powhatan, said by Strachey to be a son of Wahunsenacawh, and often confused with him.
- Pochins, a Weroance of the Kecoughtan appointed by Wahunsenacawh some time after killing their previous ruler in ca. 1598.
- Oholasc (r. early 1600s-1620s), a werowance of Quiyoughcohannock and wife of the Mamantowick Wahunsenacawh.
- Opossunoquonuske (r. before 1607-1610), a Weroance of an Appomattoc town near the mouth of the Appomattox River.
- Opechancanough (r. 1618-1646), Wahunsenacawh younger brother, was a Weroance of the Pamunkey, but increased in power, and came to be the effective ruler of the entire Powhatan Confederacy after Wahunsenacawh's death in 1618.
- Cockacoeske (r. 1656-1686), Weroance of the Pamunkey for thirty years, including during Bacon's Rebellion and the Treaty of 1677. She also attempted to assert herself as leader of a revived Powhatan Confederacy.
- Queen Betty (r. 1686-1702), Weroance of the Pamunkey as successor of Cockacoeske
- Queen Ann (r. 1708-1723), Weroance of the Pamunkey as successor of Queen Betty

== Matrilineal inheritance ==
In the Powhatan Confederacy, women could inherit power, because the inheritance of power was matrilineal. In A Map of Virginia John Smith of Jamestown explains:

His [Chief Powhatan's] kingdome descendeth not to his sonnes nor children: but first to his brethren, whereof he hath 3 namely Opitchapan, Opechancanough, and Catataugh; and after their decease to his sisters. First to the eldest sister, then to the rest: and after them to the heires male and female of the eldest sister; but never to the heires of the males.

== See also ==
- Sachem
- Cacique
