= Tri-Cities (Central Virginia) =

Independent cities in the Richmond, Virginia metropolitan area

Coordinates: 37.2500°N 77.4000°W

Tri-Cities, Virginia Part of Richmond Metropolitan Statistical Area
- Metropolitan Statistical Area
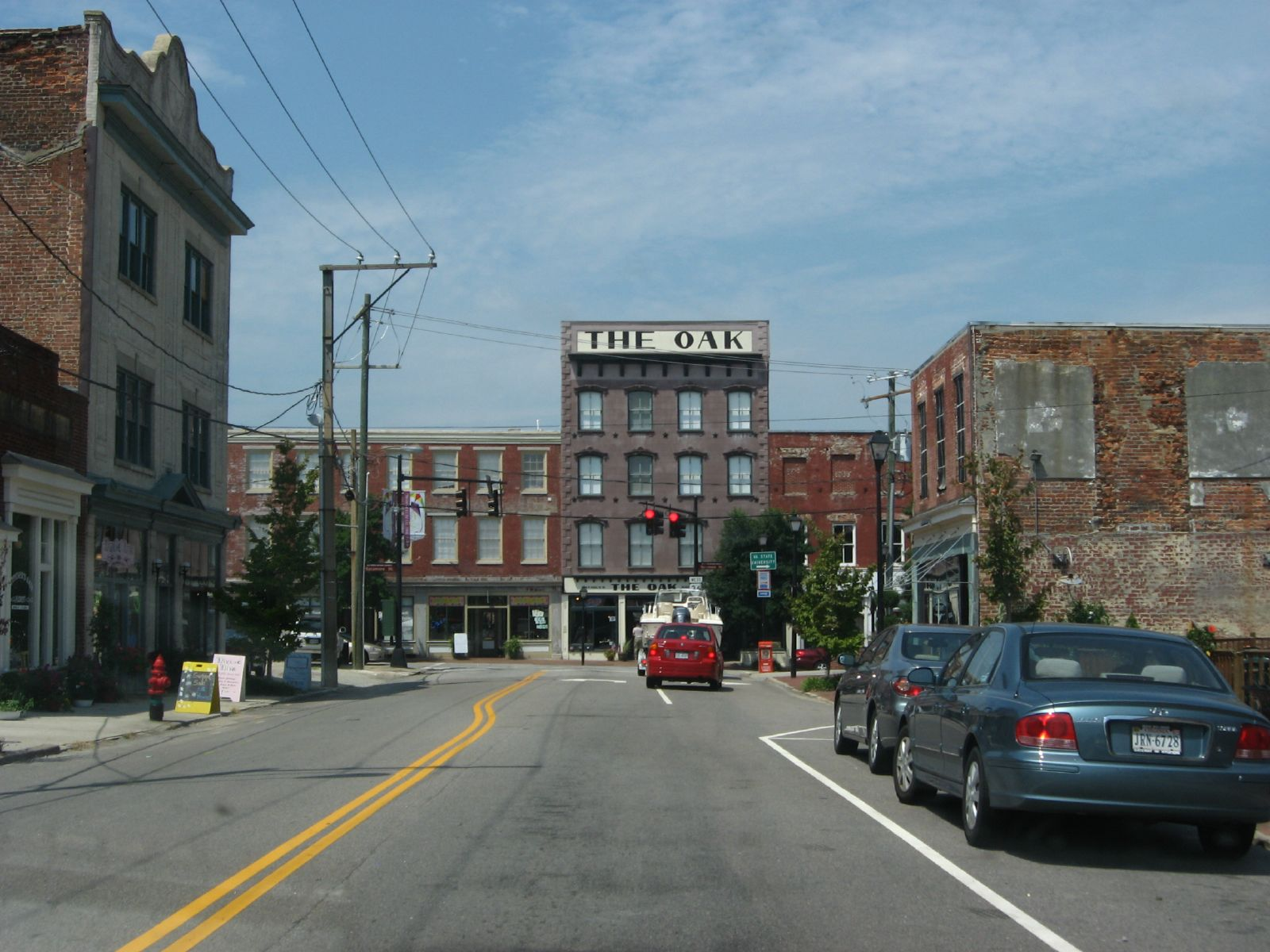
- Downtown Petersburg
Map of Richmond MSA including Tri-Cities area
City of Richmond
Greater Richmond
Tri-Cities Area
- Country: United States
- Largest city: Richmond
- Other cities: Petersburg; Hopewell; Colonial Heights

Area
  - Total: 4,367 sq mi (11,310 km^{2})

Population
  - Total: 1,314,434
  - Rank: 44th-largest in the U.S.

GDP
  - Total: $116.960 billion (2023)

The Tri-Cities of Virginia (also known as the Tri-City area or the Appomattox Basin) is an area in the Greater Richmond Region which includes the three independent cities of Petersburg, Colonial Heights, and Hopewell and portions of the adjoining counties of Chesterfield, Dinwiddie, and Prince George in south-central Virginia. Other unincorporated communities located in the Tri-Cities area include Ettrick, Fort Lee, and City Point, the latter formerly a historic incorporated town which was annexed to become part of the City of Hopewell.

== Regional description ==
The Tri-Cities area is centered on the Appomattox River about 25 miles (40 km) south of Richmond. The Appomattox has its confluence with the James River near historic City Point in Hopewell. The applicable Metropolitan Statistical Area for the Tri-Cities area is the Richmond, VA MSA, which includes Richmond and counties generally to the north of the Tri-Cities area. Economic diversity is typical of the entire Richmond-Petersburg region, and helps to insulate it from hardship due to economic fluctuation in particular sectors of the economy. The region has been undergoing an opioid epidemic for several years now as well. The region's central location also allows it to benefit from growth in other regions of Virginia and the state as a whole.

== Transportation in the Tri-Cities ==
Interstate 95 is the major north–south highway. Interstate 85 and Interstate 295 also pass through, as does U.S. Route 1 (The Boulevard in Colonial Heights), U.S. Route 301, State Route 144 (Temple Avenue). Major east–west highways are U.S. Route 460, State Route 10, and State Route 36.

Major river crossings include the Martin Luther King Memorial Bridge and the twin Charles Hardaway Marks Bridges across the Appomattox River, and the Varina-Enon Bridge and the Benjamin Harrison Memorial Bridge across the James River.

Amtrak passenger railroad service is provided with a station at Ettrick, an unincorporated community in Chesterfield County adjacent to both Petersburg and Colonial Heights. Freight railroad service is provided by both CSX Transportation and Norfolk Southern Corporation.

Bus Transportation is provided by the Petersburg Area Transit. There are nine routes serving parts of Petersburg, Ettrick, Colonial Heights (Southpark Mall area), Fort Gregg-Adams, and Prince George County that all have their intersection in Old Town. PAT and GRTC together provide express bus service between Richmond and Petersburg, with some express buses stopping at Brightpoint Community College in Chester.

== Media ==
Periodicals include:

- The Richmond Times-Dispatch, local daily paper for Richmond.
- The Progress-Index, local daily paper for the Tri-Cities and Sussex located in Petersburg.
- The Colonial Voice, a weekly for Colonial Heights.
- The Traveller, for U.S. Army post then named Fort Lee. Defunct as of January 2021.
- The Chester Village News, for Chesterfield County.
- The Hopewell News & Patriot, (defunct) for Hopewell, Prince George County and Colonial Heights.

Radio and television stations are the same as those listed for Richmond, Virginia.

== Culture ==
Like many cities in the United States, the city of Petersburg is a city that has sought to revitalize its downtown area by promoting its arts scene. In the 1990s and 2000s, several areas including the "Old Town" area has seen increased remodeling and renovating of old, abandoned buildings into loft apartments and eclectic restaurants. In 2004, the Shockoe Bottom Arts group moved from downtown Richmond to downtown Petersburg due to lower real estate prices there. Several antique shops, a former train station, and a theater are the centerpiece of "old town" See Also: Petersburg

Similarly, Hopewell has commenced a revitalization projects with renovations of their harbor complex, "Town Triangle," and the historic Beacon Theatre.

Other cultural productions in the Tri-Cities occur at local colleges and at the playhouse on Fort Gregg-Adams.

== Education ==
Educational facilities in the region are listed as follows:

- K-12
  - Appomattox Regional Governor's School for the Arts And Technology
  - Chesterfield Public Schools
  - Hopewell Public Schools
  - Petersburg Public Schools
  - Prince George Public Schools
  - Dinwiddie Public Schools
  - Colonial Heights Public Schools
- Colleges and Universities
  - Richard Bland College (Petersburg)
  - Virginia State University (Ettrick)
  - Brightpoint Community College (Chester)
  - Army Logistics Management College (Fort Gregg-Adams)

== Infrastructure ==
The area is served by several hospitals, John Randolph Medical Center (a HCA Hospital) (Hopewell), Hiram Davis Medical Center (Acute Care) (Petersburg), Southside Regional Medical Center (Petersburg), and Poplar Springs Hospital (psychiatric facility) (Petersburg).

== Southpark Mall ==
Southpark Mall is a large regional shopping mall in the Tri-Cities area. Built in 1988 at the intersection of State Route 144 and Interstate 95, the mall complex has expanded significantly to include many big box retailers. While the mall itself is located in Colonial Heights, Virginia, other development has increased throughout the area.

== Fort Gregg-Adams ==
Fort Gregg-Adams, formerly Fort Lee, is a United States Army post and headquarters of the U.S. Army Combined Arms Support Command (CASCOM), U.S. Army Quartermaster Center and School (QMCS), the Army Logistics Management College (ALMC) and the U.S. Defense Commissary Agency (DeCA). A United States Army Forces Command (FORSCOM) unit, the 49th Quartermaster Group (Petroleum and Water), is stationed here. Fort Gregg-Adams also hosts two Army museums, the U.S. Army Quartermaster Museum and the U.S. Army Women's Museum. Military personnel make up a significant presence in the area as well.

The fort is named after two African American officers Lt. Gen. Arthur J. Gregg and Lt. Col. Charity Adams. Prior to the fort's redesignation in April 2023, it was named for Confederate General Robert E. Lee.

== Federal prisons ==
The Tri-Cities also is home to a federal prison complex called the Petersburg Federal Correctional Complex. It consists of medium and low security Federal Correctional Institutions known respectively as FCI Petersburg Medium and FCI Petersburg Low. Despite its name, the address of the Petersburg Federal Correctional Complex is actually in Prince George County. In addition, there is United States Probation Office near FCI – Petersburg, in Colonial Heights, Virginia, and the two agencies enjoy a supportive relationship.

== Industries ==
Puddledock Sand & Gravel, in Prince George County, Virginia is a quarry that has made significant alteration of the landscape along the Appomattox River and State Route 144 (Temple Avenue). The quarry is currently owned by Vulcan Materials Company and quarries natural sand as well as asphalt and concrete aggregates for gravel. Ruffin Mill Industrial Park or Appomattox Industrial Park is located off Ruffin Mill Road exit from I-95 and is 298 acres (1.21 km^{2}). Hopewell also is known for a number of chemical manufacturing plants.

== Civil War history ==
Many sites in the Tri-Cities area have names reflecting the region's role in the American Civil War. A major logistics base for the Union Army was located at City Point and the City Point Railroad that enabled the siege of Petersburg is still in operation today. The history of the Battle of the Crater can be viewed in Petersburg National Battlefield Park and is commemorated in nearby Crater Road and the Fort Gregg-Adams entry "Mahone Gate" named after Confederate Brigadier General William Mahone, who was present at the Battle of the Crater during the Siege of Petersburg in 1864. Until 2023, Fort Gregg-Adams was named after Confederate General Robert E. Lee.
