= Abdullah Aiasra =

Jordanian military personnel (1952–2022)

Abdullah Ayasreh
- Born: 4 December 1952; Sakib, Jordan
- Died: 7 September 2022 (aged 69) Amman, Jordan
- Allegiance: Jordan
- Branch: Royal Jordanian Army
- Service years: 1970–2000
- Rank: Brigadier general
- Awards: See below
- Education: Royal Military College; Army Logistics Management College; Naval Postgraduate School

Abdullah Aiasra (Arabic: عبد الله عياصره; 4 December 1952 – 7 September 2022) was a retired Brigadier General of the Royal Jordanian Army. who held several prominent positions throughout his military career.

Born in Sakib on 4 December 1952, Aiasra pursued a military education following high school. He enrolled in the Royal Military College in 1970, graduating in 1972 with a diploma in Military Science and a commission as a Second Lieutenant. His first assignment was with the Royal Maintenance Corps. He later graduated in Supply Chain Management from the U.S. Army Logistics College in 1978, and completed a Master's program in Supply Chain Management at the Naval Postgraduate School in Monterey, California.

Aiasra played a key role in developing a long-term administrative and technical plan for the King Hussein Main Workshops (KHMW), the primary manufacturing and rebuilding facility of the Jordanian Army.

== Awards and decorations ==

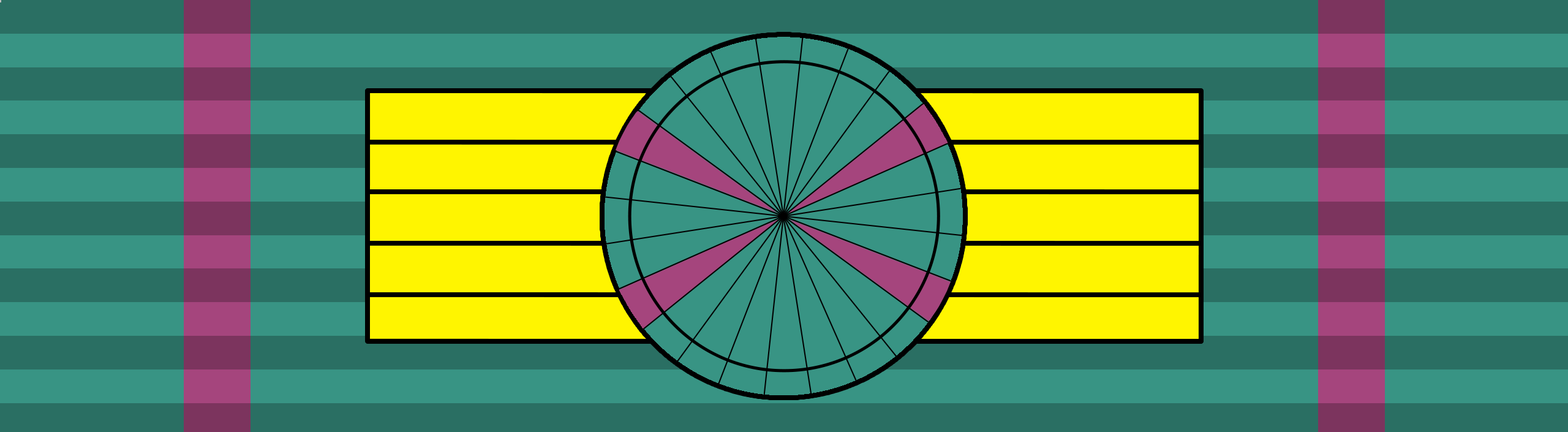

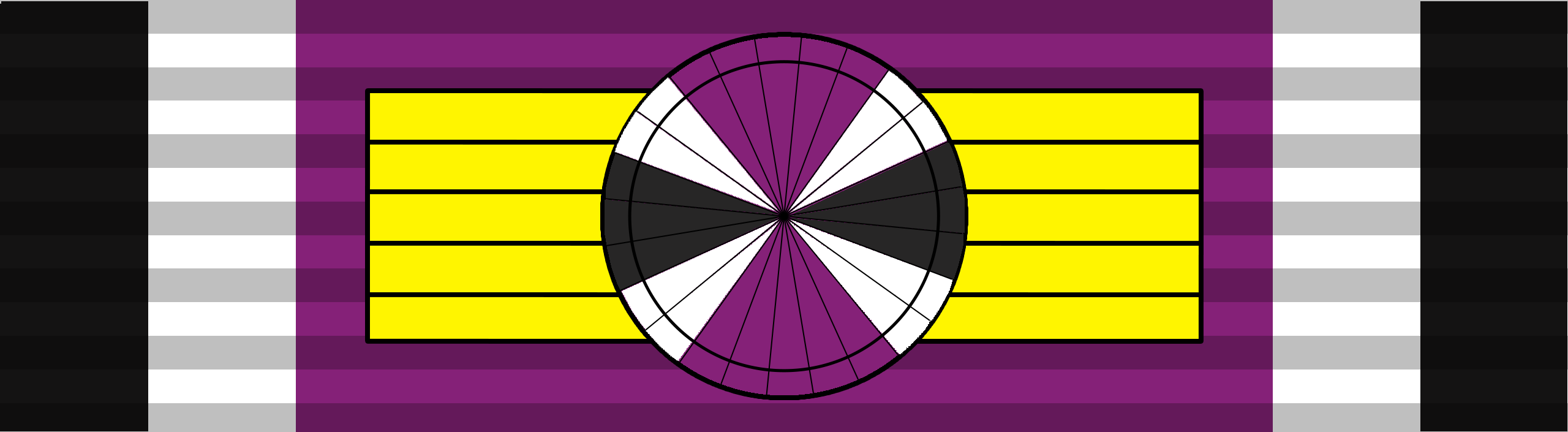

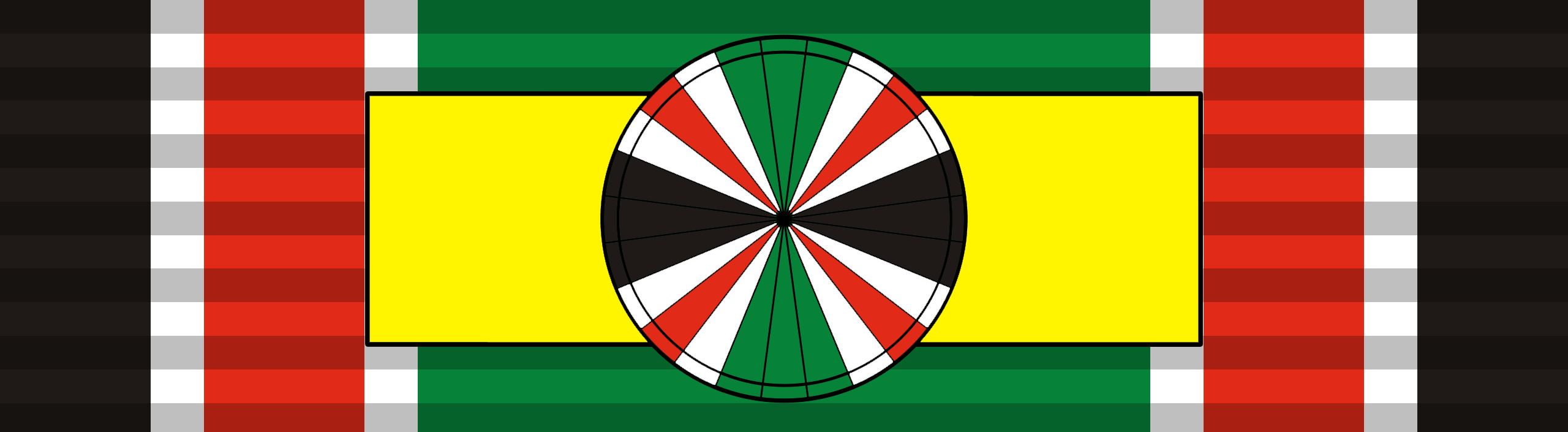

Order of the Renaissance
Order of the Star of Jordan	Order of Independence	Order of Military Merit
Sovereign of the Long Service Medal	Administrative & Leadership Competence Medal	Administrative & Technical Competence Medal
Administrative & Training Competence Medal	Silver Jubilee Medal	Service Medal
Parachutist Badge
