= Walnut Hill Elementary School =

Walnut Hill Elementary School may refer to:

- Walnut Hill Elementary School (Dallas) - Dallas Independent School District
- Walnut Hill Elementary School (Liberty, Kentucky) - Casey County Schools
- Walnut Hill Elementary School (Omaha, Nebraska) - Omaha Public Schools
- Walnut Hill Elementary School (Petersburg, Virginia) - Petersburg City Public Schools
- Walnut Hill Elementary/Middle School (Shreveport, Louisiana) - Caddo Public Schools (Louisiana)

== See also ==
- Walnut Hill School, Natick, Massachusetts
- Walnut Hills Elementary School (Centennial, Colorado) - Cherry Creek Public Schools
