= Ayasrah =

Ayasrah (or Ayasreh) (/æjɑːsrɑː/; Arabic: العياصره pronounced [ʕjaːsˤrh]) is a prominent Jordanian family based in Sakib, Jerash Governorate. The family traces its lineage to Banu Hashim, making them descendants of the Islamic prophet Muhammad.

== Etymology ==
The name Al-Ayasrah originates from Khirbet Aysra, a former village near Sakib that existed during the 16th century. Ottoman records list both Sakib and Aysra as part of the Ajlun subdistrict within the Ajlun district. In the 1538 Ottoman census, Sakib had 13 Muslim households, a mosque, and an imam, while Aysra was recorded as an independent village with 7 Muslim households, also with a mosque and an imam. Over time, Aysra merged with Sakib in the late 16th century and now forms its northern part.

The site was mentioned in 1816 by British traveler James Silk Buckingham, who recorded the name as "Ahheatherah." He noted the presence of large building stones and fine pottery fragments, suggesting the area's ancient origins. Similarly, Frederick Peake confirmed in A History of Trans-Jordan and Its Tribes that the Ayasrah family name derives from their original homeland, Khirbet Aysra, located near Sakib.

== Historical Figures ==
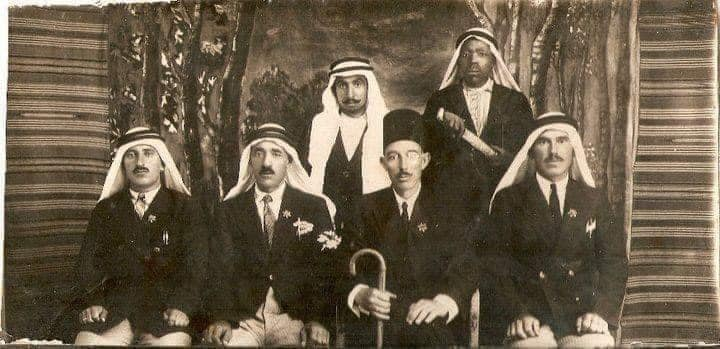
Sheikh Shibli Al-Raja Al-Ayasrah (first first sitting from the left) with members of the Jerash Local Government on September 2, 1920.

=== Sheikh Shibli Al-Raja Al-Ayasrah (1874–1960) ===
Sheikh Shibli was a notable figure in the family's history. He was a member of the Jerash Local Government, established in 1920 following the fall of the Arab Government of Damascus after the Battle of Maysalun. This local government played a crucial role in maintaining security and governance in Transjordan.

=== Sheikh Raja Al-Mustafa Al-Ayasrah (1830–1916) ===
Sheikh Raja, Shibli’s father, served as the Mukhtar (headman) of Sakib from 1860 under an Ottoman decree. He remained in this position until his assassination in August 1916 by Ottoman military forces affiliated with the Young Turks, following his public support for the Arab Revolt in June 1916. He was killed in his Diwan in Sakib.

== Family tree ==
Wahdan Bek ibn Khalifa Bek ibn Sulaiman Bek ibn Uthman Bek ibn Sulaiman ibn Prince Salim ibn Prince Muhammad ibn Sadr al-Din Ali ibn Hasan ibn Muhammad ibn Ismael al-Saleh ibn al-Sultan Ali ibn Yahya ibn Thabit ibn Ali al-Hazim ibn Ahmed al-Murtada ibn Ali ibn al-Hasan al-Hashemi ibn Ali al-Mahdi ibn Muhammad ibn al-Hasan al-Qasim ibn al-Husayn al-Radi ibn Ahmed al-Saleh ibn Musa Abi Sabha ibn Ibrahim al-Murtada ibn Musa ibn Ja'far ibn Muhammad ibn Ali ibn Husayn, grandson of Muhammad.

— Wahdan Bek is the ancestor of the Ayasrah family, and he is the 31st-generation direct descendant of Muhammad.

Hashim; Ancestor of the Hashemites
Abdul-Muttalib
Abdullah	Abu Talib
MUHAMMAD	Ali
Fatimah
Husayn
Ali
Muhammad
Ja'far
Musa
Ibrahim al-Murtada
Musa Abi Sabha
Ahmed al-Saleh
al-Husayn al-Radi
al-Hasan al-Qasim
Muhammad
Ali al-Mahdi
al-Hasan al-Hashemi
Ali
Ahmed al-Murtada
Ali al-Hazim
Thabit
Yahya
al-Sultan Ali
Ismael al-Saleh
Muhammad
Hasan
Sadr al-Din Ali
Prince Muhammad
Prince Salim
Sulaiman
Uthman Bek
Sulaiman Bek
Khalifa Bek
Wahdan Bek

== Sources ==
- Bakhīt, M. A.; Ḥamūd, N. R. (1989). Daftar mufaṣṣal Liwāʼ ʻAjlūn : ṭābū daftarī raqm 970, Istānbūl = Kanunname-yi Liva-yı Aclun. (The Detailed Defter of the Liwāʼ of ʻAjlūn (Year 1538)). Amman: The University of Jordan. OCLC 28579987.
- Buckingham, J.S. (1825). Travels among the Arab Tribes inhabiting the countries east of Syria and Palestine…. London: Longman, Hurst, Rees, Orme, Brown and Green.
- Peake, Frederick Gerard (1934). A history of Trans-Jordan and its tribes [تاريخ شرقي الأردن وقبائلها] (in Arabic). Amman.
- Sulṭān, Fatḥī ʻAbd al-Qādir (2009). Mawsūʻat ansāb Āl al-Bayt al-Nabawī. (Encyclopedia of the Lineages of Ahl al-Bayt, the Prophetic Family.). Vol. 3. Amman: al-Dār al-ʻArabīyah lil-Mawsūʻāt. OCLC 542672418.
