= Petersburg Area Transit =

- Parent: City of Petersburg
- Founded: City Acquired June 1977
- Headquarters: 100 West Washington Street
- Locale: Petersburg, Virginia
- Service area: Petersburg, Colonial Heights, Hopewell, Ettrick Virginia State University, McGuire Veterans Hospital, Richmond VA and Fort Gregg-Adams
- Service type: bus service, paratransit
- Alliance: GRTC, Blackstone Bus Service
- Routes: 11 Local Routes, 2 Express routes (operated by partner agencies)
- Stops: 380
- Stations: 1
- Fleet: Gillig 35 & 40 Ft BRT, Arboc Sprit Of Freedom, F550 Medium Duty, Trolley, Eldorado EZ Rider II
- Fuel type: Diesel, Gas, Propane
- Operator: City Of Petersburg
- Chief executive: Transit Director Darius Mason
- Website: www.ridepat.com

Petersburg Area Transit is a bus system for the Petersburg Tri-cities Area. There are twelve color-coded routes that extend to such destinations as Virginia State University, Southpark Mall, and Fort Lee Military Base.

In a partnership with Greater Richmond Transit Company (GRTC), PAT provides express service to Downtown Richmond and any other destinations accessible by GRTC. As of June 2009, in addition to the service to Richmond, Blackstone Bus Service offers and express route that travels from Blackstone, VA through Dinwiddie into the City of Petersburg. Dinwiddie Express utilizes the Petersburg Transit Station and normally parks in track 7. .

A centralized multi-modal transit hub for the PAT is now being used as the transfer point for all buses. It is located at the corner of Union at Washington streets and Wythe at Union Streets.

== Routes ==
- Route 1: Walnut Hill/Tanglewood Apartments/Food Lion/Walmart/Southside Medical Center
- Route 2: Southpark Mall/American Family Fitness/Wal-Mart/Marshall's/Burlington/Puddledock Rd/Lowes
- Route 3: Richmond Express/McGuire Veterans Hospital/Brightpoint Community College
- Route 4: Blandford/Fort Lee/Hopewell Crossings
- Route 5: 460/County Drive/Pine Tree Apartments/Walmart
- Route 6: South Crater Road/Walmart/Social Services
- Route 10: Halifax Street/Virginia Avenue/Petersburg High School
- Route 11: Washington Street/Route 1/Central State Hospital/Summit Point/Lee Avenue
- Route 12: Ettrick/Virginia State University/Mall Plaza/Oakhurst Subdvision
- Route 13: Richard Bland College/Wal-Mart/Southside Medical Center
- Route 14: City of Hopewell/John Randolph Hospital/Hopewell High School
- Route 21 Walnut Hill/RBC (Evening Service Route 7:15p-10:15p)
- Route 22 Ettrick/Southpark (Evening Service Route 7:15p-10:15p)
- Route 23 Washington/Halifax (Evening Service Route 7:15p-10:15p)
- Route 24 Blandford/Puddledock (Evening Service Route 7:15p-10:15p)
- Route 25 Crater Rd/County Drive(Evening Service Route 7:15p-10:15p)

== See also ==
- Transportation in Virginia
