= Aysra =

Khirbet Aysra
- عيصره or عيصرا (Arabic)
- Aysra
- Interactive map of Khirbet Aysra
- 32°17′44″N 35°49′02″E
- Cultures: Islamic, Ottoman
- Associated with: Ayasrah family
- Location: Sakib, Jerash Governorate, Jordan
- Region: Northern Jordan
- Part of: Sakib
- PAL: 227/189

Site notes
- Elevation: 1,000 m (3,300 ft)

Aysra or 'esara (عيصره or عيصرا) is an archaeological village located in the northern district of the town of Sakib in Jerash Governorate, northern Jordan. Also known as Khirbet Aysra, it is situated near Mount Troun and contains remnants of ancient buildings and flowing water springs, highlighting its historical significance. Sakib and Aysra are closely associated with the prominent Al-Ayasrah family, which derives its name from Aysra (or khirbet Aysra).

== Historical Background ==
Aysra is mentioned in early Ottoman records as part of the administrative and economic system in the nahiyah (subdistrict) of Ajlun of the liwa (district) of Ajlun. According to the detailed register of the Ajlun District from 1538, the village had seven households and an imam, with an estimated population of about 42 individuals. Aysra contributed 25% of its production, with an annual contribution of 1,000 akçe. By 1596, the contribution decreased to 750 akçe, while the neighboring Sakib's contribution increased from 1,300 to 2,500 akçe.

In 1816, the explorer and traveler James Silk Buckingham visited the site and recorded its name the Ayasrah (Ahheatherah). He noted that the large stones used in its buildings, along with the vast amount of fine pottery fragments scattered around, indicated that it was an ancient site.

In 1890, during the geographical survey of East Jordan, Gottlieb Schumacher mentioned it as one of the important archaeological sites surrounding Jerash.

== Relationship with Sakib ==
Sakib is one of the largest towns in Jerash Governorate, having maintained a stable population throughout history, reflecting its rich cultural heritage. Aysra and Sakib have long-standing historical and cultural ties, with their past closely intertwined with the Ayasrah family. By the late sixteenth century, Aysra had merged with Sakib and now forms its northern part. Ottoman records and historical sources, such as Frederick Peake’s History of Eastern Jordan and Its Tribes, document this connection, noting that the Ayasrah derived their name from their original homeland, Khirbet Aysra, located near Sakib.

== Archaeological Features ==
Khirbet Aysra contains remnants of ancient buildings, a natural spring, and a water canal. Although the full extent of its historical layers remains unexplored, its strategic location near Sakib and Mount Toron indicates its historical role. Today, Aysra is recognized for its archaeological heritage and attracts researchers and historians studying the history of northern Jordan, particularly during the early Ottoman period.

== See also ==
- Sakib
- Ayasrah
- Jerash

== Bibliography ==
- Bakhīt, M. A.; Ḥamūd, N. R. (1989). Daftar mufaṣṣal Liwāʼ ʻAjlūn : ṭābū daftarī raqm 970, Istānbūl = Kanunname-yi Liva-yı Aclun. (The Detailed Defter of the Liwāʼ of ʻAjlūn (Year 1538)). Amman: The University of Jordan. OCLC 28579987.
- Bakhīt, M. A.; Ḥamūd, N. R. (2011). Daftar mufaṣṣal Liwāʼ ʻAjlūn : ṭābū daftarī raqm 185, Anqarah sanat 1005 Hijrī muwāfiq 1596 Mīlādī (The Detailed Defter of the Liwāʼ of ʻAjlūn (Year 1596)). Amman: al-Lajnah al-ʻUlyā li-Kitābat Tārīkh al-Urdun. OCLC 804860870.
- Buckingham, J.S. (1825). Travels among the Arab Tribes inhabiting the countries east of Syria and Palestine…. London: Longman, Hurst, Rees, Orme, Brown and Green.
- Hütteroth, W.-D.; Abdulfattah, K. (1977). Historical Geography of Palestine, Transjordan and Southern Syria in the Late 16th Century. Erlanger Geographische Arbeiten, Sonderband 5. Erlangen, Germany: Vorstand der Fränkischen Geographischen Gesellschaft. ISBN 3-920405-41-2.
- Peake, F. (1934). A history of Trans-Jordan and its tribes [تاريخ شرقي الأردن وقبائلها] (in Arabic). Amman.
- Schumacher, G (1895). Deutscher Verein zur Erforschung Palästinas (in German). University of Minnesota.
