= Petersburg, Virginia =

Independent city in Virginia, United States

- Independent city
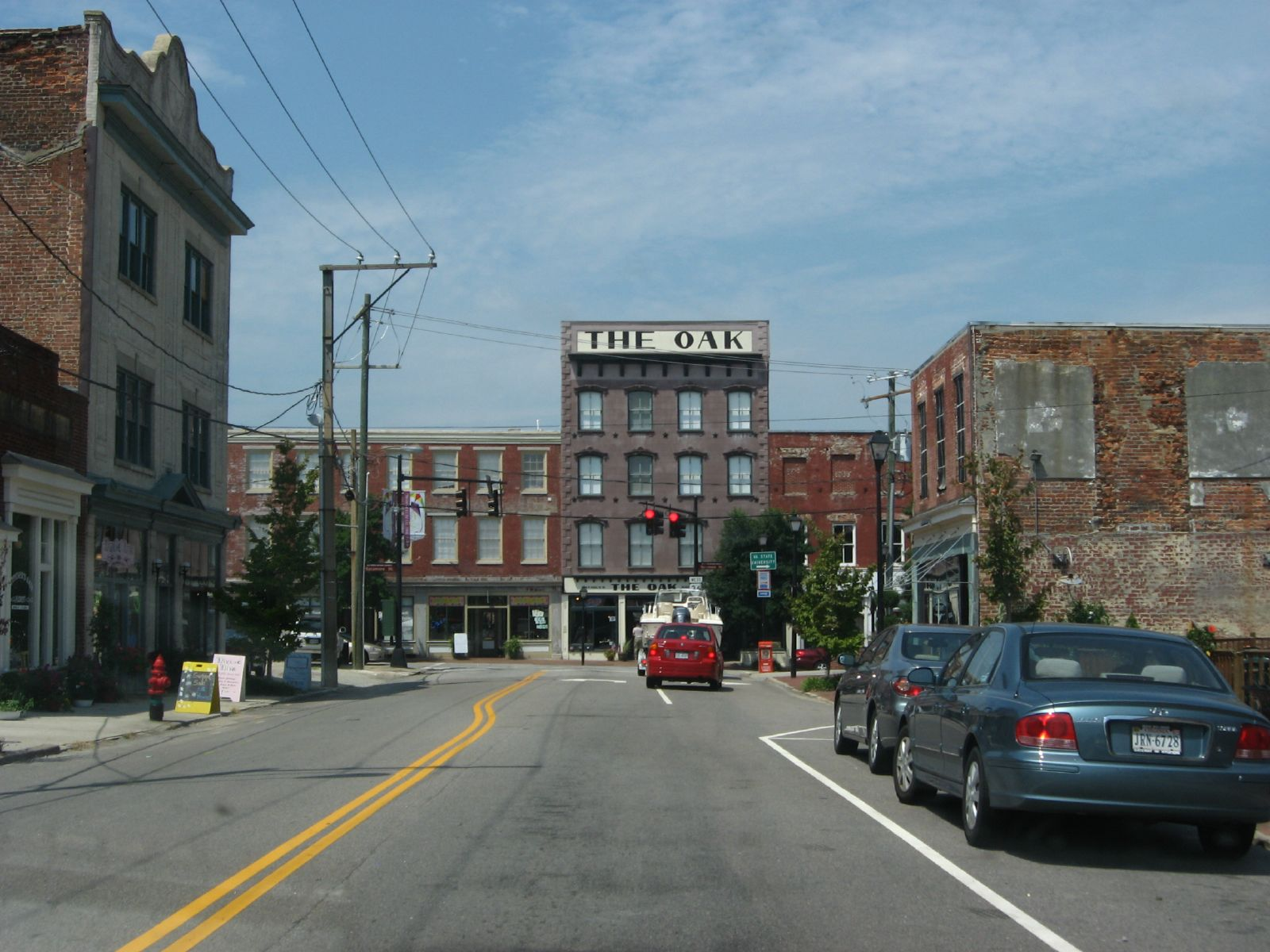
- Downtown Petersburg

- Flag Seal
- Nickname: "The Cockade City" " Old Towne "
- Interactive map of Petersburg, Virginia
- Coordinates: 37.23°N 77.405°W
- Country: United States
- State: Commonwealth of Virginia
- County: None (Independent city)
- Founded: December 17, 1748
- Named for: Peter Jones

Government
  - Mayor: Sam Parham

Area
  - Total: 22.94 sq mi (59.42 km^{2})
  - Land: 22.72 sq mi (58.85 km^{2})
  - Water: 0.22 sq mi (0.58 km^{2})
- Elevation: 130 ft (40 m)

Population (2020)
  - Total: 33,458
  - Estimate (2025): 33,734 ▲
  - Density: 1,472/sq mi (568.5/km^{2})
- Time zone: UTC-05:00 (EST)
  - Summer (DST): UTC-04:00 (EDT)
- ZIP codes: 23803–23806
- Area codes: 804 and 686
- FIPS code: 51-61832
- GNIS ID: 1497087
- Website: www.petersburgva.gov

Petersburg is an independent city in the U.S. state of Virginia. As of the 2020 census, the population was 33,458. The Bureau of Economic Analysis combines Petersburg (along with the city of Colonial Heights) with Dinwiddie County for statistical purposes. The city is 21 miles (34 km) south of the commonwealth (state) capital city of Richmond. It sits at the fall line of the Appomattox River, a tributary of the longer, larger James River which flows east to meet the southern mouth of the Chesapeake Bay at the Hampton Roads harbor and the Atlantic Ocean.

In 1645, the Virginia House of Burgesses ordered the building of Fort Henry, which attracted traders and settlers to the area. Three settlements were incorporated into the Town of Petersburg in 1748. Petersburg rebuilt after a devastating 1815 fire and became a transportation and industrial hub. It was the final destination on the Upper Appomattox Canal Navigation System, which opened in 1816. When its Appomattox River port silted up, investors built an 8-mile railroad to City Point on the James River, which opened in 1838—one of four railroads built before the American Civil War.

In 1860, it was the state's second-largest city, after Richmond. It connected commerce from Farmville, Virginia, at the foothills of the Blue Ridge and the Appalachian Mountains chain, to shipping into the Chesapeake Bay and North Atlantic Ocean.

During the American Civil War (1861–1865), the railroad network made Petersburg critical to Union plans to capture Richmond, the Confederate States' national capital. The city was devastated by the 1864–65 Siege of Petersburg, which included the Battle of the Crater and nine months of trench warfare. Battlefield sites are partly preserved as Petersburg National Battlefield by the National Park Service of the U.S. Department of the Interior. Petersburg rebuilt its railroads, including a connecting terminal, by 1866, but it never regained its economic position because much shipping traffic continued to the Norfolk seaport. After the consolidations of smaller railroads, the CSX and Norfolk Southern railway networks serve Petersburg.

Petersburg has the oldest free black settlements in the state, at Pocahontas Island. Two Baptist churches in the city, whose congregations were founded in the late 18th century, are among the oldest black congregations and churches in the United States. In the post-bellum period, a historically black college which later developed as the Virginia State University was established nearby in Ettrick in Chesterfield County. In the 20th century, these and other black churches were leaders in the national Civil Rights Movement of the 1950s-1960s. Richard Bland College, located in nearby Prince George, was originally established as a branch of Williamsburg's famed College of William and Mary.

Petersburg remains a transportation hub. Area highways include Interstate Highways 85, 95, and U.S. Route highways with 1, 301, and 460. Both CSX and Norfolk Southern rail systems maintain transportation centers at Petersburg. Amtrak serves the city with daily Northeast Regional passenger trains to Norfolk, Virginia, and long-distance routes from states to the South.

In the early 21st century, Petersburg civic leaders promote the city's historical attractions for heritage tourism, as well as industrial sites reachable by the transportation infrastructure. The federal government is also a major employer, with nearby Fort Lee, as home of the United States Army's Sustainment Center of Excellence, and the Army's Logistics Branch, Ordnance, Quartermaster, and Transportation Corps.

== History ==
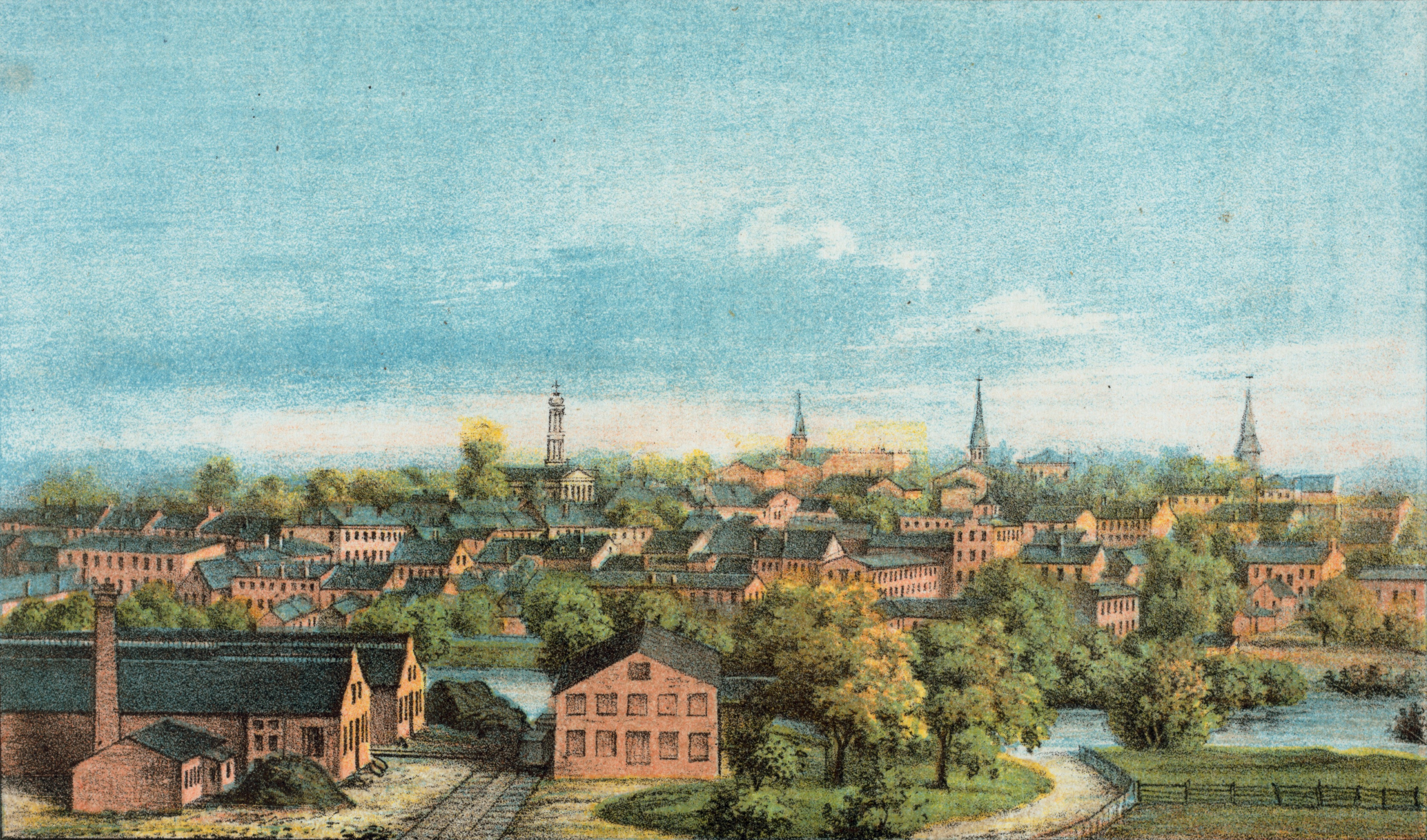
Petersburg, Va., from Duns Hill, c. 1880

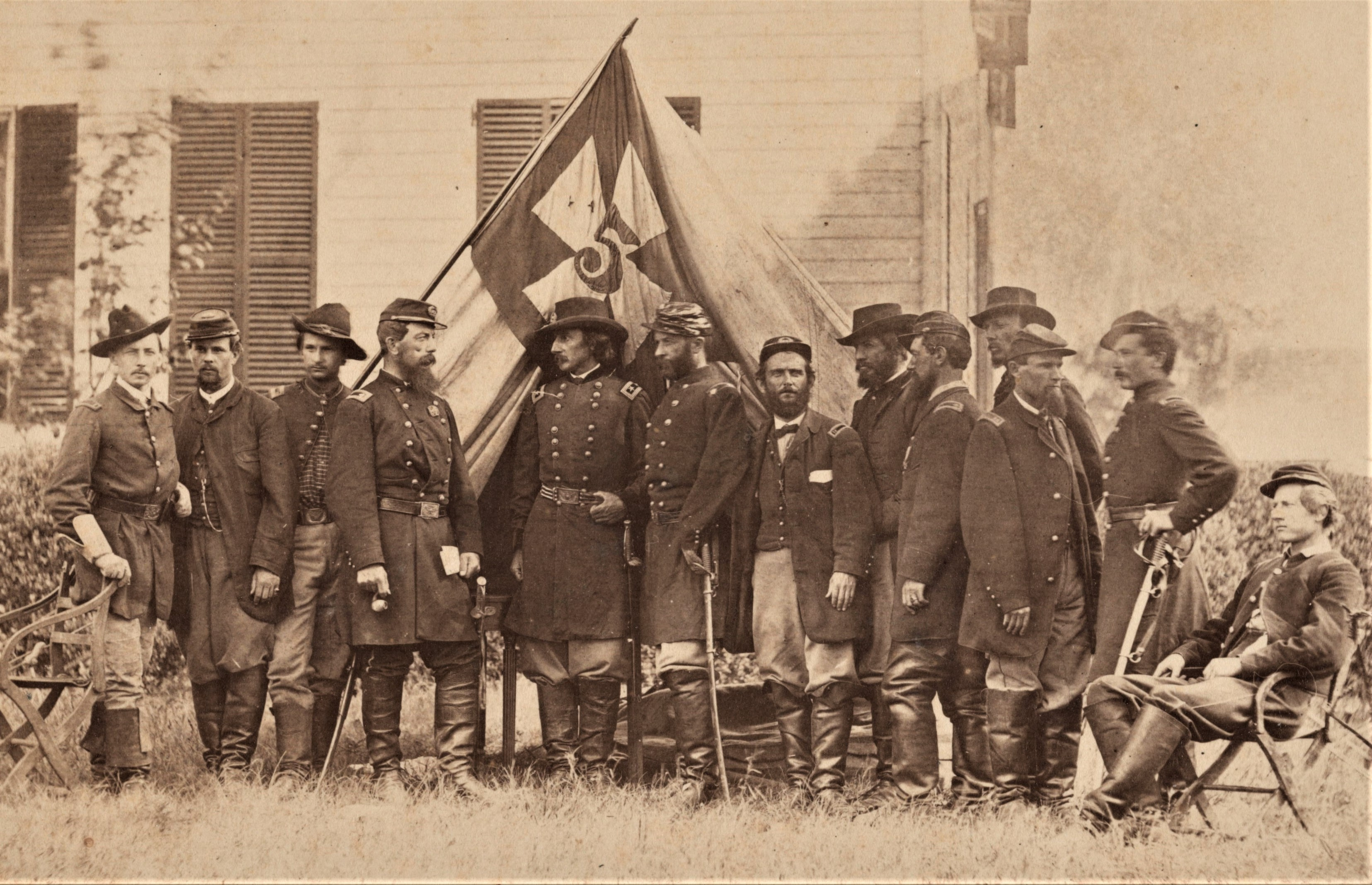
The Civil War headquarters staff of the Army of the Potomac's 5th Corps at the home of Col. Isaac E. Avery near Petersburg, photographed by Mathew Brady in June 1864; the following month, on July 3, Avery was killed in the Battle of Gettysburg.

=== Indigenous peoples ===
Archaeological excavations at Pocahontas Island found evidence of a prehistoric Native American settlement dated to 6,500 BCE, the early third of the Archaic Period (8,000 to 1,000 BCE). Succeeding cultures of indigenous peoples lived in the area for thousands of years before European exploration and colonization.

When the English arrived in Virginia in 1607, the region was occupied by the Appamatuck, a significant tribe of the Powhatan Confederacy. They were governed by a weroance, King Coquonosum, and by his sister, Queen Oppussoquionuske. This Algonquian-speaking people later had a town at Rohoic Creek (formerly known as Rohowick or Indian Towne Run). Present-day Petersburg developed to the east.

=== Founding ===
Petersburg was founded at a strategic point at the fall line of the Appomattox River and settled by English colonists. By 1635 they had patented land along the south bank of the Appomattox River as far west as present-day Sycamore Street, and about 1 mile (1.6 km) inland. In 1646, the Virginia Colony established Fort Henry a short distance from the Appamatuck town, near the falls. It provided waterpower for mills and later industrialization. Col. Abraham Wood sent several famous expeditions out from here in the following years to explore points to the west, as far as the Appalachian Mountains.

Around 1675, Wood's son-in-law, Peter Jones, who then commanded the fort and traded with the Indians, opened a trading post nearby, known as Peter's Point. The Kennon and Bolling families, prominent tobacco planters and traders, also lived in the area and engaged in local politics. In 1733, Col. William Byrd II (who founded Richmond at the same time) conceived plans for a city at Peter's Point, to be renamed Petersburgh. The Virginia General Assembly formally incorporated both Petersburg and adjacent Blandford on December 17, 1748. Wittontown, north of the river, was settled in 1749, and became incorporated as Pocahontas in 1752. Petersburg was enlarged slightly in 1762, adding 28 acres (110,000 m^{2}) to "Old Town".

=== Revolutionary War Period ===
During the American Revolutionary War (1775–1783), the final British drive to regain control of the colony led to the Battle of Blanford in April 1781, which started just east of Petersburg. As Virginia militia retreated north across the Appomattox River, they took up the planks of the wooden Pocahontas bridge to delay the enemy. Although the British captured Blanford and Petersburg, they did not regain the strategic advantage. Lord Cornwallis' forces coming up from the Carolinas into Virginia occupied Yorktown on the York River, waiting to meet a Royal Navy fleet. But a larger combined American-French army soon surrounded and besieged them. Cornwallis and his troops found themselves trapped and isolated when the French Navy's West Indies fleet under Admiral de Grasse sailed north and won the offshore naval Battle of the Capes at the mouth of the Chesapeake Bay, forcing the British resupply and evacuation fleet to withdraw. In October 1781, Lord Cornwallis surrendered to the superior allied Continental Army's General George Washington and French General comte de Rochambeau. After two further years of infrequent conflict and many treaty parleys, the Revolutionary War ended with Britain formally recognizing the new United States.

After the war, in 1784 Petersburg annexed the adjacent towns of Blandford (also called Blanford), Pocahontas and the outlying town of Ravenscroft, which became neighborhoods of the larger city. An area known as Gillfield was annexed in 1798. Residents' devotion to the cause of America two decades later during the War of 1812 (1812–1815) led to the formation of the militia unit of the Petersburg Volunteers—who distinguished themselves in action at the Siege of Fort Meigs on the Great Lakes frontier on May 5, 1813. Fourth President James Madison called Petersburg "Cockade of the Union" (which later was applied to the town as a nickname "Cockade City"), in honor of the cockades which Volunteers wore on their caps.

=== Petersburg's Free Black Community ===
Petersburg Blacks established the First Baptist (1774) and Gillfield Baptist Church (1797), the first and second oldest black congregations in the city and two of the oldest in the nation. These black churches were the first Baptist churches established in Petersburg. The Gillfield Baptist Church obtained title to its land in 1818 and in 1859 completed a $7000 brick structure; the Petersburg African Baptist Church also owned its own sanctuary and the community also organized burial and other benevolent societies.

Many free blacks in Virginia migrated to the growing urban community, despite increasing legislative restrictions. Until 1860 Petersburg was a majority black American city, although the enslaved population had few legal rights. Between 1850 and 1860, Petersburg's free black community increased 24%, although industrial growth fueled an even greater increase in the white population. Of the 18,366 people counted in Petersburg by federal census takers in 1860, 9,342 were white, 5,680 were slaves, and 3,244 free blacks. Thus in 1860, nearly 26% of all free persons were black, the highest proportion in any Southern city. Free Black men worked as tobacco twisters, in iron foundries, and as draymen, boatmen and cabdrivers, or in the skilled trades of mason, wheelwright, coopers and blacksmiths. Free Black women worked in tobacco factories as stemmers, or as washerwomen or seamstresses or laborers. Plantation owners also brought slaves for hire into the city. As in many other upper South cities, many white households had slaves, but more than 40% were enslaving just one servant.

Pocahontas Island (actually usually a peninsula on the north shore of the Appomattox River) became the area's free black residential area. With access to waterways and a population sympathetic to refugee slaves, this neighborhood was an important site on the Underground Railroad.

=== Antebellum Period ===
During the Antebellum period Petersburg became the slave states' eleventh largest city, and 49th among all American cities in industrial development. Commission merchants (39 firms by 1860) bought agricultural products from nearby Dinwiddie County as well as points to the north, south and west and sold supplies. Petersburg's industrialists processed cotton, tobacco and metal, then shipped the resulting products out of the region. Richmond and Petersburg became the two largest tobacco towns in the world, with Richmond selling 61% of the state's tobacco in 1861, and Petersburg 23%. Petersburg's cotton industry relied on waterpower since its inception in the 1830s, and by 1860 towns had developed around the Lynch and Callender mills at Ettick and Matoaca and Battersea across the Appomattox river, and the Merchant's Manufacturing Company had another mill at Campbell Bridge near Ettrick. Together those cotton mills constituted approximately a third of that industry in the state. The town also had three water-powered flour mills by 1860, and five iron foundries.

The city became an important industrial center in a mostly agricultural state with few major cities. Starting in 1813, the city paved its streets, which helped attract business. In 1816 the Upper Appomattox Canal Company completed the Upper Appomattox Canal Navigation System to bypass the Appomattox Falls, which facilitated traffic up and down river to Farmville as well as powered cotton and flour mills. Petersburg responded to the silting-up of its Appomattox River port by building the 8 mile long City Point Railroad, which linked the city to City Point on the James River, reachable by larger Chesapeake Bay and Norfolk-bound ships. During the same decade Petersburg became a railroad center. The Virginia and North Carolina legislatures authorized the 65-mile long Petersburg and Weldon Railroad, in 1830 (three years after the first American railway, the B.& O.) and its "Southern depot" began handling (mostly freight) traffic to Weldon, North Carolina in 1833. The Virginia legislature authorized the Richmond and Petersburg Railroad in 1835, and three years later it opened between Petersburg's Pocahontas neighborhood and Richmond's Manchester neighborhood, proving a more convenient and cheaper link than the Manchester Turnpike. The legislature in 1846 chartered Southside Railroad to Farmville and Lynchburg to the west. It would run 124 miles westward and supersede the technologically outdated Upper Appomattox Canal and acquire the Appomattox Railroad in 1854. Petersburg business interests for years managed to block a charter for the last major line, the Norfolk and Petersburg Railroad, which was completed in 1858. It connected Petersburg to the Atlantic Ocean port of Norfolk and would foster more growth in that city than Petersburg itself.

In 1851 the city introduced gaslights and by 1857 installed a new municipal water system. All these civic improvements helped attract and hold a substantial business community, based on manufacture of tobacco products, cotton and flour and banking.

=== American Civil War ===
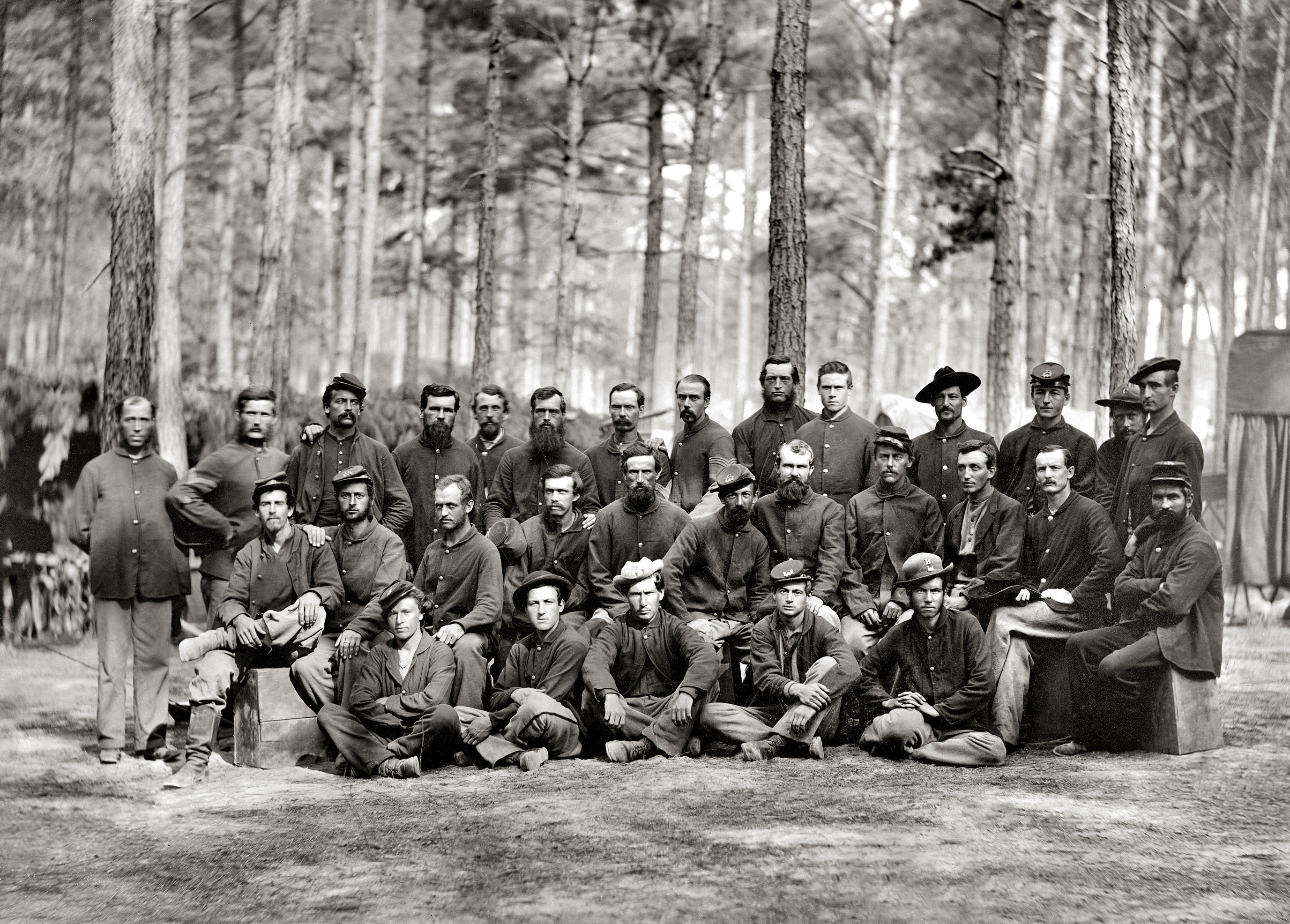
U.S. Engineer Battalion, during the Siege of Petersburg, August 1864

At the time of the American Civil War, Petersburg was the second-largest city in Virginia after the capital, Richmond, and the seventh-largest city in the Confederacy. Petersburg's population had the highest percentage of free black Americans of any city in the Confederacy and the largest number of free blacks in the Mid-Atlantic region.

When the Civil War began in 1861, Petersburg was strategic in supporting the Confederate effort. The city provided several infantry companies and artillery units to the Confederate Army, along with three troops of cavalry. In April 1861 more than 300 free black Americans of Petersburg volunteered to work on the fortifications of Norfolk, Virginia under their own leader. Slaveholders also contributed the labor of numerous black slaves.

==== Siege of Petersburg ====
In 1864, Petersburg became a target during the Overland Campaign of Union General Ulysses S. Grant. Its numerous railroads made the city a lifeline for Richmond, the Confederate capital. After his defeat at the Battle of Cold Harbor, Grant remained east of Richmond, crossed the James River and moved south to Petersburg. Grant intended to cut the rail lines into Petersburg, stopping Richmond's supplies. On June 9, troops led by William F. "Baldy" Smith of the 18th Corps, attacked the Dimmock Line, a series of defensive breastworks constructed to protect Petersburg.

General Robert E. Lee arrived with his Army of Northern Virginia, and the 292-day Siege of Petersburg began. Due to botched Union leadership and arrival of Confederate General William Mahone, the Union forces suffered a disastrous defeat at the Battle of the Crater, suffering over 4,000 casualties. In early April 1865, Union troops finally managed to push their left flank to the railroad to Weldon, North Carolina and the Southside Railroad. With the loss of Petersburg's crucial railroad lines, the Confederate forces had to retreat, ending the siege in a victory for the Union Army. The fall of Petersburg meant that Richmond could no longer be defended. Lee attempted to lead his men south to join up with Confederate forces in North Carolina. Hopelessly outnumbered, he was surrounded and forced to surrender at Appomattox Court House, Virginia, on April 9, 1865.

=== Reconstruction era ===
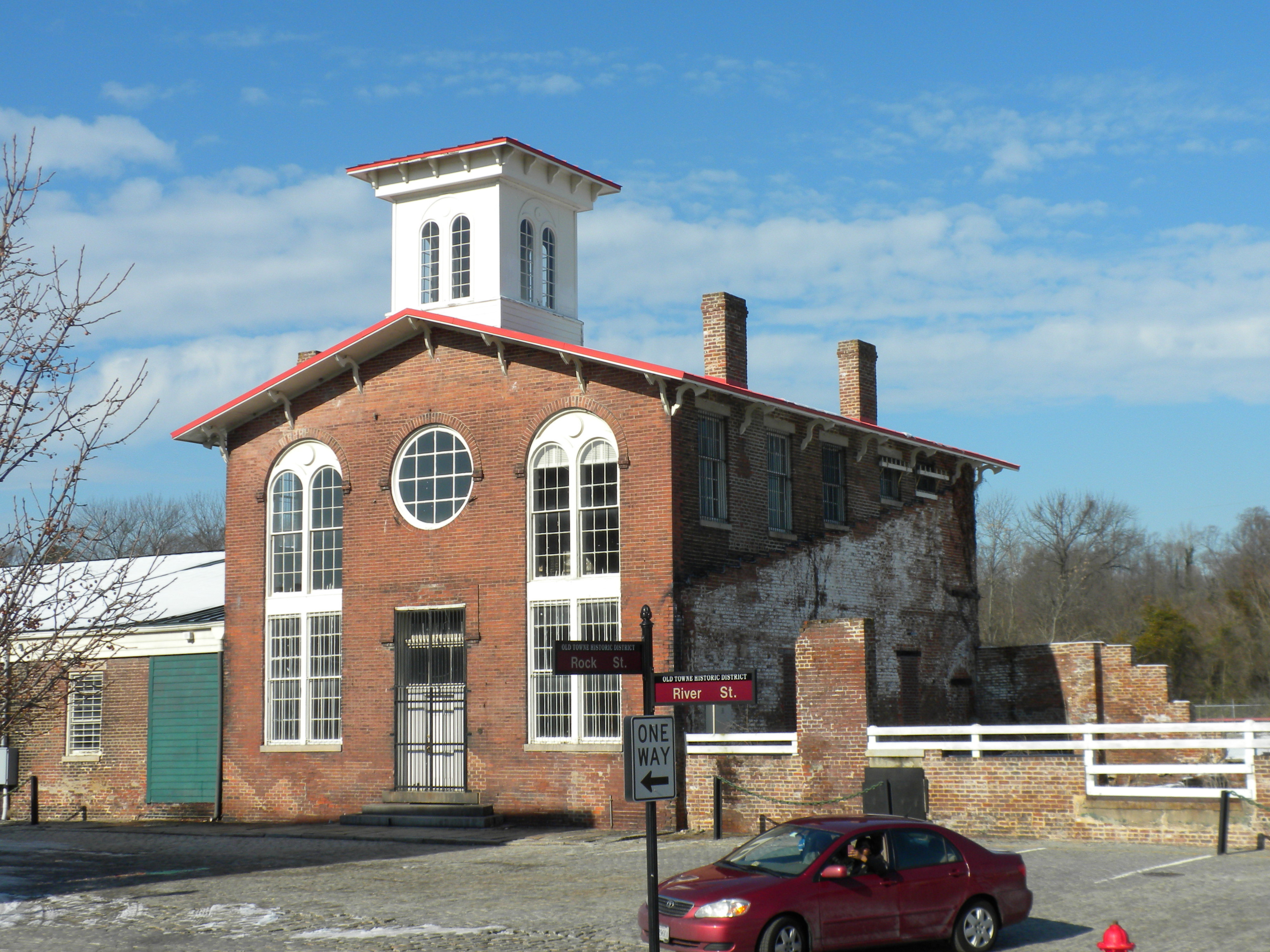
South Side Railroad Depot on Rock Street which served as the office of William Mahone when his Readjustor Party dominated Virginia politics.

In the years after the Civil War, many freedmen migrated to Petersburg, founding numerous churches, businesses and institutions. The Freedmen's Bureau established new facilities for freedmen, including a mental health hospital in December 1869, at Howard's Grove Hospital, a former Confederate unit. The U.S. Federal Government and the railroad companies repaired the damaged railroads to the city. Saint John's Episcopal Church was founded in Petersburg in 1868.

In 1870 the General Assembly incorporated the Central Lunatic Asylum as an organized state institution, as part of an effort by the bi-racial Reconstruction-era legislature to increase public institutions for general welfare. The legislature also founded the state's first system of free public education.

=== Readjuster era ===
During the 1880s, a coalition of black Republicans and white Populists held power for several years in the state legislature. This resulted in two major public institutions in Petersburg, as the legislature invested for education and welfare. In 1882, the legislature founded Virginia State University in nearby Ettrick as Virginia Normal and Collegiate Institute. It was one of the first public (fully state-supported) four-year historically black colleges and universities (HBCU) in the Mid-Atlantic. This was part of a drive to improve public education that started with the Reconstruction legislature. In 1888, its first president, John Mercer Langston, was elected to the US Congress on the Republican ticket, the first black American to be elected to Congress from Virginia.

In 1882, the state legislature also authorized moving the mental asylum facility to the Mayfield Farm and developing a new campus there. This is the site of the present-day Central State Hospital, which provides a variety of mental health services.

In 1894 a fireworks factory exploded killing eleven people.

=== 20th century to present ===
The limitations of Petersburg's small geographic area and proximity to Richmond are structural problems that have hampered it in adapting to major economic changes in the 20th century. Other forces in the mid-20th century, such as industrial and railroad restructuring, reduced the number of jobs in the city. In addition, suburban development attracted people to newer housing outside the city.

World wars led to major federal institutions being constructed near Petersburg, which created local jobs. Soon after World War I started, the US Army established Camp Lee just outside of Petersburg in Prince George County for training draftees. The facility was used again during World War II. In 1950 the camp was designated as Fort Lee, and additional buildings were constructed to house the U.S. Army Quartermaster Corps Center and School.

During WWII Camp Pickett was established west of Petersburg near the small rural town of Blackstone, and the Defense Supply Center, Richmond opened in neighboring Chesterfield. In the postwar period, some of these installations have been reduced in size. In the 1950s, Petersburg became the southern terminus of the Richmond-Petersburg Turnpike, predating the U.S. Interstate Highway System.

Since that time, Petersburg has struggled in competition with nearby Richmond, as the capital has grown to dominate the region in a changing economy as industries restructured.

==== Jim Crow ====
In the late 19th and early 20th century, Virginia's Democratic Party–dominated legislature approved constitutional changes that effectively disenfranchised most blacks and many poor whites. Those disfranchised suffered major losses in the ability to exercise their rights as citizens. The legislature also instituted Jim Crow laws, including imposing racial segregation.

With many black Americans having served the nation and cause of freedom in WWII, in the postwar years they pressed for social justice, an end to segregation, and restoration of voting power.

In 1949 Petersburg businessman and politician, Remmie Arnold, the president and owner of the Arnold Pen Company, at the time one of the largest manufacturers of fountain pens, launched a campaign for Governor of Virginia. As a Petersburg city councilman, Arnold had pushed through a budgetary increase earmarked for equality and fair access for public housing and recreational facilities for everyone, including people of color, and increased budgetary considerations for the black schools in Petersburg. Unusually for a Democratic politician in the Jim Crow South, Arnold promised to "deal with all Virginians fairly", whatever their ethnicity. He was endorsed by Arthur Wergs Mitchell, the first black American to be elected to the United States Congress as a Democrat. Arnold ultimately lost the Democratic primary to John S. Battle, who won the gubernatorial election.

Even after the Great Migration of many blacks to northern jobs and cities, Petersburg was 40 percent black in 1960. Under state segregation and Jim Crow laws, those citizens were barred from free use of public spaces and facilities.

=== Civil Rights Movement ===
Major black churches, such as First Baptist and Gillfield Baptist, formed the moral center of the Civil Rights Movement in Petersburg, which gained strength in mid-century and was a center of action. Dr. Wyatt Tee Walker, the pastor of Gillfield Baptist Church, had become friends with Dr. Martin Luther King Jr. in the early 1950s when they were both in divinity school in New York state. In 1957 they co-founded the Southern Christian Leadership Conference (SCLC), an important force for leadership of the movement in the South. Walker also founded the Petersburg Improvement Association (PIA), modeled on the Montgomery Improvement Association in Alabama. According to Walker and other close associates of King, Petersburg had played an important role, a kind of blueprint for the national civil rights movement.

Beginning in the 1950s black Americans in Petersburg struggled to desegregate public schools and facilities. In 1958 the City Council closed Wilcox Lake, a popular swimming hole in Petersburg to prevent the lake's public recreational area from being racially integrated. It never re-opened to swimming. Through sit-ins in the bus terminal in 1960, the PIA gained agreement by the president of the Bus Terminal Restaurants to desegregate lunch counters in Petersburg and several other cities.

Virginia officials strongly opposed school integration following the 1954 US Supreme Court ruling in Brown v. Board of Education that segregated public schools were unconstitutional. They initiated the program of Massive Resistance. For instance, rather than allow schools to be integrated, then Governor of Virginia, J. Lindsay Almond ordered the schools in several localities including Warren County, Charlottesville and Norfolk, to be closed. The school board of Prince Edward County closed the public schools for five years, starting in 1959. In Petersburg, the Bollingbook School opened in 1958 as a segregation academy for white students.

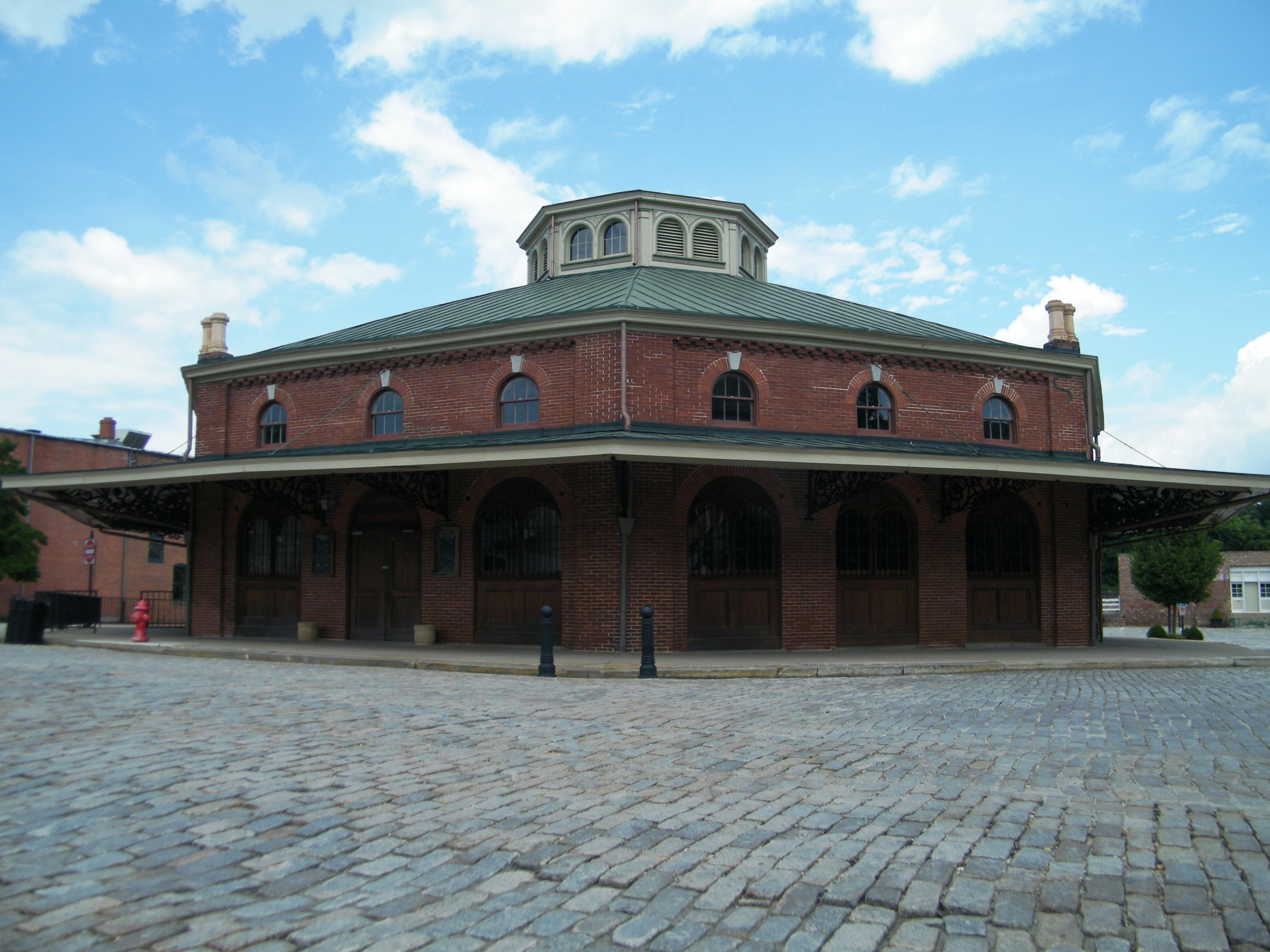
The city market that has been preserved and is still used as a market.

=== Late 20th-century economic decline ===
Retail and industry prospered until about the late 1980s. Petersburg was hit hard in 1985 when tobacco giant Brown & Williamson, the city's largest manufacturer, closed a cigarette factory in town. De-industrialization, restructuring of railroads, and related national structural economic changes cost many jobs in the city, as happened in numerous older industrial cities across the North and Midwest. The post-World War II national construction of highways encouraged development outside cities and suburbanization added to problems. In addition, reacting to racial integration of schools in the 1960s, many middle-class families moved to newer housing in the predominantly white suburbs. They also moved to the Richmond metro area, where the economy was expanding with jobs in new fields of financial and retail services. Some companies shifted industrial jobs to states further south, where wages were lower, or overseas.

The declining economy increased the pressure of competition and racial tensions in Petersburg. These flared from 1968 until 1980, when black members of the City Council accused the white Mayor of racism over a re-districting plan which they and the ACLU alleged was designed to allow whites to maintain white supremacy in the city. For decades, the city government was run by a small group of white businessmen and bankers. Most were wealthy enough to own homes in the exclusive Walnut Hill neighborhood and their interrelated families had been established there for generations. In 1980 one black councilwoman described the Petersburg city government as "our own little version of the Byrd Machine", comparing it to the political organization led by segregationist Democrat, Harry Flood Byrd, that controlled Virginia politics for decades. In 1968, following the April assassination of Martin Luther King Jr., Petersburg was the first city to designate his birthday as a holiday; in 1983 it would be memorialized as the federal Martin Luther King Jr. Day, becoming a true national holiday when South Carolina became the last state to sign the observance into law.

In an attempt to stem its economic decline, in 1971 the city completed steps begun in 1966 to annex 14 square miles of land from adjacent and predominantly white counties of Prince George and Dinwiddie. The annexation had been generally supported by the citizens of Petersburg, black and white alike, since the mid-1960s, as a necessary measure to allow the city to expand its tax base and its potential for growth and development. The city argued to the counties that it was better prepared to provide municipal-type services than the predominantly rural counties and that the city needed more land for expected new development. The annexation was opposed by the county governments, who lost most of their commercial tax base, as well as the residents of the annexed suburban areas.

Following the annexation, blacks realized that the annexations had added 8,000 new white residents. City council members were then elected at-large, requiring majority approval for each seat. Black civil rights organizations challenged the annexations in court, saying these were motivated to illegally dilute the voting power of blacks. A federal judge, citing provisions of the Voting Rights Act of 1965, agreed and ordered the city to be divided into single-member districts, or wards, to enable blacks the opportunity to elect representatives of their choice.

White flight from the annexed suburban neighborhoods began almost immediately. As residents of the city of Petersburg, their children would be required to attend the Petersburg City Schools, which had become predominantly black due to whites sending their children to private schools or moving to suburbs.

Projected industrial development of large tracts of farmland in the annexed areas failed to take place. In 1985 Petersburg again sought to annex more land from Prince George County. This time the nearby City of Hopewell, a city that already had huge amounts of taxable industry within its borders, joined the annexation suit to try to annex commercial areas of Prince George County, including Fort Lee and suburban neighborhoods near the base where many military families live. Many residents of Prince George had relocated to stay within the county after the previous annexation by Petersburg. They were strongly opposed to another attempt by the cities to annex their neighborhoods. The U.S. Department of Defense also expressed strong opposition to the proposed annexation. After five years of litigation, with attorney Richard Cranwell representing Prince George County, the Virginia courts, including the Virginia Supreme Court, unanimously ruled that the cities had not shown that annexation would benefit their cities, nor was it necessary to provide governmental services to Prince George residents.

The prolonged annexation fight contributed to decades of racially tinged hostility between the county and city governments that have had negative impact on regional cooperation. Prince George County is predominantly white while the city of Petersburg is roughly four-fifths black. These strained relationships have slowed regional progress and eroded business confidence, hampering economic development in the region to the present day.

In the late 1980s and early 1990s, numerous remaining retail merchants, including Thalhimers, JCPenney, and Sears Roebuck, left older shopping areas in Petersburg for the new Southpark Mall that opened in 1989 in adjacent, and predominantly white, Colonial Heights. A Miller & Rhoads store in Petersburg closed when the department store chain went out of business in 1990. The Ku Klux Klan had held marches in Colonial Heights. After the new shopping mall opened, blacks led by civil rights activist Curtis W. Harris and the SCLC boycotted Southpark Mall for about five years. The boycott ended after the mayor of Colonial Heights, James McNeer, met with Harris and members of his board to discuss job opportunities for blacks in the mall area. McNeer later became President of Richard Bland College.

In the late 20th century, Petersburg worked to restore historic buildings and attract different kinds of stores and businesses to its historic center. During the 1993 Virginia tornado outbreak, Petersburg was struck by an F4 tornado that swept through the downtown area, seriously damaging a number of restored historic buildings and businesses. The same tornado also touched down in Colonial Heights destroying a Walmart store.

=== 21st century ===
As of 2007, Petersburg has continued to evolve as a small city, and its commercial activities have changed. Downtown Petersburg, known as Old Towne, has had new businesses established in the compact core: these include indie restaurants, bars and coffee shops. The long-abandoned Walnut Mall, which closed in the early 1990s, has been demolished. The Army has expanded activities at nearby Fort Gregg-Adams, home of the United States Army's Sustainment Center of Excellence. The Army's Logistics Branch, Ordnance, Quartermaster, and the Transportation Corps moved there from Fort Eustis following the round of Base Realignment and Closure actions in 2005.

In 2016, Petersburg faced the prospect of large cuts to public services after a state audit found a $12 million (~$15.3 million in 2024) budget shortfall and the prospect of insolvency by the end of the year.

On August 22, 2022, the City of Petersburg and The Commonwealth of Virginia cooperated to form "Partnership for Petersburg", aiming to fix education, public safety, health, and transportation problems. With the support of Virginia Governor Glenn Youngkin and Petersburg Mayor Sam Parham, the initiative includes 42 sub-initiatives involving 61 organizations, including local businesses, state and local law enforcement, local schools, universities, and colleges.

== Geography ==
Petersburg is located at 37°12′46″N 77°24′1″W (37.21295, -77.400417).

According to the United States Census Bureau, the city has a total area of 23.2 square miles (60.1 km^{2}), of which 22.9 square miles (59.3 km^{2}) of land and 0.2 square miles (0.5 km^{2}) (1.1%) is water.

Petersburg is located on the Appomattox River at the fall line, which marks the area where the Piedmont region (continental bedrock) and the Atlantic coastal plain (unconsolidated sediments) meet. The fall line is typically prominent where a river crosses its rocky boundary, as there are rapids or waterfalls. River boats could not travel any farther inland, making the location the head of navigation. The need of a port and abundant supply of waterpower causes settlements to develop where a river crosses the fall line.

Located along the Eastern Seaboard, approximately halfway between New York and Georgia, Petersburg is 21 miles (34 km) south of Virginia's state capital, Richmond, and is at the juncture of Interstates 95 and 85. The city is one of 13 jurisdictions that comprise the Richmond-Petersburg Metropolitan Statistical Area (MSA).

The U.S. Bureau of Economic Analysis combines the city of Petersburg with the cities of Colonial Heights and Hopewell, and neighboring Dinwiddie and Prince George counties for statistical purposes. Petersburg is also a part of the Tri-Cities regional economy known as the "Appomattox Basin", which includes a portion of southeastern Chesterfield County.

Petersburg is located 21.69 miles south of Richmond, Virginia, 38.24 miles north of Emporia, Virginia, 66.83 miles northwest of Norfolk, Virginia, 91.68 miles north of Rocky Mount, North Carolina, and 118.99 miles northeast of Durham, North Carolina.

=== Climate ===
Climate data for PETERSBURG, VA, 1991-2020 normals
Month	Jan	Feb	Mar	Apr	May	Jun	Jul	Aug	Sep	Oct	Nov	Dec	Year
Mean daily maximum °F (°C)	49.1 (9.5)	52.2 (11.2)	60.1 (15.6)	70.4 (21.3)	78.2 (25.7)	85.5 (29.7)	89.3 (31.8)	87.4 (30.8)	81.5 (27.5)	71.6 (22.0)	61.5 (16.4)	52.6 (11.4)	70.0 (21.1)
Daily mean °F (°C)	38.7 (3.7)	40.7 (4.8)	48.1 (8.9)	58.0 (14.4)	66.6 (19.2)	74.8 (23.8)	79.2 (26.2)	77.4 (25.2)	71.1 (21.7)	59.8 (15.4)	49.4 (9.7)	41.6 (5.3)	58.8 (14.9)
Mean daily minimum °F (°C)	28.3 (−2.1)	29.1 (−1.6)	36.1 (2.3)	45.6 (7.6)	55.0 (12.8)	64.2 (17.9)	69.0 (20.6)	67.3 (19.6)	60.8 (16.0)	48.0 (8.9)	37.3 (2.9)	30.6 (−0.8)	47.6 (8.7)
Average precipitation inches (mm)	3.02 (77)	2.70 (69)	4.37 (111)	3.62 (92)	4.37 (111)	4.23 (107)	4.70 (119)	5.31 (135)	4.63 (118)	3.41 (87)	3.16 (80)	3.47 (88)	46.99 (1,194)
Average precipitation days (≥ 0.01 in)	9.3	8.9	9.8	10.6	11.6	10.0	9.2	10.4	8.3	8.6	8.7	9.8	115.2
Source: NOAA

=== Adjacent counties/independent city ===
- Chesterfield County, Virginia—north
- Colonial Heights, Virginia—north
- Dinwiddie County, Virginia—west, south
- Prince George County, Virginia—east, southeast

=== National protected area ===
- Petersburg National Battlefield Park (part)

== Demographics ==
Historical population
Census	Pop.	Note	%±
1790	2,828		—
1800	3,521		24.5%
1810	5,668		61.0%
1820	6,690		18.0%
1830	8,322		24.4%
1840	11,136		33.8%
1850	13,950		25.3%
1860	18,266		30.9%
1870	18,950		3.7%
1880	21,656		14.3%
1890	22,680		4.7%
1900	21,810		−3.8%
1910	24,127		10.6%
1920	31,012		28.5%
1930	28,564		−7.9%
1940	30,631		7.2%
1950	35,054		14.4%
1960	36,750		4.8%
1970	36,103		−1.8%
1980	41,055		13.7%
1990	38,386		−6.5%
2000	33,740		−12.1%
2010	32,420		−3.9%
2020	33,458		3.2%
2025 (est.)	33,734	▲	0.8%
U.S. Decennial Census; 1790–1960 1900–1990; 1990–2000 2010–2012

=== Racial and ethnic composition ===
Petersburg city, Virginia – Racial and ethnic composition Note: the US Census treats Hispanic/Latino as an ethnic category. This table excludes Latinos from the racial categories and assigns them to a separate category. Hispanics/Latinos may be of any race.
Race / Ethnicity (NH = Non-Hispanic)	Pop 1980	Pop 1990	Pop 2000	Pop 2010	Pop 2020	% 1980	% 1990	% 2000	% 2010	% 2020
White alone (NH)	15,272	10,051	6,131	4,902	5,178	37.20%	26.18%	18.17%	15.12%	15.48%
Black or African American alone (NH)	24,876	27,502	26,511	25,419	24,530	60.59%	71.65%	78.57%	78.41%	73.32%
Native American or Alaska Native alone (NH)	45	80	61	87	105	0.11%	0.21%	0.18%	0.27%	0.31%
Asian alone (NH)	309	261	234	263	330	0.75%	0.68%	0.69%	0.81%	0.99%
Native Hawaiian or Pacific Islander alone (NH)	x	x	8	12	30	x	x	0.02%	0.04%	0.09%
Other race alone (NH)	91	20	28	31	190	0.22%	0.05%	0.08%	0.10%	0.57%
Mixed race or Multiracial (NH)	x	x	304	490	1,125	x	x	0.90%	1.51%	3.36%
Hispanic or Latino (any race)	462	472	463	1,216	1,970	1.13%	1.23%	1.37%	3.75%	5.89%
Total	41,055	38,386	33,740	32,420	33,458	100.00%	100.00%	100.00%	100.00%	100.00%

=== 2020 census ===
As of the 2020 census, Petersburg had a population of 33,458. The median age was 39.6 years. 19.1% of residents were under the age of 18 and 17.7% of residents were 65 years of age or older. For every 100 females there were 86.6 males, and for every 100 females age 18 and over there were 83.0 males age 18 and over.

97.3% of residents lived in urban areas, while 2.7% lived in rural areas.

There were 15,382 households in Petersburg, of which 23.5% had children under the age of 18 living in them. Of all households, 20.7% were married-couple households, 26.3% were households with a male householder and no spouse or partner present, and 45.1% were households with a female householder and no spouse or partner present. About 40.9% of all households were made up of individuals and 13.1% had someone living alone who was 65 years of age or older.

There were 18,013 housing units, of which 14.6% were vacant. The homeowner vacancy rate was 3.4% and the rental vacancy rate was 9.7%.

Racial composition as of the 2020 census
Race	Number	Percent
White	5,418	16.2%
Black or African American	24,811	74.2%
American Indian and Alaska Native	141	0.4%
Asian	339	1.0%
Native Hawaiian and Other Pacific Islander	32	0.1%
Some other race	1,142	3.4%
Two or more races	1,575	4.7%
Hispanic or Latino (of any race)	1,970	5.9%

=== 2010 census ===
As of the 2010 United States census, there were 32,420 people living in the city. 79.1% were Black or African American, 16.1% White, 0.8% Asian, 0.3% Native American, 0.1% Pacific Islander, 1.8% of some other race and 1.8% of two or more races. 3.8% were Hispanic or Latino (of any race).

=== 2000 census ===
As of the census of 2000, there were 33,740 people, 13,799 households, and 8,513 families living in the city. The population density was 1,474.6 people per square mile (569.3 people/km^{2}). There were 15,955 housing units at an average density of 697.3 units per square mile (269.2 units/km^{2}). The racial makeup of the city was 79.00% African American, 18.5% White, 0.20% Native American, 0.70% Asian, 0.03% Pacific Islander, 0.59% from other races, and 1.00% from two or more races. Hispanics or Latinos of any race were 1.37% of the population.

There were 13,799 households, out of which 27.6% had children under the age of 18 living with them, 30.1% were married couples living together, 26.1% had a female householder with no husband present, and 38.3% were non-families. 32.2% of all households were made up of individuals, and 11.7% had someone living alone who was 65 years of age or older. The average household size was 2.38 and the average family size was 2.98.

The age distribution was 25.1% under 18, 8.9% from 18 to 24, 27.5% from 25 to 44, 22.9% from 45 to 64, and 15.6% who were 65 or older. The median age was 37 years. For every 100 females, there were 84.2 males. For every 100 females aged 18 and over, there were 78.7 males.

The median income for a household in the city was $33,927, and the median income for a family was $40,300. Males had a median income of $30,295 versus $23,246 for females. The per capita income for the city was $18,535. About 22.4% of families and 27.5% of the population were below the poverty line, including 27.1% of those under age 18 and 15.8% of those age 65 or over.

== Government and politics ==
United States presidential election results for Petersburg, Virginia
Year	Republican		Democratic		Third party(ies)	
Year	No.	%	No.	%	No.	%
1880	1,614	47.67%	1,771	52.30%	1	0.03%
1884	2,765	63.17%	1,612	36.83%	0	0.00%
1888	2,198	51.54%	2,067	48.46%	0	0.00%
1892	1,046	29.01%	2,558	70.94%	2	0.06%
1896	766	30.21%	1,682	66.32%	88	3.47%
1900	688	30.02%	1,589	69.33%	15	0.65%
1904	144	13.40%	924	85.95%	7	0.65%
1908	205	18.39%	905	81.17%	5	0.45%
1912	75	6.03%	1,122	90.19%	47	3.78%
1916	161	12.13%	1,155	87.04%	11	0.83%
1920	485	18.90%	2,072	80.75%	9	0.35%
1924	228	14.29%	1,331	83.45%	36	2.26%
1928	909	39.73%	1,379	60.27%	0	0.00%
1932	490	20.08%	1,920	78.69%	30	1.23%
1936	444	16.75%	2,192	82.69%	15	0.57%
1940	604	21.46%	2,193	77.90%	18	0.64%
1944	719	24.12%	2,256	75.68%	6	0.20%
1948	1,189	31.04%	2,019	52.70%	623	16.26%
1952	2,822	54.49%	2,342	45.22%	15	0.29%
1956	3,166	58.10%	1,882	34.54%	401	7.36%
1960	2,820	48.60%	2,950	50.84%	33	0.57%
1964	3,253	41.84%	4,521	58.15%	1	0.01%
1968	3,478	31.14%	5,519	49.41%	2,172	19.45%
1972	6,710	55.67%	5,156	42.78%	187	1.55%
1976	5,041	38.53%	7,852	60.02%	189	1.44%
1980	5,001	37.67%	7,931	59.73%	345	2.60%
1984	5,753	38.17%	9,248	61.35%	73	0.48%
1988	4,231	33.60%	8,177	64.94%	183	1.45%
1992	3,125	24.57%	8,671	68.18%	921	7.24%
1996	2,261	20.76%	8,105	74.43%	524	4.81%
2000	2,109	19.07%	8,751	79.11%	202	1.83%
2004	2,238	18.73%	9,682	81.03%	29	0.24%
2008	1,583	10.19%	13,774	88.64%	183	1.18%
2012	1,527	9.60%	14,283	89.79%	98	0.62%
2016	1,451	10.53%	12,021	87.20%	314	2.28%
2020	1,584	11.22%	12,389	87.75%	145	1.03%
2024	1,702	12.97%	11,219	85.52%	198	1.51%

=== Federal representation ===
Petersburg is represented in the U.S. Senate by Democrats Tim Kaine and Mark Warner and is located within Virginia's 4th congressional district, represented by Democrat Jennifer McClellan.

=== State representation ===
Petersburg is located within the 13th district of the Virginia Senate, represented by Democrat Lashrecse Aird, and within the 82nd district of the Virginia House of Delegates, represented by Republican Kim Taylor.

=== City government ===
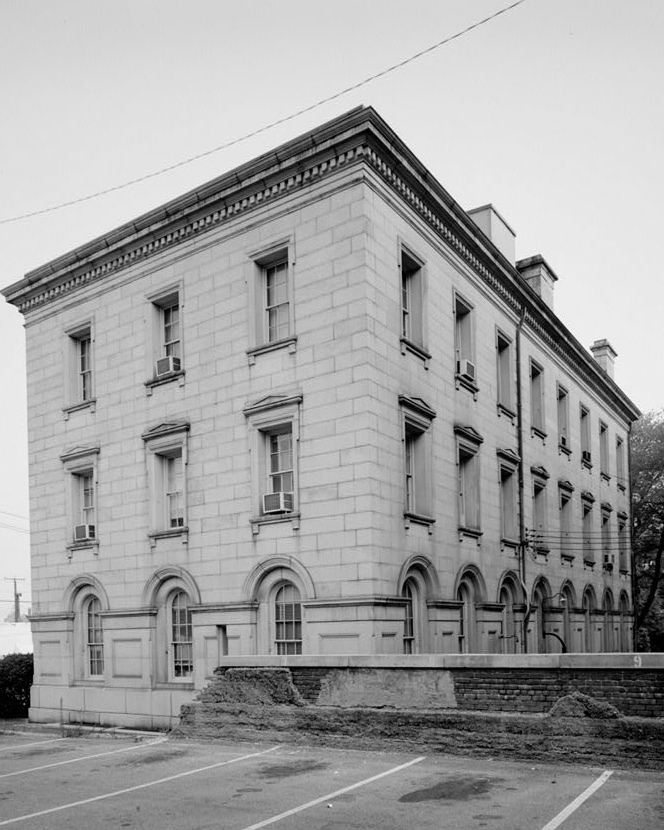
The former U.S. Customs House, now serving as the Petersburg City Hall

The city of Petersburg has a council-manager form of city government. One member is elected to the council from each of the city's seven wards, or single-member districts. The city council then hires a city manager.

The city council elects one of its members to serve as mayor and one member to serve as vice mayor, but generally those positions have the authority only of being chair and vice chair of the city council.

The members of city council:

- Ward One: Marlow Jones
- Ward Two: Darrin Hill
- Ward Three: Samuel Parham (Mayor)
- Ward Four: Charlie Cuthbert
- Ward Five: W. Howard Myers
- Ward Six: Annette Smith-Lee
- Ward Seven: Arnold Westbrook Jr.

== Economy ==
Arnold Pen Co., Seward Trunk Co., Titmus Optical, and Amsted Rail-Brenco bearings operate in Petersburg. The city has a long history as an industrial center for Virginia. It was home to many tobacco companies, including tobacco giant Brown & Williamson. The Southern Chemical Co., the original maker of Fleets Phoso-soda (used in hospitals worldwide), was a well-known brand associated with the town. In the early 1990s the retailer Walmart opened a large distribution center just west of town in neighboring Dinwiddie County. In September 2012, the online retailer Amazon also opened a fulfilment center in neighboring Dinwiddie County. This brought hundreds of new jobs to the area.

== Media ==
Petersburg was home to The Daily Express and The Weekly Express newspaper from 1862 to 1869. It was succeeded by The Daily Courier.

== Transportation ==
As noted above, Petersburg is on the CSX and Norfolk Southern rail lines. These lines host Amtrak train services; the Petersburg station is located in Ettrick, Virginia. There is a bus station with Greyhound desk. A Greater Richmond Transit Company bus between Petersburg and downtown Richmond is active. Richmond International Airport, located less than 30 miles (48 km) north of city, serves passengers from the city. Also close by is Chesterfield County Airport, and the Dinwiddie County Airport lies a few miles west of the city. Interstate highway I-95 forks with I-85, with the latter highway ending here; these two highways also make up the former routing of the tolled Richmond-Petersburg Turnpike that was decommissioned in 1992. The south end of I-295 lies to the south of the city. Petersburg Area Transit serves the mass transit needs of the city and the Tri-Cities.

=== Major highways ===
- I-85
- I-95
- US 1
- US 301
- US 301 Alt.
- US 460
- US 460 Bus.
- SR 36

== Culture ==
=== Architecture and arts ===
- Petersburg Old Town Historic District
- U.S. National Register of Historic Places
- U.S. Historic district
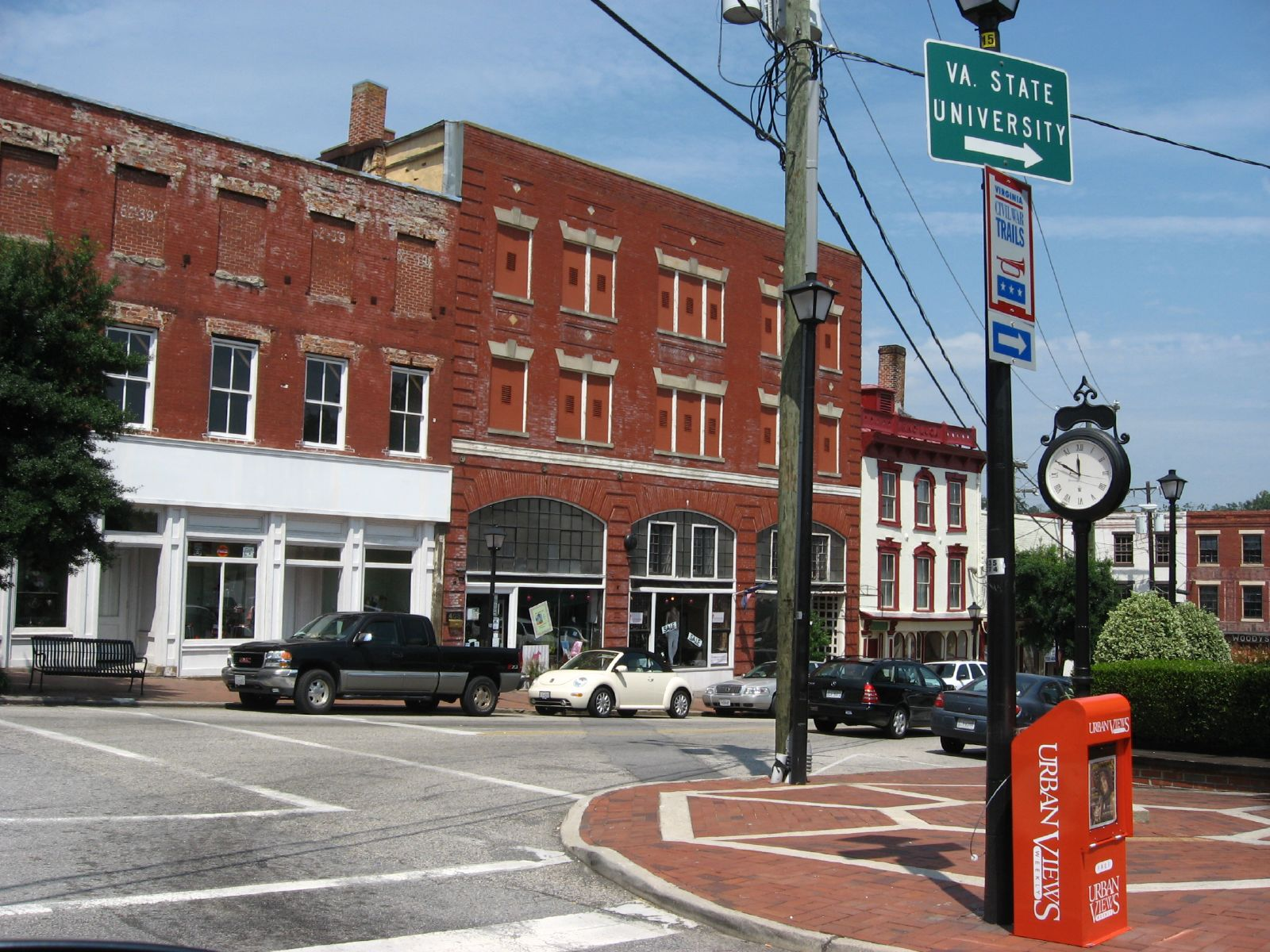
- Intersection of Sycamore and Bollingbrook

- Location within Virginia Location within the United States
- Location: U.S. 1 and VA 36, Petersburg, Virginia
- Area: 190 acres (77 ha)
- Architect: Multiple
- NRHP reference No.: 80004314
- Added to NRHP: July 4, 1980

Since the departure of the tobacco company Brown & Williamson, Petersburg has invested heavily in historic preservation of its rich range of architecture. The city's numerous 18th-, 19th- and 20th-century structures in its historic neighborhoods provide unique character of place. Groups such as Historic Petersburg Foundation and Association for the Preservation of Virginia Antiquities have worked to restore many of the city's buildings and recognized important districts.

The Petersburg Old Town Historic District is listed on the National Register of Historic Places, as are other historic districts. People appreciate the preserved historic buildings and pedestrian scale of the downtown, as well as their architectural variety. The buildings are being adapted for new uses. Many restaurants, specialty shops, and up-scale apartments and condos have been developed, with more underway. Southern Living magazine featured this area, as did HGTV's What You Get For The Money.

The area has become a vibrant arts center. It has an Arts League and a performing arts center, Sycamore Rouge, "Petersburg's Professional Theatre for the Community". Sycamore Rouge produces a five-show mainstage theatre season and a "black box" theatre season, supplemented with live music and cabaret performances. The city celebrates a "Friday of the Arts" on the second Friday of each month, in which many locations feature local artwork and live music.

Numerous historic properties and districts are associated with the downtown area. Pocahontas Island, a historically black community, is listed as a historic district on the National Register. Among the city's most architecturally refined properties is Battersea, a Palladian-style house built in 1767–1768. On the city's western edge above the Appomattox River, the house is situated on 37 acres (150,000 m^{2}). It is listed on the National Register of Historic Places. A non-profit group is working with the city to develop a long-term plan for the property.

=== Sports ===
Petersburg was home to the Petersburg Goobers and numerous minor league baseball teams playing in the Virginia League between 1885 and 1951. Petersburg teams played 29 seasons in the Virginia League and the 1954 Piedmont League. Petersburg was an affiliate of the St. Louis Cardinals (1923) and Cincinnati Reds (1954).

Baseball Hall of Fame member Sam Rice played for the 1914–1915 Petersburg Goobers.

Petersburg was home to the Petersburg Generals of the Coastal Plain League, a collegiate summer baseball league. The Generals played at the Petersburg Sports Complex. The Generals began play in 2000 and won a league championship in their inaugural season.

== Education ==
=== Petersburg City Public Schools ===
History of Schools in Petersburg can be found in the History portion of the article.

High school

- Petersburg High School

Middle school

- Vernon Johns Middle School (former Anderson Elementary building)

Elementary schools

- Cool Springs Elementary School (formerly A.P. Hill Elementary)
- Lakemont Elementary School (formerly Robert E. Lee Elementary)
- Walnut Hill Elementary School
- Blandford Academy K-5
- Pleasants Lane Elementary School (formerly J.E.B Stuart Elementary)
- Westview Early Childhood Education Center

Schools closed, several buildings re-tasked

- David Anderson Elementary School (converted to a middle school)
- Virginia Avenue Elementary School (closed in 2005)
- Westview Elementary (reduced to Head Start and early childhood education)
- Peabody Middle School (closed July 1, 2017)

=== Other schools ===
Charter/tech

- Appomattox Regional Governor's School for the Arts and Technology
- Maggie L. Walker Governor's School for Government and International Studies

Independent schools in the Petersburg area currently include:

- Bermuda Run Educational Center
- Blandford Manor Education Center
- Grace Baptist School
- Restoration Military Academy
- Rock Church Academy
- Robert A. Lewis SDA School
- St. Joseph School [This private school is accredited by the Virginia Board of Education and by the Southern Association of Colleges and Schools.]

=== Higher education ===
The area is served by three schools of higher education:

- Brightpoint Community College
- Richard Bland College
- Virginia State University

== Climate ==
The climate in this area is characterized by hot, humid summers and generally mild to cool winters. According to the Köppen Climate Classification system, Petersburg has a humid subtropical climate, abbreviated "Cfa" on climate maps.

== Crime ==
In 2020, the city had 24 homicides, giving a homicide rate of 76.5 homicides per 100,000 people, the second highest in the United States.

== Notable people ==
- Victoria Gray Adams, first black woman to run for U. S. Senate from Mississippi, as well as co-chair with Fannie Lou Hamer in founding the Mississippi Freedom Democratic Party, lived here near the end of her life.
- Eliza Allen, African American activist, clubwoman, and banker
- Louis B. Anderson Chicago City Council member, was born here
- Jacob M. Appel, author (Einstein's Beach House), bioethicist.
- Charles M. Beckwith (1851–1928), Episcopal prelate who served as the fourth Bishop of Alabama, was born here.
- Tyra Bolling, R&B singer, was born here.
- Joseph Cotten, actor, was born and raised here.
- Harold Cruse (1916–2005), social critic and teacher of black American studies, was born here.
- Edith Luckett Davis, actress and mother of future First Lady Nancy Reagan, was born here.
- Eliza Ann Dupuy (c. 1814 – 1880), author
- William Henry Evans, Wisconsin lawyer and legislator, was born here.
- Shalita Grant, Tony Award-nominated actress and actress on shows such as NCIS: New Orleans, You, and Search Party
- Delores Ann Richburg Greene, college dean in Virginia
- Otelia Shields Howard (1900–1945), English professor at Virginia State College
- Ricky Hunley, NFL defensive player, was born here.
- Vernon Johns, civil rights leader.
- Rudi Johnson (1979–2025), former NFL running back.
- John Mercer Langston (1829–1899), abolitionist, activist, educator and politician: first dean of Howard University law school, first president of Virginia State University, in 1888 the first black elected United States Congress from Virginia; lived here.
- Kendall Langford, NFL defensive player, Miami Dolphins and St. Louis Rams, born and raised here
- Francis Rives Lassiter, U.S. congressman
- William Lassiter, U.S. Army major general
- Nellie A. Ramsey Leslie (c. 1840s-c. 1920s), black American musician, teacher and composer, was born here into slavery. (Note: Another source says that she was born in Amelia County, Virginia.)
- William Mahone, 19th-century railroad builder, Confederate General (hero of the Battle of the Crater), and politician; the mayor of Petersburg, where he and his wife Otelia Butler Mahone made their home for many years.
- Frank Mason III, former Naismith college basketball player of the year and NBA point guard for the Sacramento Kings
- Moses Malone, NBA Hall of Fame player, born here and won state basketball championships at Petersburg High School.
- Jennifer McClellan, U.S. representative for Virginia
- Jerome Myers, writer and artist of the Ashcan school of painting.
- Afemo Omilami, actor in the films Drumline, Forrest Gump, and Glory, born and raised here.
- DJ Pryor, stand-up comedian and actor
- Dee Dee Ramone, punk rocker, born at Ft. Lee Army base.
- John M Richardson, Admiral, Recipient of Legion of Merit and Order of Naval Merit
- Joseph Jenkins Roberts, first president of Liberia, lived for a time in Petersburg.
- Shyyell Diamond Sanchez-McCray, drag performer and activist
- Winfield Scott, U.S. Army general, diplomat, and presidential candidate, was born nearby in Dinwiddie County and spent much time in Petersburg in his youth.
- Norman Sisisky, U.S. Representative from Virginia's 4th Congressional district from 1983 to 2001.
- Ricky Smith, general manager of the Houston Texans football team, was born here.
- Trey Songz, R&B singer born here
- Harry Sydney, former USFL & NFL running back was born here.
- Morton Traylor, artist, was born here.
- Wyatt T. Walker, pastor of Gillfield Baptist Church here, executive director of SCLC.
- Tico Wells, actor, The Cosby Show and "Five Heart Beats" (choir boy), family is from here.
- Mark West, NBA player, was raised here.
- Blair Underwood, actor born here

== See also ==
- Petersburg (Amtrak station)
- National Register of Historic Places listings in Petersburg, Virginia
