= Petersburg High School (Virginia) =

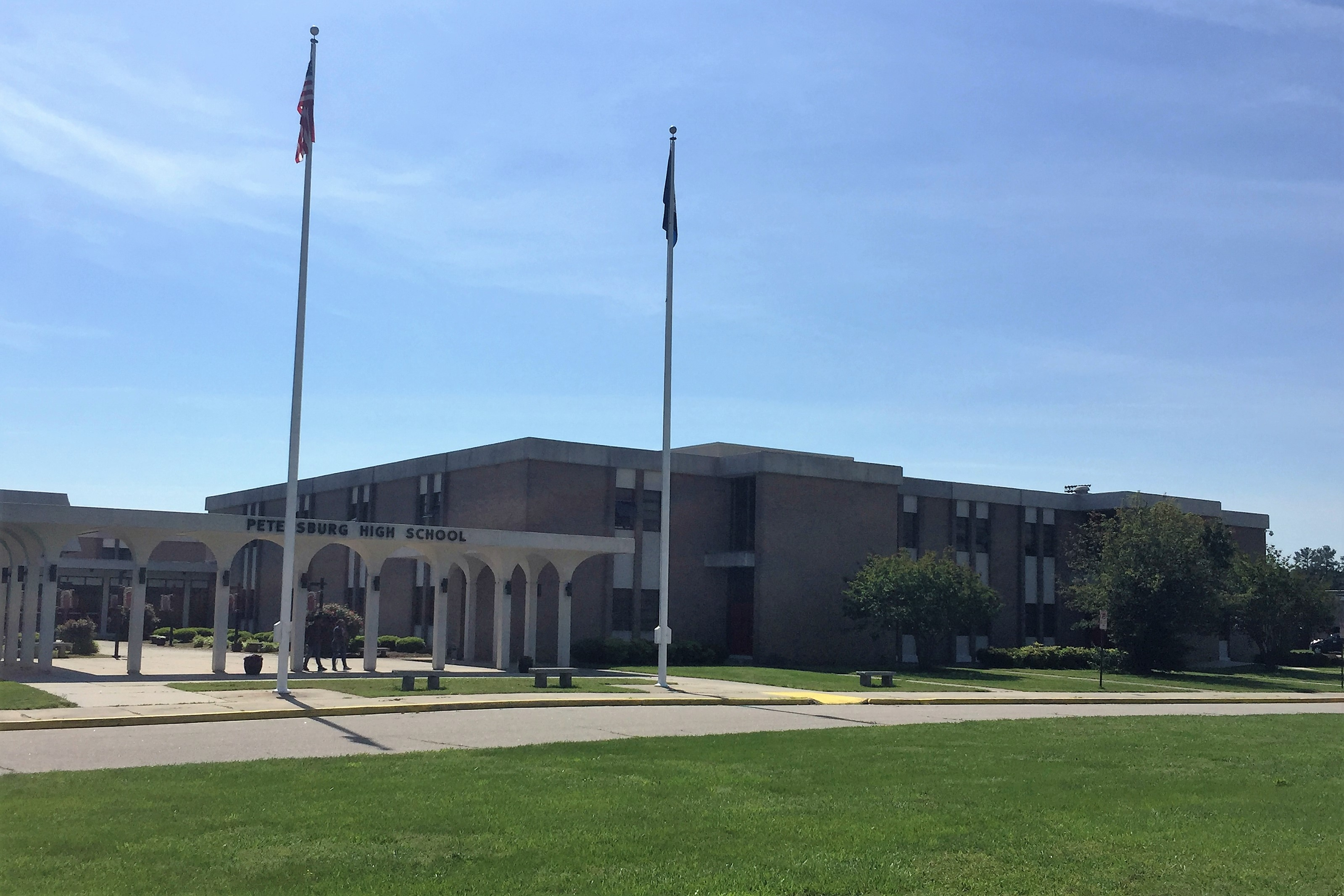

Location
- 3101 Johnson Road; Petersburg, Virginia 23805

Information
- School type: Public
- Founded: 1974; 52 years ago (in current location)
- Locale: Rural, Fringe
- School district: Petersburg City Public Schools
- NCES District ID: 5102910
- Superintendent: Dr. John Farrelly
- NCES School ID: 510291001198
- Principal: Alicia L. Fields
- Teaching staff: 76.00 (on an FTE basis)
- Grades: 9–12
- Enrollment: 1,215 (2024–25)
- Student to teacher ratio: 15.99
- Language: English
- Colors: Crimson and gold
- Nickname: Crimson Wave
- Athletic Conference: Central District; Central Region
- Website: high.petersburg.k12.va.us

Petersburg High School is located in Petersburg, Virginia, United States. It is the only high school in Petersburg City Public Schools.

Petersburg High School is located on Johnson Road. The new school combined the old Petersburg High School on Washington Street (currently the Appomattox Regional Governor's School) and the old Peabody High School (currently Peabody Middle School) on Wesley Street.

Petersburg High School opened the Johnson Road location on September 3, 1974. The campus style architecture of the facility was divided into four wings by architect Gordon B. Galusha. The William W. Lawson, Jr. Gymnasium, which extends east of the main building, was named after the title-winning basketball coach, the late William H. Lawson, Jr. It has one full-sized basketball court and seats approximately 3,000 fans. The auditorium is located in the main building and seats 924 with 532 plush red-cushioned seats located in the orchestra. Seating in the rear of the auditorium includes desk-top seats The band and choral rooms include built in risers and an individual sound studio for instrumental music students. The cafeteria, adjacent to the auditorium, is centrally located to provide easy access by all wings.

== Notable alumni ==
- Tyra Bolling – R&B artist
- Mark Buckley – ATP tennis player
- Ricky Hunley (1980) – retired NFL player
- Kendall Langford (2004) – NFL player
- Moses Malone (1974) – retired NBA player
- Frank Mason (2012) – NBA player
- Jerome Mathis (2001) – NFL/AFL player
- Trey Songz (2002) – R&B artist
- Quinton Spain (2010) – NFL player
- Blair Underwood (1982) – actor
- Mark West – retired NBA player
- Avis Wyatt – professional Euro-League Basketball player
