= Petersburg City Public Schools =

School district in Virginia, United States

- 255 South Boulevard East Petersburg, Virginia, 23805

District information
- Grades: PK–12
- Superintendent: Yolonda Brown
- Schools: 7
- NCES District ID: 5102910

Students and staff
- Students: 4,582 (2024–25)
- Teachers: 316.00 (on an FTE basis)
- Student–teacher ratio: 14.50

Other information
- Website: www.petersburg.k12.va.us

Petersburg City Public Schools is the public school system in the independent city of Petersburg, Virginia. The district is led by superintendent Yolonda Brown.

== Schools ==
=== Elementary Schools ===
- Cool Spring Elementary School (formerly A. P. Hill Elementary School)
- Lakemont Elementary School (formerly Robert E. Lee Elementary School)
- Pleasants Lane Elementary School (formerly J. E. B. Stuart Elementary School)
- Walnut Hill Elementary School

=== Middle Schools ===
- Vernon Johns Middle School

=== High Schools ===
- Petersburg High School

=== Other facilities ===
- Blandford Learning Academy (Alternative)
- Westview Early Childhood Education Center (Pre-K and Headstart)
