= United States Army Logistics Management College =

The United States Army Logistics Management College (ALMC) is a forerunner of the Army Sustainment University (ASU) located at Fort Gregg-Adams, Virginia. ASU is a subordinate school of the United States Army Combined Arms Support Command.

The Army Logistics Management College's role was to develop and present quality education programs in logistics science, management science, and acquisition management to personnel of the Department of Defense, other Federal agencies, and foreign governments. In addition, ALMC offered research and consulting services that contributed to materiel readiness and improvement in acquisition and logistics management.

== History ==
=== Army Logistics Management Center (1954-1987) ===
The origin of ALMC was a 12-week Army Supply Management Course established on 1 July 1954 at Fort Lee, Virginia (now Fort Gregg-Adams). The course was established as a Class II Activity of the Quartermaster General, but with direct control exercised by the Deputy Chief of Staff for Logistics (DCSLOG) at the Department of the Army (DA) level.

On 1 May 1956, the U.S. Army Logistics Management Center (ALMC) was established under the operational control of the Department of the Army Deputy Chief of Staff for Logistics. Shortly thereafter, five new functional courses in management of requirements, procurement, distribution, maintenance, and property disposal were added to the curriculum. In September 1956, the ALMC curriculum expanded again to include correspondence courses and use of accredited instructors in off-campus modes. In September 1958, logistics research and doctrine were added as part of the mission of ALMC.

On 1 August 1962, ALMC was placed under the command of the U.S. Army Materiel Command (AMC). Under AMC, new emphasis was placed on instruction in management of research and development, acquisition management, and on integration of all phases of the life cycle of materiel.

In September 1969, ALMC started the bi-monthly publication of Army Logistician magazine as the official magazine for Army logistics. Its mission was to publish timely, authoritative information on Army and defense logistics plans, programs, policies, operations, procedures, and doctrine for the benefit of all Army personnel, provide a medium for disseminating and exchanging logistics news and information, and create a forum for Soldiers and DA civilians to express original, creative, and innovative ideas about logistics support. In the Summer of 2009, Army Logistician transitioned on its 40th anniversary issue into the Army Sustainment Magazine, continuing its tradition as a much sought-after professional bulletin for logisticians and sustainers around the world.

On 21 July 1970, a new four-story brick academic building called Bunker Hall was dedicated on Fort Lee and became the center of ALMC.

In March 1973, the Department of the Army approved establishment of two cooperative degree programs between ALMC and the Florida Institute of Technology. These cooperative programs use the instruction received during military programs to award transfer credit towards a Masters degree in logistics.

=== Army Logistics Management College (1987-2009) ===
In August 1987, ALMC was redesignated as the U.S. Army Logistics Management College. ALMC offered courses in logistics leader development, acquisition management, integrated logistics support planning, materiel management, disposal operations management, installation logistics management, environmental management, hazardous materials handling, financial management, decision risk analysis, and quantitative analytical techniques.

On 1 October 1991, ALMC was transferred under the newly established U.S. Army Combined Arms Support Command based at Fort Gregg-Adams (formerly Fort Lee), VA.

In June 1992, ALMC began a program to prepare Captains and First Lieutenants in the Ordnance, Quartermaster, Transportation, Aviation, and Medical branches, to become Company Commanders and staff positions in multifunctional logistics and sustainment battalions. Renamed the Combined Logistics Captains Career Course (CLC3) in March 1999, CLC3 became ALMC's premiere course.

On 1 August 1992, ALMC became an affiliate of the Defense Acquisition University (DAU), a consortium of schools established to raise the level of professionalism in the Department of Defense acquisition workforce.

In September 2002, ALMC received formal accreditation as a non-degree-granting occupational education institution, recognized by the U.S. Department of Education.

ALMC graduated over 30,200 students in Fiscal Year 2002.

In January 2006, the U.S. Army Command and General Staff College (CGSC) established a permanent teaching team at ALMC. The first class of sixty-one students graduated on 19 April 2006.

On 2 July 2009, Army Logistics Management College became the Army Logistics University with the dedication of ALU's new $100 million university campus.This change was brought by as part of the restructuring of the U.S. Army Training and Doctrine Command's (TRADOC) school system, the concurrent 2005 Base and Realignment (BRAC) decision to move the U.S. Army Ordnance Corps and Transportation Corps to Fort Lee, and the creation of the Sustainment Center of Excellence. The occasion was marked by speeches by Congressman Randy Forbes and Deputy Commanding General of TRADOC, Lieutenant General David Valcourt, who described ALU as the logistics center for the U.S. Army.

On 1 May 2023, Army Logistics University was renamed Army Sustainment University.
