= Southpark Mall (Virginia) =

Shopping mall in east-central Virginia, U.S.

Coordinates: 37.25438°N 77.392330°W

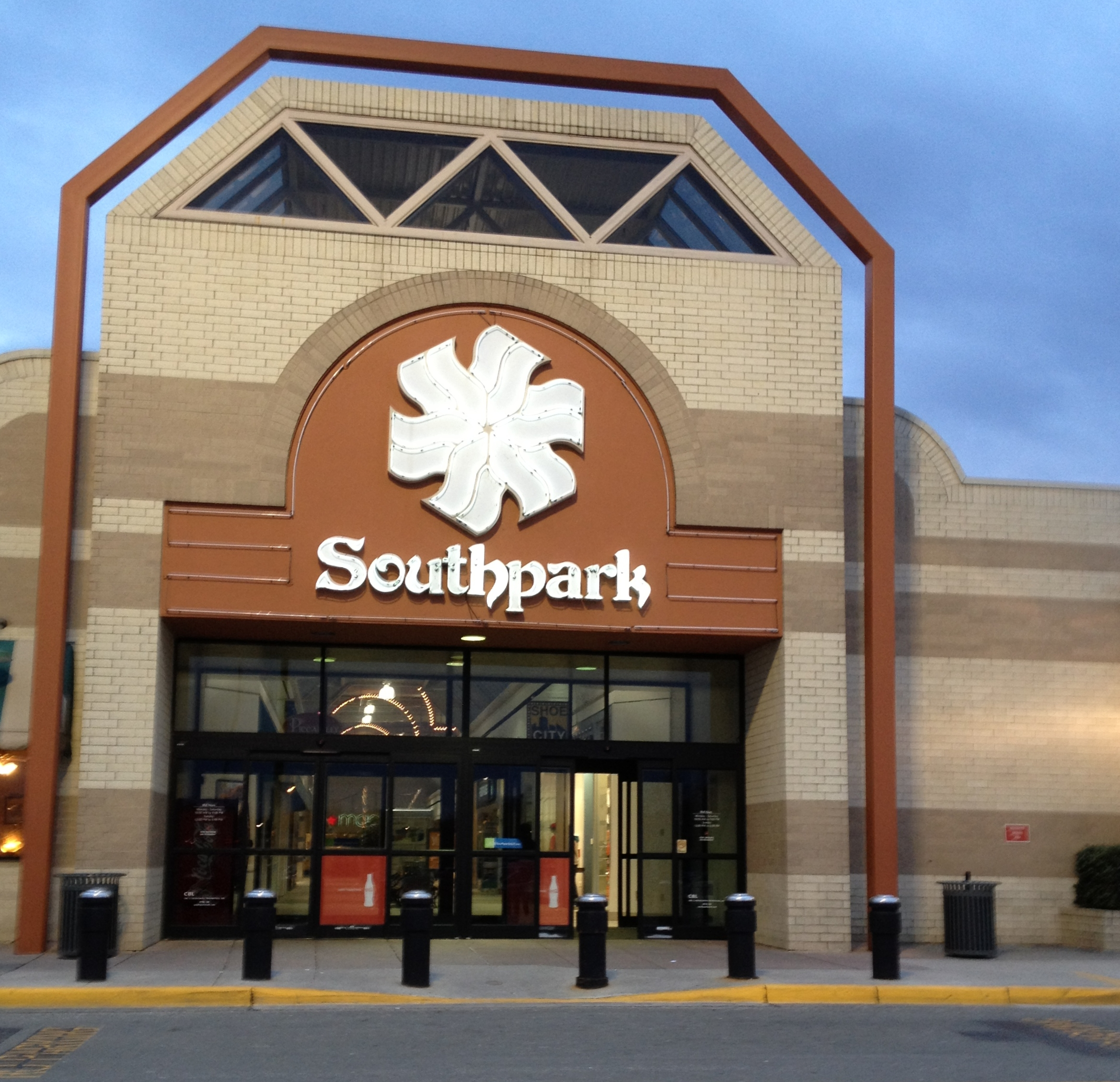
- Entrance to Southpark Mall, February 2013
- Location: Colonial Heights, Virginia, United States
- Address: 230 Southpark Circle
- Opened: 1989
- Developer: Faison
- Manager: Spinoso Real Estate Group
- Num. of stores: 86
- Num. of anchor tenants: 5 (3 open, 2 vacant)
- Floor area: approximately 800,000 sq ft (74,000 m^{2})
- Floors: 1 (2 in former Macy's)
- Parking: Surface
- Website: www.southparkmall.com

Southpark Mall is a shopping mall serving the Tri-Cities, Virginia area, which itself is part of the much larger Richmond-Petersburg metropolitan area.

== Mall description ==
It contains 86 stores and is anchored by Dick's Sporting Goods, JCPenney, and Regal Cinemas. The mall is accessible from I-95 (Temple Avenue Exit 54 and Southpark Boulevard Exit 53) exits. The mall serves the Tri-Cities, Virginia area of the Greater Richmond Region. Southpark Mall stands at approximately 800,000 square feet (74,000 m^{2}).

== History ==
Southpark Mall first opened in 1989.

In 1993, the area surrounding the mall was damaged during the Virginia tornado outbreak. The Wal-Mart in the mall's southeast outlot area was destroyed, killing three people and injuring 198. The following year, Sam's Club opened on the site of the former Wal-Mart.

Dillard's closed in 2012. The store was originally Leggett and later Belk. The same year, renovations began on converting it to Dick's Sporting Goods and small shop space.

On November 2, 2017, it was announced that Sears, which had been at the mall since its opening in 1989, would be closing as part of a plan to close 63 stores nationwide. The store closed in January 2018.

On January 9, 2025, it was announced that Macy's would be closing as part of a plan to close 66 stores nationwide. The store closed on March 23, 2025.

On August 12th 2025, it was announced that Spinoso Real Estate Group now manages the mall.
