= Sakib =

Sakib ساكب
- City
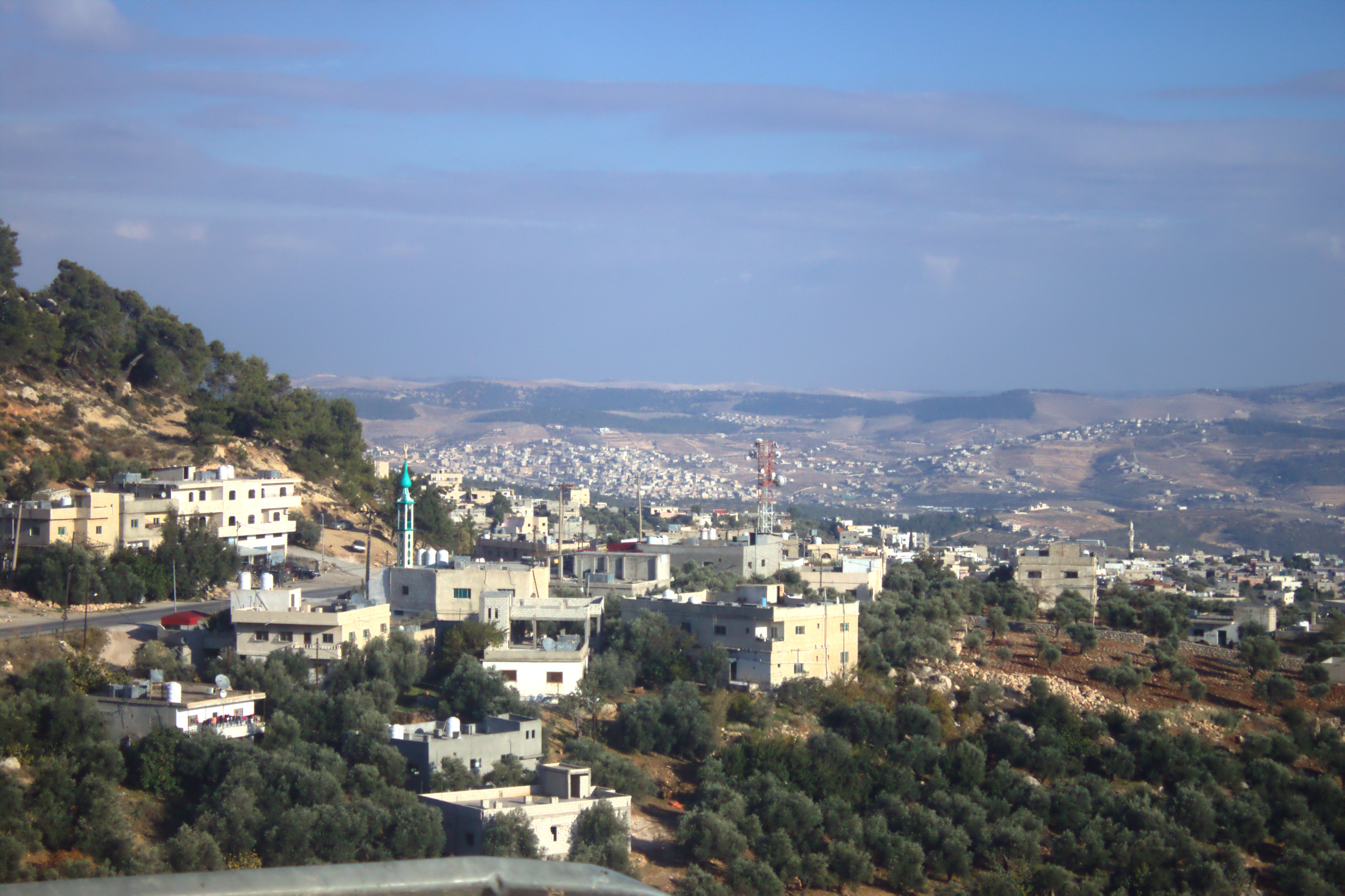

- Location within Jordan
- Coordinates: 32°17′7.61″N 35°48′40.59″E
- PAL: 226/188
- Country: Jordan
- Governorate: Jerash Governorate
- Founded: 5th century CE

Area
  - City: 8 km^{2} (3.1 sq mi)
  - Metro: 16 km^{2} (6.2 sq mi)
- Elevation: 900–1,200 m (3,000–3,900 ft)

Population (2015)
  - City: 11,586
- Time zone: UTC226/188 (GMT +2)
  - Summer (DST): +3
- Postal code: 26710
- Area code: +962(2)

Sakib (/sækɪb/; Arabic: ساكب pronounced [saːkb]), is a city in northwestern Jordan, administratively part of Jerash Governorate. The 2015 census recorded its population as 11,586. The town is situated approximately 6 miles (9.7 km) west of the city of Jerash and 34 miles (55 km) from Amman city centre.

== Etymology ==
Sakib was known as "Seecip" during the Crusades. The Arabic place-name means "flowing water".

== History ==
=== Roman and Byzantine periods ===
Archaeological remains such as Trapetum olive presses and ancient aqueducts indicate that Sakib was inhabited during the Roman era. In 2008, archaeologists have found a cemetery dating back to the Byzantine period, and It is considered to have a notable historical value.

=== Early Islamic era ===
Sakib was captured by forces of the Rashidun Caliphate in 629. During the time of the Umayyad Empire, A hamlet and a mosque were built in the southwestern part of the town.

=== Crusader rule ===
Sakib (Seecip) was acquired by the Crusaders in 1100. Later, it became the eastern border of the Kingdom of Jerusalem with the Seljuk Empire. In the year 1120, a garrison of forty men stationed in Jerash by Zahir ad-Din Toghtekin, atabeg of Damascus converted the Temple of Artemis into a fortress. It was captured in 1121 by Baldwin II, King of Jerusalem, and demolished. Then, the Crusaders immediately abandoned Jerash, and withdrew to Sakib; the eastern border of the settlement.

=== Ottoman period ===
Sakib, like the rest of the Levant, was incorporated into the Ottoman Empire in 1517. According to the Ottoman census in the 16th century, Sakib was two contiguous villages named Sakib and Aysra (عيصره). Aysra now is part of present-day Sakib and forms its northern part. In the census of 1538, it was located in the nahiyah (subdistrict) of Ajlun of the liwa (district) of Ajlun. It had a population of 13 Muslim households and 1 mosque's imam, while Aysra had a population of 7 households and 1 mosque's imam. The census from 1596 indicates that Sakib had a population of 12 households, all Muslim.

In 1868, the missionary Frederick Augustus Klein visited the region, and illustrated that it is beautiful and there are twenty inhabited villages in the district including Sakib. He also added there was one Greek priest to look to the spiritual affairs of the Christian families in the district.

On April 14, 1882, Prince Albert Victor, Duke of Clarence and Avondale and his brother Prince George of Wales (later King George V) visited the area, and they said: "Next we passed Sakib village at 9.10, and entered the Wady Hamur (roebuck) at 9.30; long stretches of corn were growing at the bottom, and the cliffs were wooded at the side with pines and oaks intermixed. A most enjoyable English-like morning as we ride along by the stream which goes gurgling over its pebble bed down the valley; we cross it ever and anon, and dip in and out of the copses which cling to the hill-side and remind some of us much of Wales, and others of Scotland."

The English soldier Claude Reignier Conder visited the country north of Amman as far as Jerash in April, 1882, when he attended Prince Albert Victor and Prince George of Wales on their visit to the country beyond Jordan. He said: "And by Sakib, on its cliff down which a stream falls in a long cascade, we gain the beautiful glens which run down from the rugged Ajlun to the green valley of Jordan. With exception of the woods of Tabor (now sadly thinned), the copses of Carmel, the oaks of Harosheth, and the groves of Banias, there is nothing in western Palestine which can at all compare with the beauty of the ravines of Gilead between Wady Hesban on the south and the Hieromax on the north. Beside clear mountain brooks the horseman wanders through glades of oak and terebinth, with dark pines above. The valleys green with corn, the streams fringed with oleander, the magnificent screens of yellow, green, and russet foliage, which cover the steep slopes, present a scene of quiet beauty, of chequered light and shade."

=== Modern period ===
The Jordanian census of 1961 found 1,552 inhabitants in Sakib.

== Geography ==
Sakib is situated on the East Bank Plateau. Originally, the city had been built on Mountains. Sakib's terrain is typified by its mountains, and the area's elevation ranges from 900 to 1,200 m. Jerash is located to the east, Irbid io the north, Zarqa to the southeast and the capital Amman is to Sakib's south.

City	Distance km (mi)	Site
Jerash	10 (6)	East
Irbid	37 (23)	North
Zarqa	54 (33)	Southeast
Amman	55 (34)	South

=== Climate ===
Sakib has a Mediterranean climate; cool winter and warm to hot summer. The average annual rainfall is about 422 mm (16.6 inches) per year. Its average annual temperature is 23.5 °C (74.3 °F) during the day and 13 °C (55.4 °F) at night. Snow falls once or twice a year.

Climate data for Sakib
Month	Jan	Feb	Mar	Apr	May	Jun	Jul	Aug	Sep	Oct	Nov	Dec	Year
Mean daily maximum °C (°F)	13.0 (55.4)	14.0 (57.2)	18.0 (64.4)	23.0 (73.4)	27.0 (80.6)	30.0 (86.0)	32.0 (89.6)	32.0 (89.6)	30.0 (86.0)	27.0 (80.6)	21.0 (69.8)	15.0 (59.0)	23.5 (74.3)
Mean daily minimum °C (°F)	5.0 (41.0)	6.0 (42.8)	8.0 (46.4)	11.0 (51.8)	15.0 (59.0)	18.0 (64.4)	20.0 (68.0)	20.0 (68.0)	19.0 (66.2)	16.00 (60.80)	11.0 (51.8)	7.0 (44.6)	13.00 (55.40)
Average precipitation mm (inches)	79.0 (3.11)	95.0 (3.74)	69.0 (2.72)	18.0 (0.71)	24.0 (0.94)	1.0 (0.04)	2.0 (0.08)	0 (0)	1.0 (0.04)	20.0 (0.79)	42.0 (1.65)	71.0 (2.80)	422 (16.62)
Average precipitation days	12	10	8	5	2	0	0	0	1	4	6	9	57
Source: World Weather Online

=== Fauna and flora ===
The entire forest reserves in the region extends over an area of 60 km^{2}. The forest is a home to many endemic Mammals, including the wild boar, the jackal, the red fox, the Persian squirrel and the hedgehog. The notable birds are the Eurasian hoopoe, the common blackbird, the bee-eater, the Jay, the tit, the goldfinch, the nightingale and the roller.

The most common plants present in the area are oak, Aleppo pine, Greek strawberry tree, Tabor oak (national tree), Mediterranean cypress, carob, terebinth and cedar. The ground flora includes numerous kinds of species such as windflower, black iris (national flower), oxeye daisy, orchids, Clover, ragged-robin, Tagetes, Cyclamen and tulip.

== Population ==
Population of Sakib
Year	Population
1538	13 households
1596	12 households
1922	800
1961	1552
1994	8237
2004	10233
2015	11586

The population of Sakib at the 2015 census was 11,586.

== Education ==
There are ten governmental schools for all educational stages. There are also some private schools.

Nearby universities include Jerash University (14 km), Philadelphia University (26 km), Yarmouk University (35 km), Jordan University of Science and Technology (36 km), and The University of Jordan (50 km).

== Income and economy ==
The townspeople are mostly knowledge workers (doctors, academics, engineers, teachers, military officers, diplomats, bankers, etc.). Trade and tourism are also aspects in the town's economy.

== Cultural events and festivals ==
Sakib hosts a number of successful annual cultural events. In addition, Sakib International Culture & Art Festival is an annual festival held in the town. Several Jordanian/foreign poets and formative artists participate. The festival features poetry, literature and scientific sessions, as well as plein air painting.

== Sport ==
The town has a handball team that takes part in the national competitions. It also has some sport facilities such as gyms and five-a-side football pitches.

== Bibliography ==
- Abu Abila, Mohammad (2008). A Byzantine Cemetery at Sakib. Amman, Dept. of Antiquities, Hashemite Kingdom of Jordan. OCLC 460760204.
- Albert Victor, Prince Duke of Clarence and Avondale; George, King of Great Britain; John Neale Dalton (1886). The cruise of Her Majesty's ship "Bacchante", 1879-1882. London, Macmillan and Co. ISBN 978-1177811873.
- Bakhīt, M. A.; Ḥamūd, N. R. (1989). Daftar mufaṣṣal Liwāʼ ʻAjlūn : ṭābū daftarī raqm 970, Istānbūl = Kanunname-yi Liva-yı Aclun. (The Detailed Defter of the Liwāʼ of ʻAjlūn (Year 1538)). Amman: The University of Jordan. OCLC 28579987.
- Conder, Claude Reignier (1885), Heth and Moab : explorations in Syria in 1882, London : Richard Bentley & Son, ISBN 978-1279443477, OCLC 562276996
- Government of Jordan, Department of Statistics (1964). First Census of Population and Housing. Volume I: Final Tables; General Characteristics of the Population (PDF).
- Hütteroth, W.-D.; Abdulfattah, K. (1977). Historical Geography of Palestine, Transjordan and Southern Syria in the Late 16th Century. Erlanger Geographische Arbeiten, Sonderband 5. Erlangen, Germany: Vorstand der Fränkischen Geographischen Gesellschaft. ISBN 3-920405-41-2.
- Kareem, Jum'a Mahmoud (2000). The settlement patterns in the Jordan Valley in the mid- to late Islamic period. Oxford : Archaeopress. ISBN 9781841710785. OCLC 231864072.
- Klein, Frederick (1869), "Missionary tour into a portion of the Trans-Jordanic Countries, Jebl Ajlun, the Belka and Kerek", The Church Missionary Intelligencer, A Monthly Journal of Missionary Information, vol. 5, pp. 62–64, 92–199, ISBN 978-1142006761
