= National Register of Historic Places listings in Colonial Heights, Virginia =

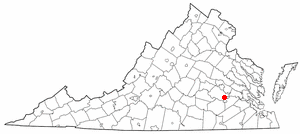
Location of Colonial Heights in Virginia

This is a list of the National Register of Historic Places listings in Colonial Heights, Virginia.

This is intended to be a complete list of the properties and districts on the National Register of Historic Places in the independent city of Colonial Heights, Virginia, United States. The locations of National Register properties and districts for which the latitude and longitude coordinates are included below, may be seen in a Google map.

There are 8 properties and districts listed on the National Register in the city.

This National Park Service list is complete through NPS recent listings posted September 4, 2026.

== Current listings ==
	Name on the Register	Image	Date listed	Location	Description
1	Chesterfield Highlands Historic District	Chesterfield Highlands Historic District	July 23, 2013 (#13000540)	Roughly bounded by the Boulevard and E. Westover, Lafayette, Pickwick, Danville, and Lee Aves. 37°14′56″N 77°24′26″W	
2	Conjurer's Field Archeological Site (44CF20)	Conjurer's Field Archeological Site (44CF20)	October 25, 1990 (#90001139)	Along the Appomattox River near the Kennon House; 37°17′09″N 77°21′55″W	
3	Conjurer's Neck Archeological District	Conjurer's Neck Archeological District	October 23, 2003 (#03001090)	131 Waterfront Dr. 37°17′07″N 77°21′57″W	Address is that of the Kennon House, which is included in the district
4	Ellerslie	Ellerslie	December 4, 1973 (#73002206)	Ellerslie Rd. 37°16′17″N 77°24′16″W	
5	Fort Clifton Archeological Site	Fort Clifton Archeological Site	February 3, 1981 (#81000639)	Fort Clifton Park; 37°16′52″N 77°21′56″W	Remains of a Civil War fortification
6	Oak Hill	Oak Hill	July 30, 1974 (#74002233)	151 Carroll Ave. 37°14′13″N 77°24′33″W	
7	Violet Bank	Violet Bank	July 30, 1974 (#74002234)	Royal Oak Ave. 37°14′31″N 77°24′19″W	
8	Violet Bank Historic District	Violet Bank Historic District	September 29, 2015 (#15000679)	Lee, Lafayette, Hamilton, Cameron, Virginia, and Royal Oak Aves., and Arlington Place; 37°14′34″N 77°24′21″W	

== See also ==
- List of National Historic Landmarks in Virginia
- National Register of Historic Places listings in Virginia
