= Violet Bank Historic District =

Historic district in Virginia, United States

- U.S. National Register of Historic Places
- U.S. Historic district
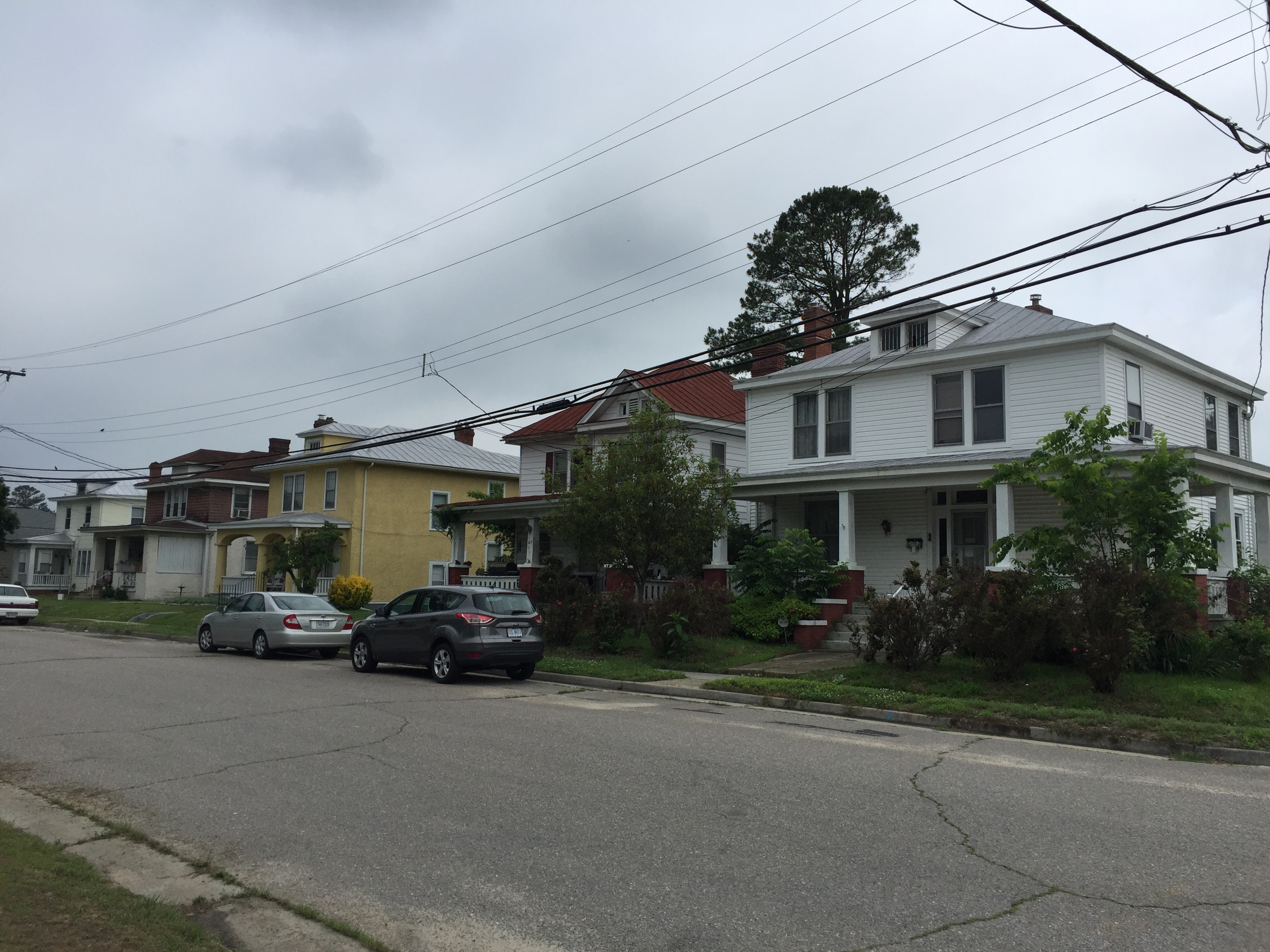
- Houses in the Violet Bank Historic District

- Location within Virginia Location within the United States
- Location: Lee, Lafayette, Hamilton, Cameron, Virginia, & Royal Oak Aves., Arlington Place, Colonial Heights, Virginia
- Coordinates: 37°14′40″N 77°24′23″W
- Area: 50 acres (20 ha)
- Built: 1908
- Architectural style: Late 19th and early 20th century revivals, Late 19th and early 20th century American movements
- NRHP reference No.: 15000679
- Added to NRHP: September 29, 2015

The Violet Bank Historic District encompasses a historic streetcar suburban area of Colonial Heights, Virginia. The area, originally part of the large Violet Bank plantation, was platted and subdivided in the early 20th century, with development restrictions that resulted in a significant uniformity of layout within the subdivisions. Specific restrictions against flat roofs and fencing between yards are still evident in the building constructed in the area, which includes 237 primarily residential buildings on about 50 acres (20 ha) of land. The district includes the original Violet Bank plantation house, now a museum.

The district was listed on the National Register of Historic Places in 2015.

== See also ==
- National Register of Historic Places listings in Colonial Heights, Virginia
