= Tornadoes of 1993 =

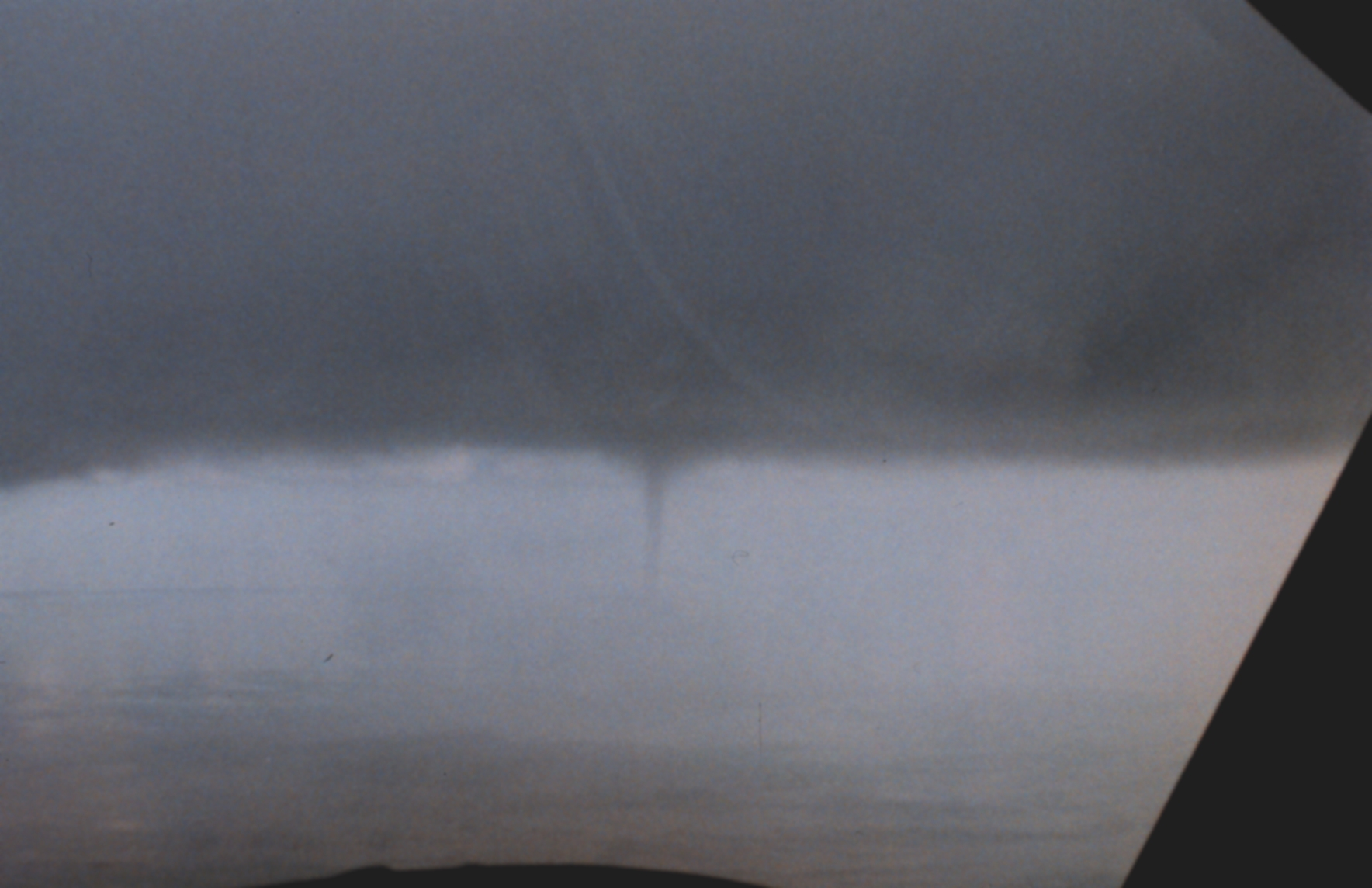
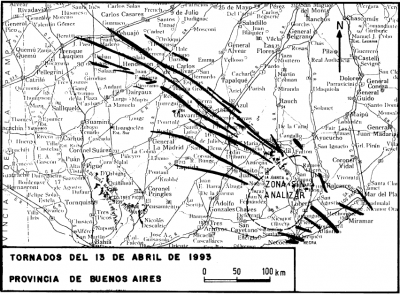
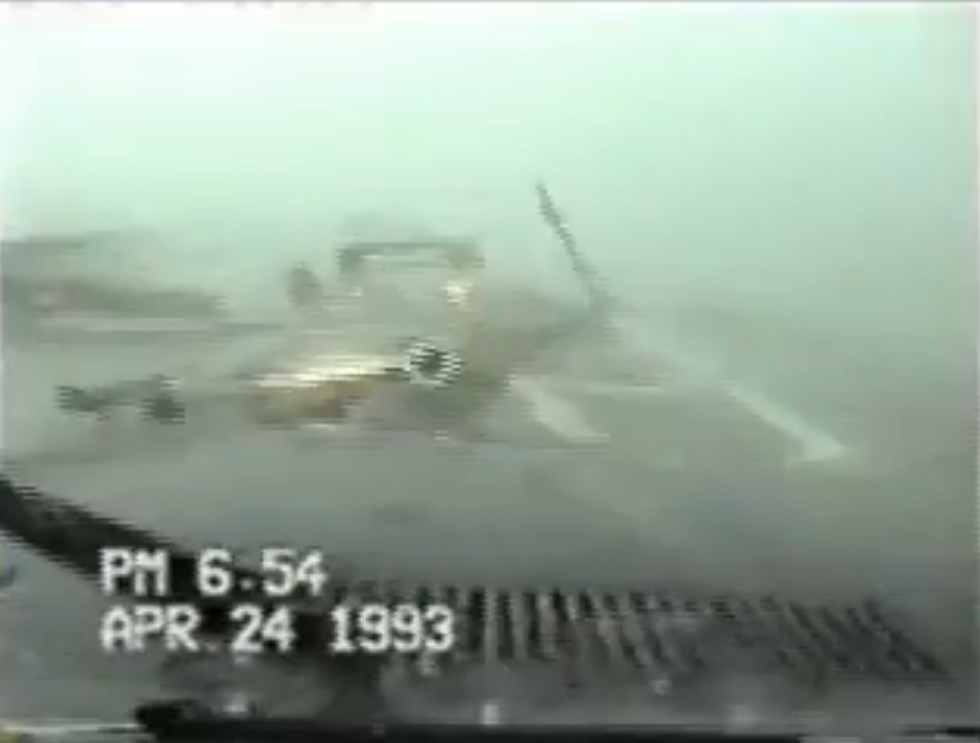
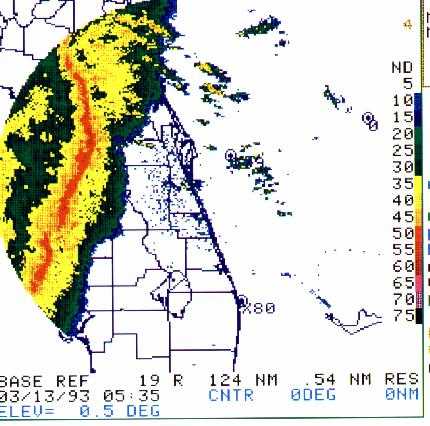
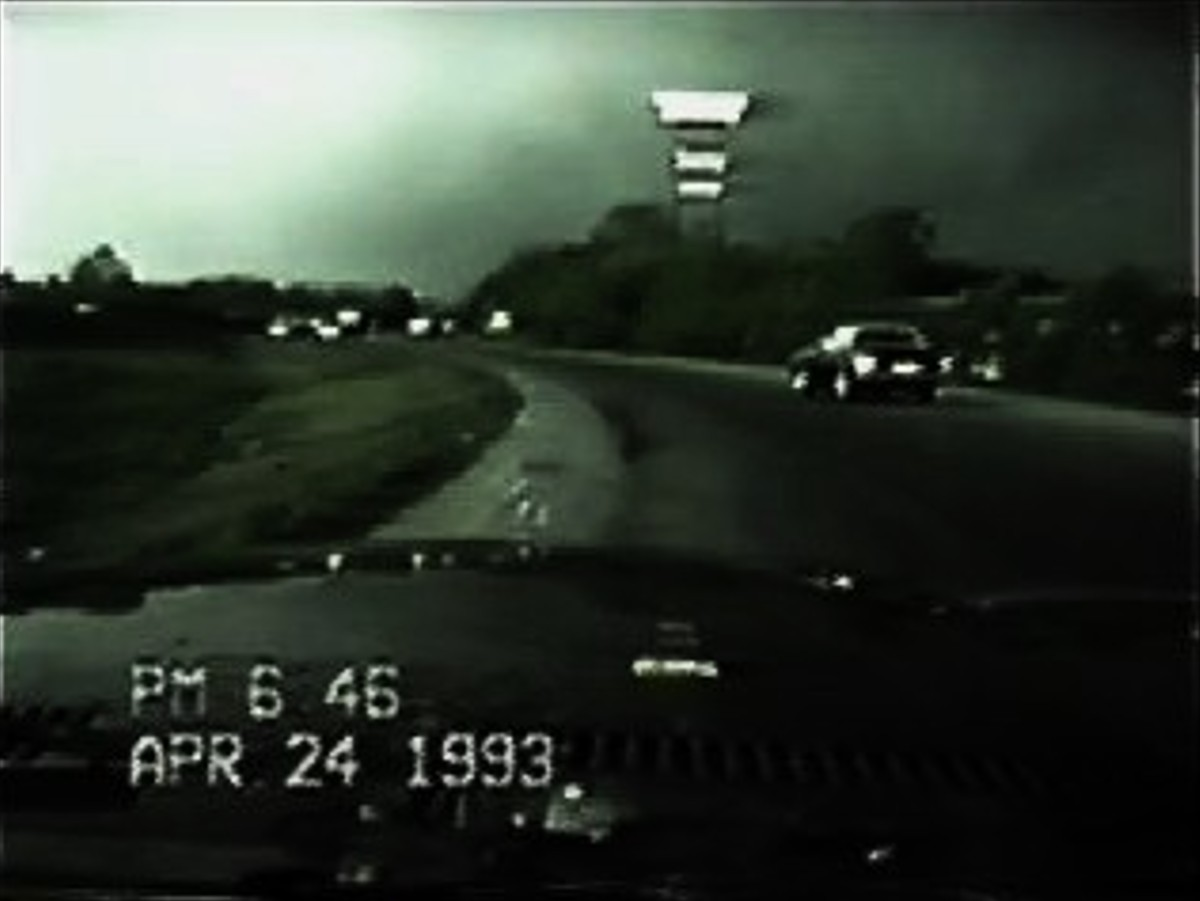
- Clockwise from top: A waterspout off the Florida Keys in August; Damage near Catoosa, Oklahoma shortly after an F4 tornado on April 24; GOES-7 Visible Satellite loop of tornado producing supercells in southeastern Virginia on August 6; A dashboard camera still of a rain-wrapped F4 tornado in Catoosa, Oklahoma on April 24; A radar scan of a tornado producing derecho over Florida on March 13; A map of major tornadoes across the Buenos Aires Province on April 13.
- Timespan: January–December 1993
Maximum rated tornado
F4 tornado
- List
  – Catoosa, Oklahoma
  on April 24
  – Moscow, Kansas
  on May 5
  – Wilson Lake, Kansas
  on May 7
  – Coleman, South Dakota
  on June 7
  – Junius, South Dakota
  on June 7
  – Petersburg, Virginia
  on August 6
- Tornadoes in U.S.: 1,173
- Damage (U.S.): >$73.22 million
- Fatalities (U.S.): 33
- Fatalities (worldwide): >228

This page documents the tornadoes and tornado outbreaks of 1993, primarily in the United States. Most tornadoes form in the U.S., although some events may take place internationally. Tornado statistics for older years like this often appear significantly lower than modern years due to fewer reports or confirmed tornadoes, however by the 1990s tornado statistics were coming closer to the numbers we see today.

== Synopsis ==
Fatal United States tornadoes in 1993
- Approximate touchdown location of killer tornadoes in 1993 Summary of tornadoes: February 21 – Tennessee (1 death); February 21 – Georgia (1 death); February 21 – Georgia (1 death); March 12 – Florida (3 deaths); March 12 – Florida (1 death); March 12 – Florida (1 death); April 8 – Louisiana (3 deaths); April 24 – Oklahoma (7 deaths); May 7 – Kansas (1 death); May 9 – Texas (1 death); June 9 – Pennsylvania (1 death); August 6 – Virginia (4 deaths); August 9 – Minnesota (2 deaths); September 3 – New York (2 deaths); October 18 – Texas (1 death); October 30 – Georgia (3 deaths); Total fatalities: 33

Like 1992, the 1993 tornado season was unusually late. While April and May saw less activity than normal, June again was very busy with 313 tornadoes, and July saw 242. Fall was very quiet and saw no large outbreaks. 1993 was also the first year since 1989 to be without an F5 tornado.

== Events ==
Confirmed tornado total for the entire year 1993 in the United States.

Confirmed tornadoes by Fujita rating
FU	F0	F1	F2	F3	F4	F5	Total
0	733	324	80	30	6	0	1,173

== January ==
There were 17 tornadoes confirmed in the US in January.

== February ==
There were 78 tornadoes confirmed in the US in February.

=== February 21–23 ===
A severe weather outbreak in the Southeastern United States produced 24 tornadoes rated as high as F3. A particularly destructive tornado struck the community of Lenoir City, Tennessee. Multiple buildings and businesses were destroyed, resulting in damagesof more than $2 million. The line of severe thunderstorms also blasted the area with marble-sized hail and left 7,000 residents without power for much of the night.

== March ==
There were 48 tornadoes confirmed in the US in March.

=== March 12 ===
FU	F0	F1	F2	F3	F4	F5
0	11	4	3	0	0	0

Five people were killed in Florida by three separate tornadoes spawned by a major derecho with embedded supercells. This derecho was the southern edge of the 1993 Storm of the Century. The derecho in Cuba spawned seven tornadoes in the provinces of Artemisa and Pinar del Rio

== April ==
There were 85 tornadoes confirmed in the US in April.

=== April 8 ===
FU	F0	F1	F2	F3	F4	F5
0	0	2	1	0	0	0

Two weak F1 tornadoes touched down in South Texas during the early morning hours of April 8. That afternoon, a strong waterspout moved ashore and struck Grand Isle, Louisiana as a devastating F2 tornado. A wood-frame high school and a post office were destroyed, and many homes, mobile homes, apartments, and businesses were also damaged or destroyed. A female high school senior was killed on the second school floor of the destroyed high school, while two construction workers were killed on the first floor of a home they were remodeling near the high school. Along with the fatalities, 39 other people were injured. The tornado then crossed over the Caminada Bay and moved into Cheniere Caminada before dissipating.

=== April 12 (Dominican Republic) ===
A tornado in Constanza destroyed 21 homes and injured 2 girls.

=== April 13 (Argentina) ===
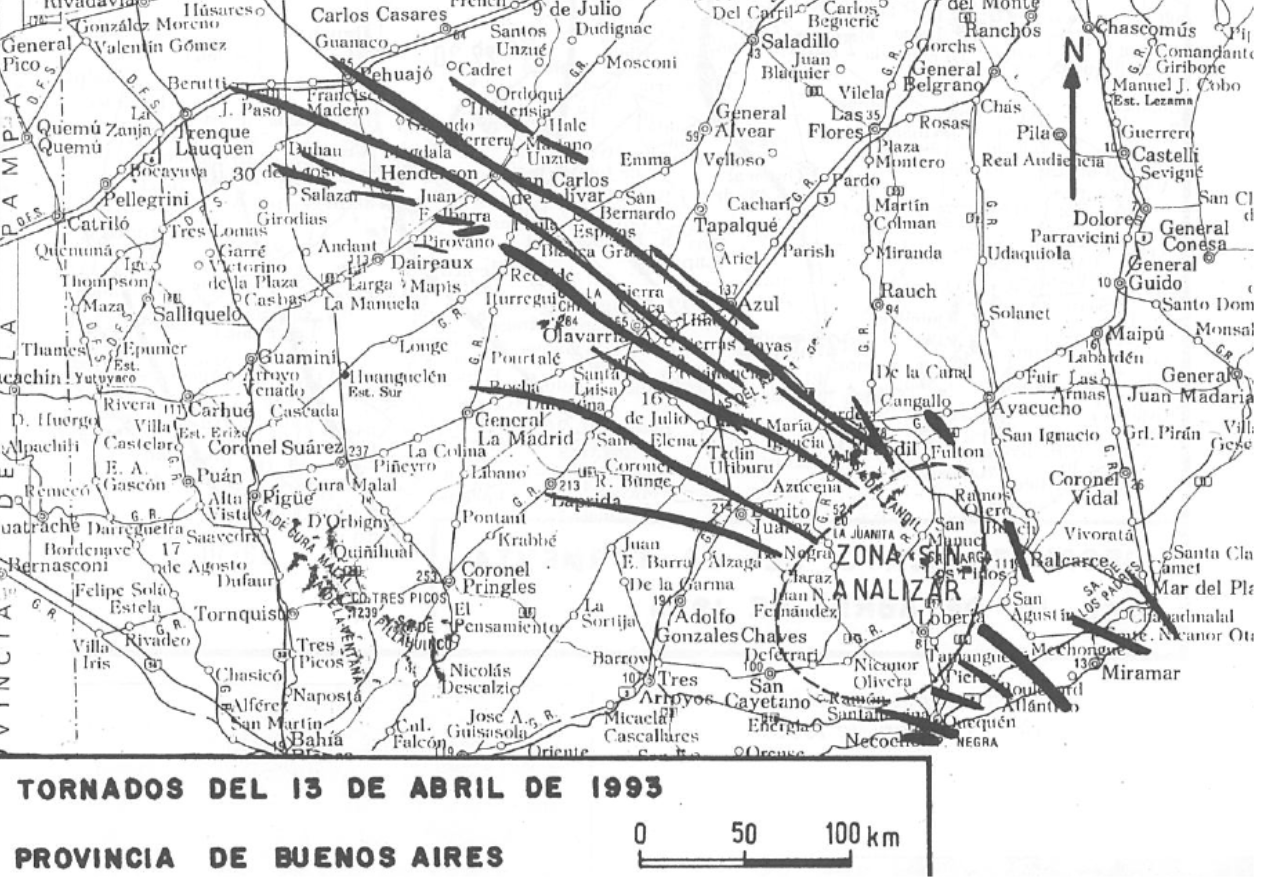
Estimated path of major tornadoes. One region of the map has been left unanalyzed.

The 1993 Buenos Aires tornado outbreak [es] was an outbreak (QLCS type) of more than ≥100 tornadoes that affected the southern area of Buenos Aires province. It occurred between the night of Tuesday, April 13 and 14, leaving 7 people dead and more than a hundred injured and evacuated. Between the 20th and 24th hour, an extraordinary system of severe convective storms affected the localities of Trenque Lauquen, Pehuajó, Hipólito Yrigoyen, Carlos Casares, Bolívar, Daireaux, General Lamadrid, Olavarría, Tapalqué, Azul, Laprida, Benito Juárez, Tandil, Necochea, Lobería, Balcarce, General Alvarado and General Pueyrredon. The most affected localities were Henderson (F3), Urdampilleta (F3) and Mar del Plata (F2). This succession of tornadoes had intensities ranging from F0 to F3 and produced severe damage along northwest to southeast-oriented strips. The local area affected exceeded 4,000 square kilometers (1500 sq mi). The phenomenon was popularly called "La Noche De Los 100 Tornados" (the night of 100 tornadoes) and so far holds the record of being the largest tornado outbreak ever recorded in the southern hemisphere.

=== April 24 ===
FU	F0	F1	F2	F3	F4	F5
0	7	2	2	1	1	0

Seven people were killed and 100 were injured by an F4 tornado in Catoosa, Oklahoma. Those seven fatalities were the most by any one tornado in 1993. The tornado damaged or destroyed 75% of the town's businesses. It is the 9th costliest tornado in Oklahoma history.

=== April 27 (Dominican Republic) ===
An F1 tornado formed over Sabana de la Mar.

== May ==
There were 177 tornadoes confirmed in the US in May.

=== May 7 ===
FU	F0	F1	F2	F3	F4	F5
0	21	15	10	2	2	0

50 tornadoes in the Midwest resulted in one fatality from an F4 tornado in Kansas.

== June ==
There were 313 tornadoes confirmed in the US in June.

=== June 7–9 ===
FU	F0	F1	F2	F3	F4	F5
0	64	26	10	5	2	0

A prolific early-summer tornado outbreak took place between June 7–9, mainly in the northern Great Plains and Upper Midwest states. On June 7, 41 tornadoes were confirmed. South Dakota was the hardest hit, with two F4 tornadoes confirmed in the eastern part of the state. One of the F4 tornadoes tracked for 55 miles (89 km) miles, beginning just west of Lyons, and ending just south of Astoria, crossing Interstate 29 in its path. On June 8, 57 tornadoes were confirmed. While most tornadoes did stay around the Upper Midwest, the highest rated tornado that day was an F3 tornado which occurred north of Kildare, Oklahoma. A cluster of tornadoes also occurred in central Wisconsin on that day, including an F2 tornado that hit near Ripon. The outbreak finished off on June 9, with nine weak tornadoes confirmed, primarily in Oklahoma, however, an F0 tornado killed one person in Caln, Pennsylvania that same day.

Overall, 107 tornadoes were confirmed over three days. At the time, it was the second largest June outbreak after the Mid–June 1992 tornado outbreak, which occurred just under a year earlier.

=== June 19 ===
FU	F0	F1	F2	F3	F4	F5
0	2	3	0	2	0	0

Two F3 tornadoes occurred in eastern Iowa. The first one occurred near Manchester, while the second one occurred south of Dubuque about an hour later. No fatalities were reported.

=== June 29–30 ===
FU	F0	F1	F2	F3	F4	F5
0	27	15	5	2	0	0

An F3 tornado near Beaver Crossing, South Dakota kicked off the final tornado outbreak of the month. Multiple tornadoes were recorded in Iowa on June 29, with the strongest being an F2 tornado that occurred north of Pocahontas. 33 tornadoes occurred on June 30, with Ohio primarily affected. The second F3 tornado of the outbreak struck near Hillsboro, Ohio. 49 tornadoes were confirmed in total, and no fatalities were reported.

== July ==
There were 242 tornadoes confirmed in the US in July. That set a new all-time record high for July, breaking the previous record high of 213 in 1992.

=== July 7–9 ===
FU	F0	F1	F2	F3	F4	F5
0	33	15	2	1	0	0

A widespread tornado outbreak took place over most of the Plains and Midwest states, dropping 51 tornadoes in three days. The strongest was an F3 tornado that hit Bethune, Colorado, causing 8 significant injuries.

=== July 21 ===
FU	F0	F1	F2	F3	F4	F5
0	2	2	0	1	0	0

A tornado outbreak formed across Colorado causing 5 tornadoes. The strongest being an F3 near Last Chance. However, the most notable tornado of the day was a wedge tornado in open plain field near Last Chance, which was officially rated F0.

== August ==
There were 112 tornadoes confirmed in the US in August.

=== August 6 ===
FU	F0	F1	F2	F3	F4	F5
0	3	16	2	1	1	0

A rare August tornado outbreak occurred in the Southeastern United States on August 6. 22 tornadoes touched down, with one F4 killing four people and injuring over 200.

=== August 9 ===
FU	F0	F1	F2	F3	F4	F5
0	5	1	1	0	0	0

A small, but deadly tornado outbreak occurred over the Upper Midwest of the United States. An F0 tornado near Littlefork, Minnesota lifted and moved a mobile home, killing its two occupants. It is Minnesota's most recent single tornado to cause multiple deaths. Other minor tornadoes occurred in Minnesota, Iowa, and Wisconsin, causing limited damage.

At about 6:00 PM CST (23:00 UTC) a sea-level cyclone and occluded front were located over North Dakota. Observations from International Falls showed the tropopause was at 39,800 feet (12,100 m), while observations from Bismarck recorded it at 39,000 feet (12,000 m). Lifted Indices (LI) at the time CDT were also low, and thunderstorms were starting to develop in the Eastern Dakotas. In response to the storms, the National Severe Storms Forecast Center (NSSFC) issued a tornado watch for the eastern Dakotas. At 11:55 PM CST (0440 UTC) the outbreak's first confirmed tornado was reported near Gully, Minnesota. As a result of the tornado a Tornado Warning was issued for Clearwater County; the storm's next location. Ten minutes later at 12:05 PM CST (0450 UTC) another tornado, rated an F0, was reported near Roseau, Minnesota. After the two August 8th tornadoes, most local warnings were allowed to expire, as local radar did not determine any of the storms to be severe. During the early morning hours of August 9 Duluth radar indicated multicellular convection near the Littlefork, Minnesota area that was associated with an outflow boundary from the earlier Dakota storms. At 1:35 AM CST (0735 UTC) a deadly F0 tornado touched down unexpectedly near Littlefork, in association with the multicellular thunderstorm. Unstable air from the day before persisted over much of the upper Midwest, and allowed storms to form over much of the area. On the night of August 9th the strongest tornado of the outbreak, an F2, occurred near New Hampton injuring 2 people. Another cluster of thunderstorms occurred over Wisconsin, producing 3 relatively minor tornadoes.

=== August 11 ===
FU	F0	F1	F2	F3	F4	F5
0	3	0	0	1	0	0

A rare, high-altitude, intense F3 tornado moved northeastward through the Ashley National Forest in Duchesne County, Utah, producing a swath of tree damage that was at times up to a 1/2 mi-wide (0.80 km). The tornado, which touched down three times along its 17 mi-path (27 km), destroyed 1,000 acres of forest with many trees being uprooted, with some trees that had a diameter of up to 18 in (46 cm) being snapped. Towards the end of the path, the tornado impacted a troop scout camp, where four vehicles were damaged by falling trees. This is the strongest tornado to ever occur in the state of Utah.

== September ==
There were 65 tornadoes confirmed in the US in September.

== October ==
There were 55 tornadoes confirmed in the US in October.

=== October 18 ===
FU	F0	F1	F2	F3	F4	F5
0	6	3	2	0	0	0

An F2 tornado killed one near Emory, Texas after his mobile home was destroyed. The tornado developed southeast of Emory moving southeast. This tornado had a peak width of 100 yards (0.057 mi), and was on the ground for 2 miles (3.2 km).

=== October 30 ===
FU	F0	F1	F2	F3	F4	F5
0	7	3	1	0	0	0

An F2 tornado killed three people and injuring 27 in Lee County, Georgia. This tornado destroyed or severely damaged 42 homes five miles north of Albany, Georgia. The tornado had a peak width of 750 yards (0.43 mi), and moved northeast also tracking for 5 miles (8.0 km).

== November ==
There were 19 tornadoes confirmed in the US in November.

== December ==
There were 6 tornadoes confirmed in the US in December.

== See also ==
- Tornado
  - Tornadoes by year
  - Tornado records
  - Tornado climatology
  - Tornado myths
- List of tornado outbreaks
  - List of F5 and EF5 tornadoes
  - List of North American tornadoes and tornado outbreaks
  - List of 21st-century Canadian tornadoes and tornado outbreaks
  - List of European tornadoes and tornado outbreaks
  - List of tornadoes and tornado outbreaks in Asia
  - List of Southern Hemisphere tornadoes and tornado outbreaks
  - List of tornadoes striking downtown areas
- Tornado intensity
  - Fujita scale
  - Enhanced Fujita scale
