= Conjurer's Field Archeological Site =

Archaeological site in Virginia, United States

- Conjurer's Field Archeological Site (44CF20)
- U.S. National Register of Historic Places
- U.S. Historic district – Contributing property
- Virginia Landmarks Register
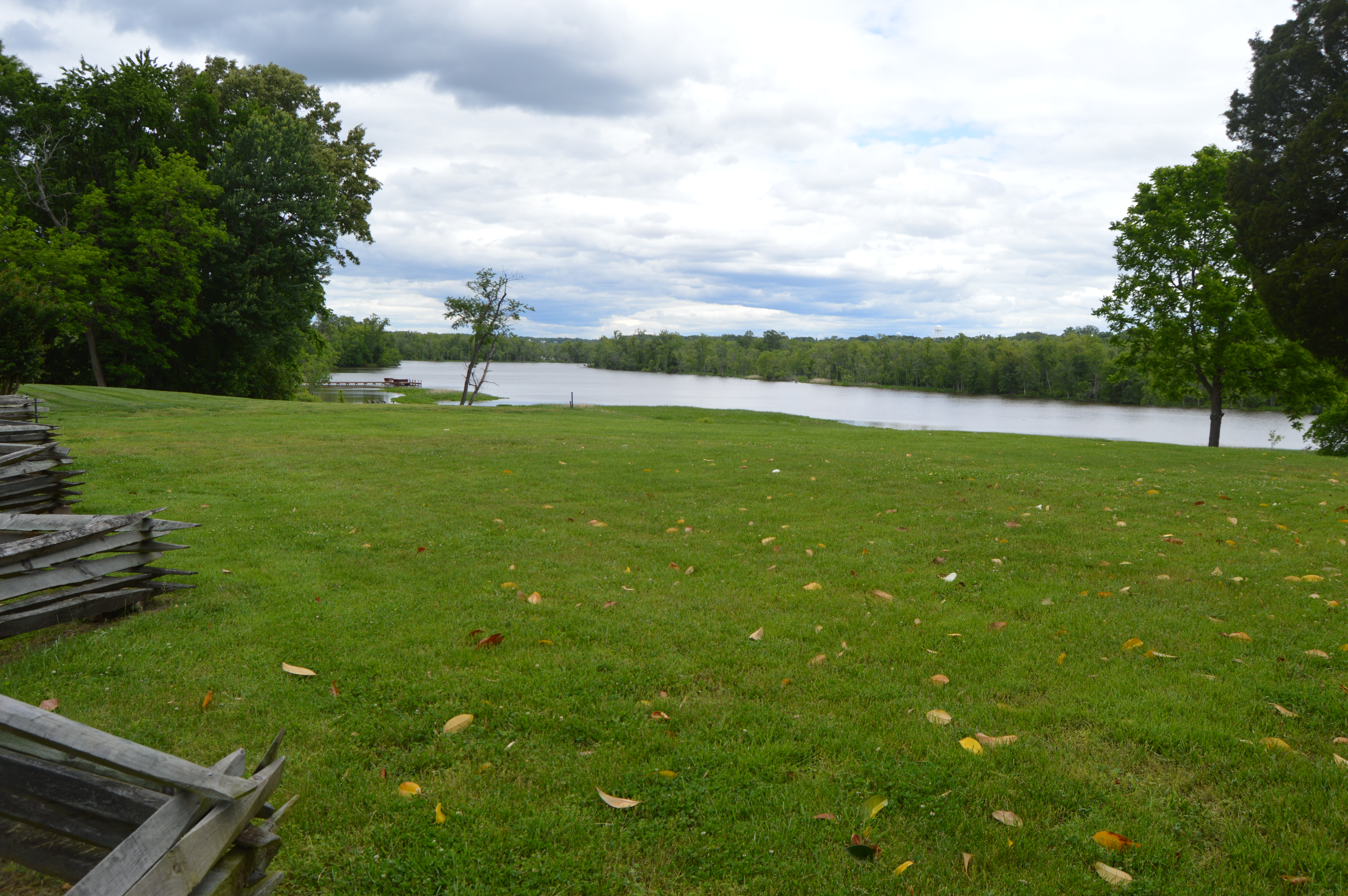
- Overview of the site
- Location: Address Restricted, Colonial Heights, Virginia
- Area: 2.6 acres (1.1 ha)
- NRHP reference No.: 90001139
- VLR No.: 106-0020

Significant dates
- Added to NRHP: October 25, 1990
- Designated VLR: December 12, 1989

Conjurer's Field Archeological Site is a historic archaeological site located at Colonial Heights, Virginia. The prehistoric village site (44CF20) is one of the last of the larger Middle and Late Woodland period villages located along the Appomattox River. The site include several well preserved burials, ceramic wares, and the presence of an undisturbed prehistoric midden.

It was listed on the National Register of Historic Places in 1990. In 2003, it was incorporated into the Conjurer's Neck Archeological District.
