= 1993 Storm of the Century =

Category 5 nor'easter in the United States

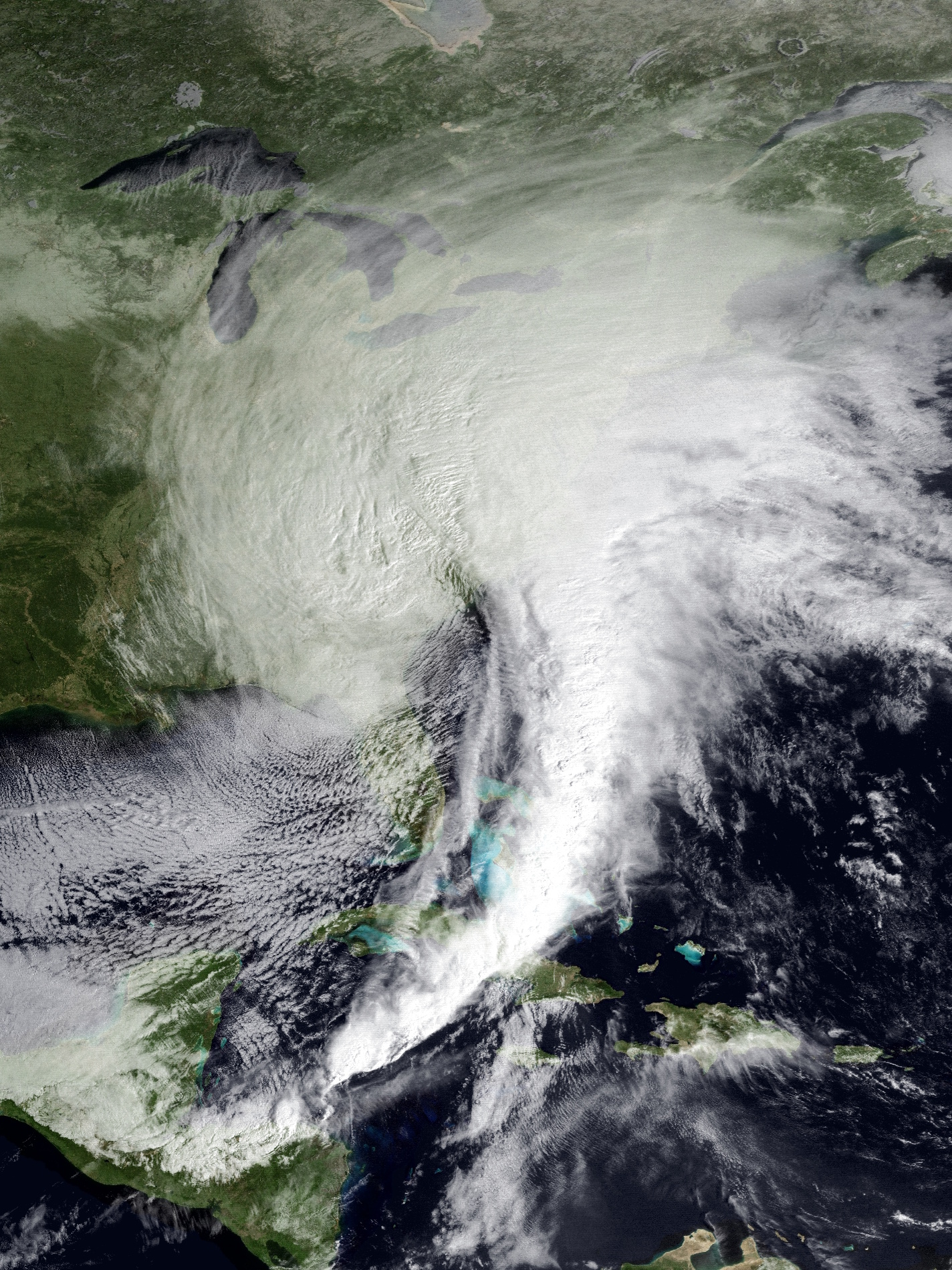
- Satellite image of the storm at 9:31 a.m. EST (14:31 UTC) on March 13, 1993

Meteorological history
- Formed: March 12, 1993
- Dissipated: March 14, 1993

Category 5 "Extreme" winter storm
- Regional snowfall index: 24.63 (NOAA)
- Highest winds: 100 mph (160 km/h)
- Highest gusts: 145 mph (230 km/h)
- Lowest pressure: 960 mbar (hPa); 28.35 inHg
- Lowest temp: −12 °F (−24 °C)
- Max. snowfall: 56 in (140 cm) at Mt. Le Conte, Tennessee

Tornado outbreak
- Tornadoes: 11
- Max. rating: F2 tornado
- Duration: 1 hour, 32 minutes

Overall effects
- Fatalities: 318
- Damage: $5.5 billion (1993 USD)
- Areas affected: Eastern United States, Canada, Mexico, Cuba, The Bahamas, Bermuda
- Power outages: >10,000,000
- Part of the 1992–93 North American winter and tornado outbreaks of 1993

The 1993 Storm of the Century (also known as the 93 Superstorm, The No Name Storm, or the Great Blizzard of '93/1993) was a devastating cyclonic storm, or nor'easter, that formed over the Gulf of Mexico on March 12, 1993. The cold weather, heavy snowfall, high winds and storm surge that the storm brought affected a very large area; at its height, it stretched from Canada to Honduras. The cyclone moved through the Gulf of Mexico and then through the eastern United States before moving on to eastern Canada. It eventually dissipated in the North Atlantic Ocean on March 15.

Heavy snow was first reported in highland areas as far south as Alabama and northern Georgia, with Union County, Georgia reporting up to 35 inches (89 cm) of snow. Birmingham, Alabama, reported a rare 13 in (33 cm) of snow. with hurricane-force gusts up to 145 mph (213 ft/s) (Recorded in Mount Washington, New Hampshire)and record low barometric pressures. Between Louisiana and Cuba, the hurricane-force winds produced high storm surges across the Big Bend of Florida which, in combination with scattered tornadoes, killed dozens of people.

Record cold temperatures were seen across portions of the Southern United States and Eastern United States in the wake of this storm. In the United States, the storm was responsible for the loss of electric power to more than 10 million households. An estimated 40 percent of the country's population experienced the effects of the storm and it led to a total of 208 fatalities. In all, the storm resulted in 318 deaths, and caused $5.5 billion (1993 USD) in damages.

The greatest recorded snowfall amounts were at Mount Le Conte in Tennessee, where 56 inches (140 cm) of snow fell, and Mount Mitchell in North Carolina, the tallest mountain in eastern North America, where 50 inches (130 cm) was measured to fall and 15-foot (4.6 m) snow drifts were reported.

== Meteorological history ==
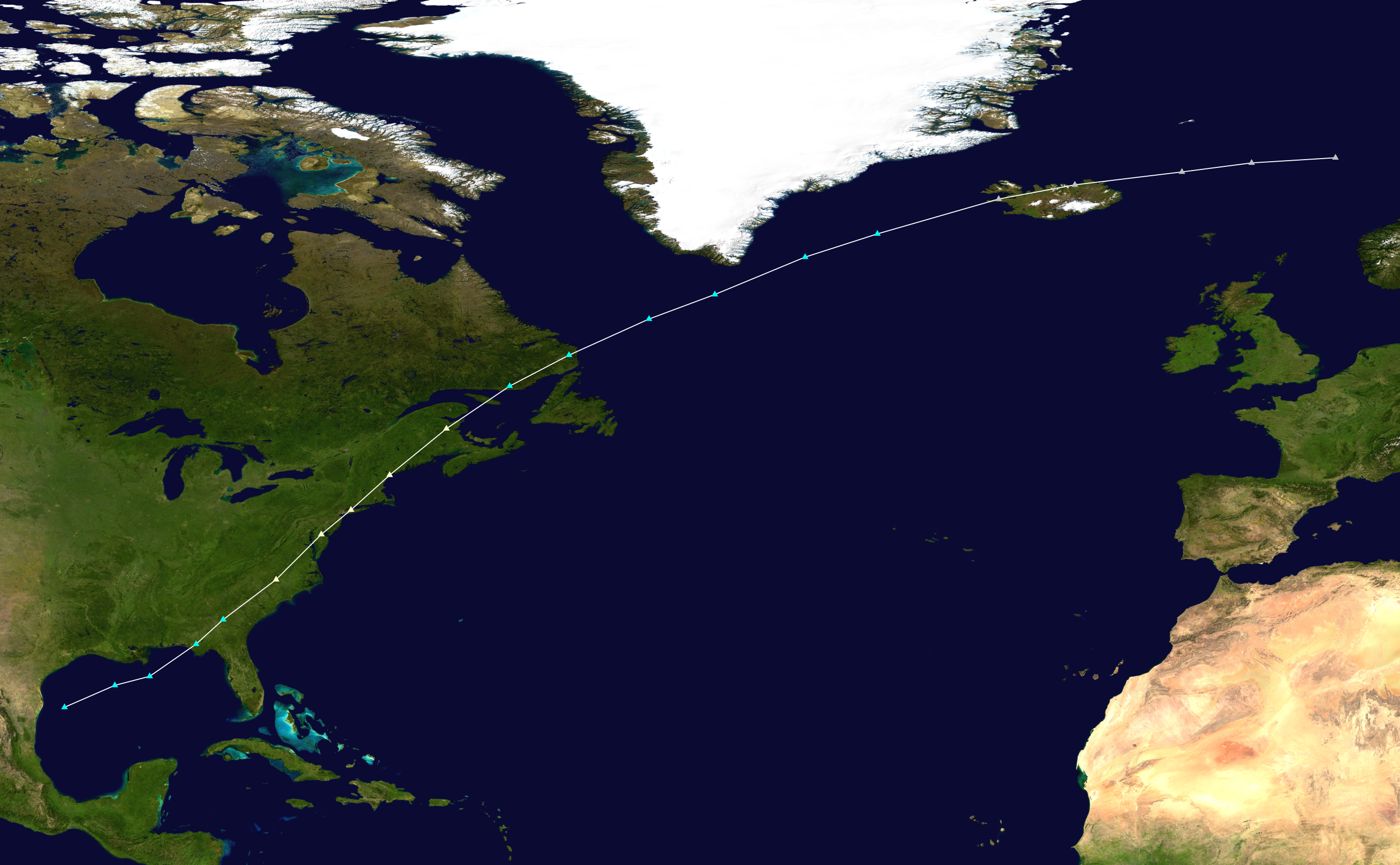
Map plotting the storm's track and intensity, according to the Saffir–Simpson scale Map key Saffir–Simpson scale Tropical depression (≤38 mph, ≤62 km/h) Tropical storm (39–73 mph, 63–118 km/h) Category 1 (74–95 mph, 119–153 km/h) Category 2 (96–110 mph, 154–177 km/h) Category 3 (111–129 mph, 178–208 km/h) Category 4 (130–156 mph, 209–251 km/h) Category 5 (≥157 mph, ≥252 km/h) Unknown Storm type Tropical cyclone Subtropical cyclone Extratropical cyclone, remnant low, tropical disturbance, or monsoon depression

Timelapse of the storm's evolution from March 11–14.

A volcanic winter is thought to have started with the 1991 eruption of Mount Pinatubo. The temperature in the stratosphere rose to several degrees higher than normal, due to the absorption of radiation by the aerosol. The stratospheric cloud from the eruption persisted in the atmosphere for three years. The eruption, while not directly responsible, may have played a part in the formation of the 1993 Storm of the Century.

During March 11 and 12, 1993, temperatures over much of the eastern United States began to drop as an arctic high pressure system built over the Midwestern United States and the Great Plains. Concurrently, an extratropical area of low pressure formed over Mexico along a stationary front draped west to east. By the afternoon of March 12, a defined airmass boundary was present along the deepening low. An initial burst of convective precipitation off the southern coast of Texas (facilitated by the transport of tropical moisture into the region) enabled initial intensification of the surface feature on March 12. Supported by a strong split-polar jet stream and a shortwave trough, the nascent system rapidly deepened. The system's central pressure fell to 991 mbar (991.0 hPa; 29.26 inHg) by 00:00 UTC on March 13. A powerful low-level jet over eastern Cuba and the Gulf of Mexico enhanced a cold front extending from the low southward to the Isthmus of Tehuantepec. Furthermore, the subtropical jet stream was displaced unusually far south, reaching into the Pacific Ocean near Central America and extending toward Honduras and Jamaica. Intense ageostrophic flow was noted over the southern United States, with winds flowing perpendicular to isobars over Louisiana.

As the area of low pressure moved through the central Gulf of Mexico, a short wave trough in the northern branch of the jet stream fused with the system in the southern stream, which further strengthened the surface low. A squall line developed along the system's cold front, which moved rapidly across the eastern Gulf of Mexico through Florida and Cuba. The cyclone's center moved into north-west Florida early on the morning of March 13, with a significant storm surge in the northwestern Florida peninsula that drowned several people. This initially caused the storm to be a blizzard but also cyclonic.

Barometric pressures recorded during the storm were low. Readings of 976 mb (976 hPa; 28.8 inHg) were recorded in Tallahassee, Florida, and even lower readings of 960 millibars (960 hPa; 28 inHg) were observed in New England. Low pressure records for March were set in areas of twelve states along the Eastern Seaboard, with all-time low pressure records set between Tallahassee and Washington, D.C. Snow began to spread over the eastern United States, and a large squall line moved from the Gulf of Mexico into Florida and Cuba. The storm system tracked up the East Coast during Saturday and into Canada by early Monday morning. In the storm's wake, unseasonably cold temperatures were recorded over the next two days in the Southeast.

=== Forecasting ===
The Storm of the Century marked a milestone in the weather forecasting of the United States. By March 8, 1993, several operational numerical weather prediction models and medium-range forecasters at the United States National Weather Service recognized the threat of a significant snowstorm. This marked the first time National Weather Service meteorologists were able to predict accurately a system's severity five days in advance. Official blizzard warnings were issued two days before the storm arrived, as shorter-range models began to confirm the predictions. Forecasters were finally confident enough of the computer-forecast models to support decisions by several northeastern states to declare a state of emergency even before the snow started to fall.

== Impact ==
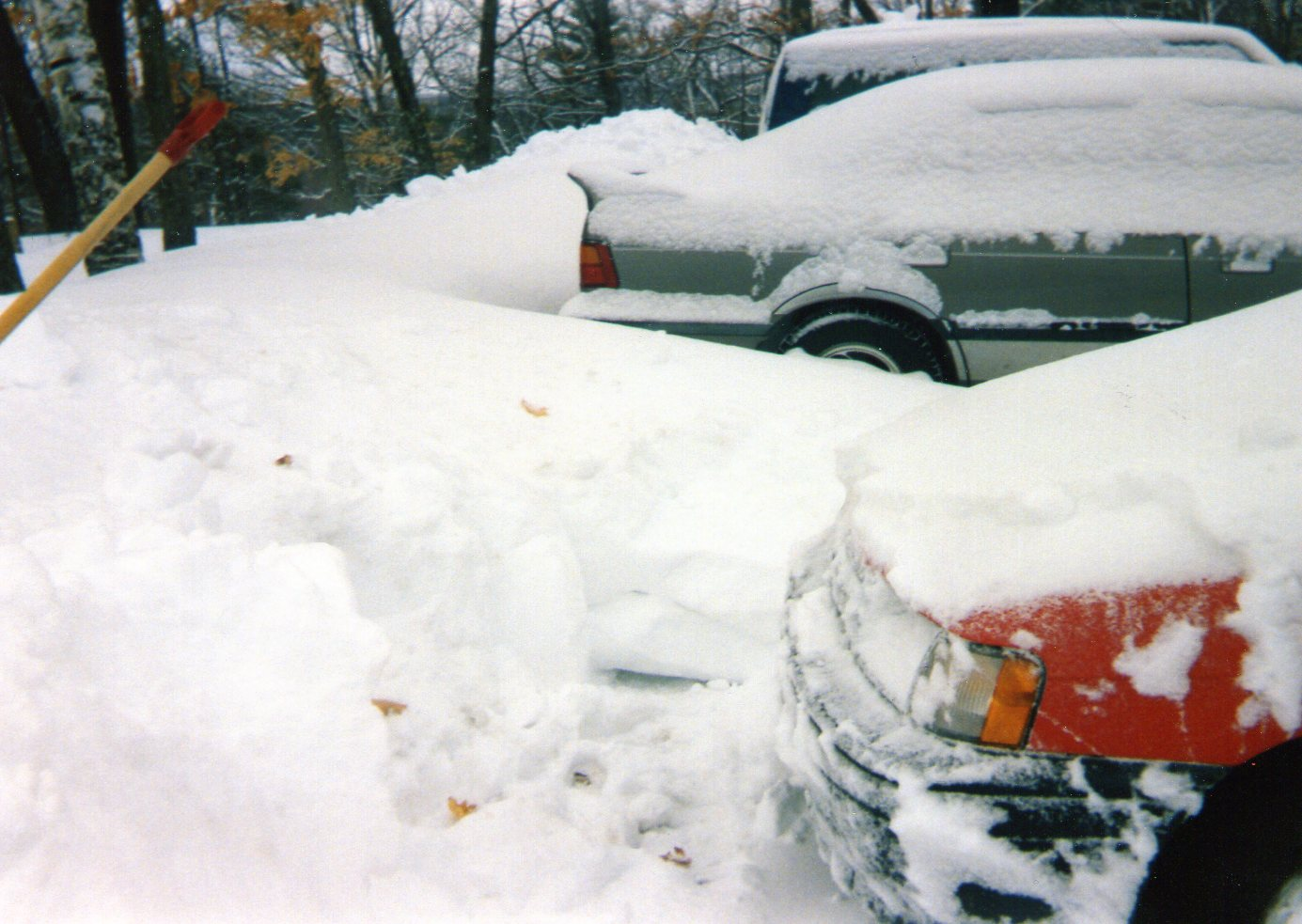
Partially dug out car at Fort Devens, Massachusetts, after the storm

The storm complex was large and widespread, affecting at least 26 US states and much of eastern Canada. It brought in cold air along with heavy precipitation and hurricane-force winds which, ultimately, caused a blizzard over the affected area; this also included thundersnow from Georgia to Pennsylvania and widespread whiteout conditions. Snow flurries were seen in the air as far south as Jacksonville, Florida, and some areas of central Florida received a trace of snow. The storm severely impacted both ground and air travel. Airports were closed all along the eastern seaboard, and flights were cancelled or diverted, thus stranding many passengers along the way. Every airport from Halifax, Nova Scotia, to Tampa, Florida was temporarily closed due to the storm. Highways were also closed or restricted all across the affected region, even in states generally well prepared for snow emergencies.

Snowstorm Totals Totals are for the main system only.
Place	Total
Mount LeConte, TN	56 inches (140 cm)
Mount Mitchell, NC	50 inches (130 cm)
Snowshoe, WV	44 in (110 cm)
Syracuse, NY	43 in (110 cm)
Tobyhanna, PA	42 in (110 cm)
Portsmouth, OH	36 in (91 cm)
Rarden, OH	36 in (91 cm)
Lincoln, NH	35 in (89 cm)
Blairsville, GA	35 in (89 cm)
Boone, NC	33 in (84 cm)
Gatlinburg, TN	30 in (76 cm)
Pittsburgh, PA	25.2 in (64 cm)
Chattanooga, TN	23 in (58 cm)
London, KY	22 in (56 cm)
Worcester, MA	20.1 in (51 cm)
Ottawa, ON	17.7 in (45 cm)
Birmingham, AL	13 in (33 cm)
Montreal, QC	16.1 in (41 cm)
Knoxville, TN	15 in (38 cm)
Trenton, NJ	14.8 in (38 cm)
Dulles, VA (25 miles W of Washington, D.C.)	14.1 in (36 cm)
Birmingham, AL	13 in (33 cm)
Boston, MA	12.8 in (33 cm)
New York, NY (LaGuardia)	12.3 in (31 cm)
Baltimore, MD (BWI)	11.9 in (30 cm)
Atlanta, GA (northern suburbs)	10.0 in (25 cm)
Huntsville, AL	7 in (18 cm)
Atlanta, GA (Hartsfield International Airport)	4.5 in (11 cm)
Mobile, AL	3 in (7.6 cm)

Some affected areas in the Appalachian Mountain region saw 5 feet (1.5 m) of snow, and snowdrifts as high as 35 feet (11 m). Mount Le Conte, Tennessee recorded 56" and Mount Mitchell, NC recorded 50 in (130 cm) of snowfall. The volume of the storm's total snowfall was later computed to be 12.91 cubic miles (53.8 km^{3}), an amount which would weigh (depending on the variable density of snow) between 5.4 and 27 billion tons.

The weight of the record snowfalls collapsed several factory roofs in the South; and snowdrifts on the windward sides of buildings caused a few decks with substandard anchoring to fall from homes. Though the storm was forecast to strike the snow-prone Appalachian Mountains, hundreds of people were nonetheless rescued from the Appalachians, many caught completely off guard on the Appalachian Trail or in cabins and lodges in remote locales. Snowdrifts up to 14 feet (4.3 m) were observed at Mount Mitchell. Snowfall totals of between 2 and 3 feet (0.61 and 0.91 m) were widespread across northwestern North Carolina. Boone, North Carolina—in a high-elevation area accustomed to heavy snowfalls—was nonetheless caught off-guard by more than 30 inches (76 cm) of snow and 24 hours of temperatures below 11 °F (−12 °C). Boone's Appalachian State University closed that week, for the first time in its history. Stranded motorists at Deep Gap broke into Parkway Elementary School to survive, and National Guard helicopters dropped hay in fields to keep livestock from starving in northern N.C. mountain counties.

In Virginia, the LancerLot sports arena in Vinton collapsed due to the weight of the record snowfall, forcing the Virginia Lancers of the ECHL to relocate to nearby Roanoke and become the Roanoke Express. Also collapsing were the roofs of a Lowe's store in Christiansburg and the Dedmon Center, at Radford University. Thousands of travelers were stranded along interstate highways in Southwest Virginia. Electricity was not restored to many isolated rural areas for up to three weeks, with power outages occurring all over the east. Nearly 60,000 lightning strikes were recorded as the storm swept over the country for a total of 72 hours. As one of the most powerful, complex storms in recent history, this storm was described as the "Storm of the Century" by many of the areas affected.

A hockey game hosted by the Philadelphia Flyers against the Los Angeles Kings was postponed due to a large window breaking from wind gusts just before the end of the first period.

=== Gulf of Mexico ===
The United States Coast Guard dealt with "absolutely incredible, unbelievable" conditions within the Gulf of Mexico. The 200-foot (61 m) freighter Fantastico sank 70 miles (110 km) off Ft. Myers, Florida, and seven of her crew died when a Coast Guard helicopter was forced back to base due to low fuel levels after rescuing three of her crew. The 147-foot (45 m) freighter Miss Beholden ran aground on a coral reef 10 miles (16 km) from Key West, Florida. Several other smaller vessels sank in the rough seas. In all, the Coast Guard rescued 235 people from over 100 boats across the Gulf of Mexico during the tempest.

=== Florida ===
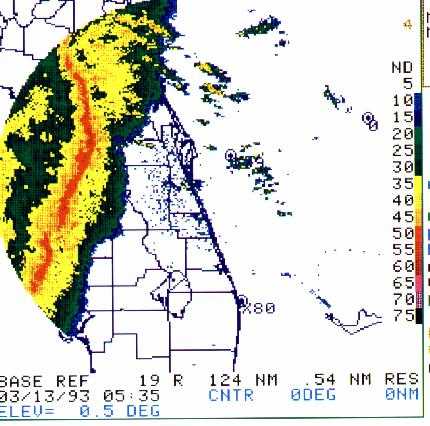
The Derecho moves into the Florida coast during the overnight hours of March 13, 1993

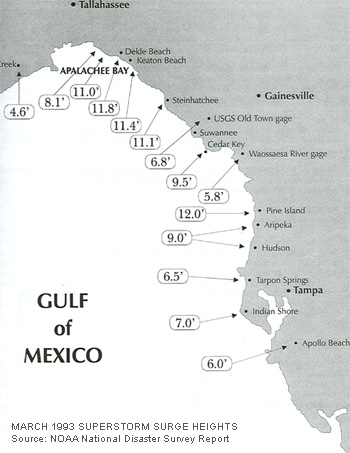
NOAA estimate of storm surges along Florida's Gulf Coast, March 13, 1993.

Besides producing record-low barometric pressure across a swath of the Southeast and Mid-Atlantic states, and contributing to one of the nation's biggest snowstorms, the low produced a potent squall line ahead of its cold front. The squall line produced a serial derecho as it moved into Florida and Cuba shortly after midnight on March 13. Straight-line winds gusted above 100 miles per hour (87 kn; 160 km/h) at many locations in Florida as the squall line moved through. A substantial tree fall was seen statewide from this system. The supercells in the derecho produced eleven tornadoes. The first tornado was an F2 that touched down in Chiefland at 04:38 UTC on March 13, damaging several mobile homes and downing trees and power lines. Three people were killed and seven people sustained injures. Around the same time, an F1 tornado was spawned near Crystal River. After moving eastward into the town, the twister damaged 15 homes, several of them severely. A total of three people were injured. The next tornado was a waterspout that moved ashore over Treasure Island around 05:00 UTC. Rated F0, the tornado deroofed one home, damaged several others, and impacted a few boats.

Around 05:04 UTC, an F0 tornado was reported in New Port Richey, damaging several homes and injuring 11 people. About 16 minutes later, an F2 tornado formed to the southwest of Ocala. Many trees fell and several storage buildings and a warehouse suffered extensive damage, while one hangar was destroyed and two others received major damage at the Ocala International Airport. At 05:20 UTC, approximately the same time as the Ocala tornado, another twister – rated F1 – touched down near LaCrosse. Several trees and power lines were downed and a few homes were destroyed, one from a propane explosion. One person was killed and four others received injuries. About 10 minutes later, another F2 twister was spawned near Howey-in-the-Hills. It moved through Mount Dora, destroying 13 homes, substantially damaging 80 homes, and inflicting minor damage on 266 homes. One person, a 5-month-old baby, was killed, while two others were injured.

At 05:30 UTC, a waterspout-turned F0 tornado tossed a 23 ft (7.0 m) sailboat about 300 ft (91 m) at the Davis Islands yacht club in Tampa, while five other boats broke loose from their cradles and twelve were smashed into the seawall. About 30 minutes later, an F1 tornado formed in Jacksonville, demolishing four dwellings and damaging sixteen others. Also at 06:00 UTC, an F0 tornado spawned near Bartow snapped a few trees and damaged a few doors. The final tornado developed in Jacksonville at 06:10 UTC. The twister damaged a few trees near the Jacksonville International Airport. At the airport itself, the tornado damaged several jetways and service vehicles, while a Boeing 737 was pushed about 40 ft (12 m).

A substantial storm surge was also generated along the gulf coast from Apalachee Bay in the Florida Panhandle to north of Tampa Bay. Due to the angle of the coast relative to the approaching squall, Taylor County along the eastern portion of Apalachee Bay and Hernando County north of Tampa were especially hard-hit.

Storm surges in those areas reached up to 12 feet (3.7 m), higher than many hurricanes. With little advance warning of incoming severe conditions, some coastal residents were awakened in the early morning of March 13 by the waters of the Gulf of Mexico rushing into their homes. More people died from drowning in this storm than during Hurricanes Hugo and Andrew combined. Overall, the storm's surge, winds, and tornadoes damaged or destroyed 18,000 homes. A total of 47 people died in Florida due to this storm.

Despite all the rainfall and tornadoes, lots of snow also dropped in the Panhandle regions of Florida. Areas saw snow of up to 1 foot near the coast and inland. In Tallahassee, around 1 to 2 inches of snow were dropped to the ground. In Jacksonville and Fernandina beach, traces of snow were seen in the air. Very cold temperatures were also seen in the state. Snow was seen as far south as Tampa Bay in central Florida. Tallahassee's lowest temperature was 17 degrees F (-8 degrees C). On March 13, Orlando saw 26 degrees F (-3 degrees C), and Miami saw 39 degrees F (4 degrees C) that same day. In Orlando, there were mixed precipitations with rain, sleet and snow combined. Miami saw near record cold temperatures for the month of March.

=== Cuba ===
In Cuba, wind gusts reached 100 mph (160 km/h) in the Havana area. A survey conducted by a research team from the Institute of Meteorology of Cuba suggests that the maximum winds could have been as high as 130 mph (210 km/h). It is the most damaging squall line ever recorded in Cuba.

There was widespread and significant damage in Cuba, with damage estimated as intense as F2. The squall line finally moved out of Cuba near sunrise, leaving 10 deaths and US$1 billion in damage on the island.

=== North Atlantic ===
The cargo ship Gold Bond Conveyor en route from Halifax, Nova Scotia, Canada to Tampa, Florida foundered in the Atlantic Ocean 60 nautical miles (110 kilometres) SE of Sable Island, Nova Scotia with the loss of all 33 crew. It is thought that water entered the hold where gypsum ore was being stored and caused the rock to shift and harden. This instability compounded with winds of 90 miles per hour (140 km/h) and 100-foot (30 m) waves led to her sinking. The Liberian-flagged ship was owned by Skaarup Shipping Corp., of Greenwich, Connecticut, and under charter to National Gypsum Co., a U.S. company. The ship had previously survived the Perfect Storm of 1991 two years earlier.

== Confirmed tornadoes ==
Confirmed tornadoes by Fujita rating
FU	F0	F1	F2	F3	F4	F5	Total
0	5	3	3	0	0	0	11

=== March 12 event ===
List of confirmed tornadoes – Friday, March 12, 1993
F#	Location	County / Parish	State	Start Coord. (Note: All starting coordinates are based on the NCEI database and may not reflect contemporary analyses)	Time	Path length	Width (Note: The listed width values are primarily the average/mean width of the tornadoes, with those having known maximum widths denoted by ♯. From 1952 to 1994, reports largely list mean width whereas contemporary years list maximum width. Values provided by Grazulis are the average width, with estimates being rounded down (i.e. 0.5 mi (0.80 km) is rounded down from 880 yards to 800 yards.)	Damage
F2	NW of Chiefland	Levy	FL	29.5°N 82.88°W	04:38–?	1 mi (1.6 km)	80 yd (73 m)	$50,000,000
F2	3 deaths – A tornado damaged or destroyed frame homes and trailers, crushing to death three people, including an aged individual. The tornado also felled trees and power lines. 10 injuries occurred.							
F1	E of Crystal River	Citrus	FL	28.9°N 82.57°W	04:38–?	0.5 mi (0.80 km)	30 yd (27 m)	$5,000,000
F1	This tornado damaged 15 homes, some severely. Three injuries occurred.							

=== March 13 event ===
List of confirmed tornadoes – Saturday, March 13, 1993
F#	Location	County / Parish	State	Start Coord.	Time	Path length	Width	Damage
F0	Treasure Island	Pinellas	FL	27.77°N 82.77°W	05:00–?	0.1 mi (0.16 km)	10 yd (9.1 m)	$50,000
F0	A waterspout moved onshore, damaging several homes and some boats. One of the homes was unroofed.							
F0	New Port Richey	Pasco	FL	28.25°N 82.72°W	05:04–?	0.1 mi (0.16 km)	10 yd (9.1 m)	—N/a
F0	A tornado damaged homes, slightly injuring 11 people.							
F2	Ocala	Marion	FL	29.08°N 82.23°W	05:20–05:37	15 mi (24 km)	100 yd (91 m)	$50,000,000
F2	Forming over woods, this tornado hit the Ocala Airport, destroying or damaging three hangars there. It splintered trees before hitting an industrial park, damaging a warehouse and other buildings.							
F1	N of LaCrosse	Alachua	FL	29.85°N 82.4°W	05:20–?	0.8 mi (1.3 km)	60 yd (55 m)	$5,000,000
F1	1 death – This tornado destroyed some frame homes, while downing power lines and trees. The death occurred in a trailer, along with four injuries.							
F2	NW of Howey-in-the-Hills to Mount Dora to E of Forest City	Lake	FL	28.68°N 81.77°W	05:30–?	30 mi (48 km)	200 yd (180 m)	$5,000,000
F2	1 death – This narrow, swift tornado destroyed or damaged 359 homes, killing a person in a trailer. 60 injuries occurred.							
F0	Tampa	Hillsborough	FL	27.98°N 82.47°W	05:30–?	0.1 mi (0.16 km)	10 yd (9.1 m)	$500
F0	A waterspout hit a yacht club at Davis Islands, lofting a 23-foot-long (7.0 m) sailboat 300 ft (91 m), casting a dozen others against a seawall, and pushing five boats off their cradles.							
F1	Jacksonville (1st tornado)	Duval	FL	30.35°N 81.67°W	06:00–?	0.8 mi (1.3 km)	50 yd (46 m)	$5,000,000
F1	This tornado destroyed or damaged 20 homes.							
F0	S of Bartow to S of Lakeland	Polk	FL	27.88°N 81.83°W	06:00–06:10	0.1 mi (0.16 km)	10 yd (9.1 m)	$500
F0	This tornado broke off trees and dislodged doors.							
F0	Jacksonville (2nd tornado)	Duval	FL	30.35°N 81.67°W	06:10–?	0.1 mi (0.16 km)	10 yd (9.1 m)	$500,000
F0	Developing near Jacksonville Airport, this tornado splintered trees. It then hit the airport, damaging service vehicles and jetways, while moving a Boeing 737 40 ft (12 m).							

== See also ==
- Braer Storm
- List of derecho events
- Great Flood of 1993
- Hurricane Sandy (2012) – Caused similar snowfall totals over the Northeast almost 20 years later.
- Early 2014 North American cold wave
- Snowmageddon
- January 2016 North American blizzard
- February 13–17, 2021 North American winter storm – The costliest winter storm on record, also killed 200+ people
- The Day After Tomorrow – Uses archive footage of the 1993 storm

== Sources ==
- Agee, Ernest M.; Childs, Samuel (June 1, 2014). "Adjustments in Tornado Counts, F-Scale Intensity, and Path Width for Assessing Significant Tornado Destruction". Journal of Applied Meteorology and Climatology. 53 (6). American Meteorological Society: 1494–1505. doi:10.1175/JAMC-D-13-0235.1.
- Brooks, Harold E. (April 2004). "On the Relationship of Tornado Path Length and Width to Intensity". Weather and Forecasting. 19 (2): 310–19. Bibcode:2004WtFor..19..310B. doi:10.1175/1520-0434(2004)019<0310:OTROTP>2.0.CO;2.
- Grazulis, Thomas P. (November 1990). Significant Tornadoes 1880–1989. Vol. 2. St. Johnsbury, Vermont: The Tornado Project of Environmental Films. ISBN 1-879362-02-3.
  - — (January 1997). Significant Tornadoes Update, 1992–1995. St. Johnsbury, Vermont: The Tornado Project of Environmental Films. ISBN 1-879362-04-X.
- National Weather Service (March 1993). Storm Data Publication (Report). National Centers for Environmental Information – via Storm Events Database.
