= Conjurer's Neck Archeological District =

Archaeological site in Virginia, United States

- U.S. National Register of Historic Places
- U.S. Historic district
- Virginia Landmarks Register
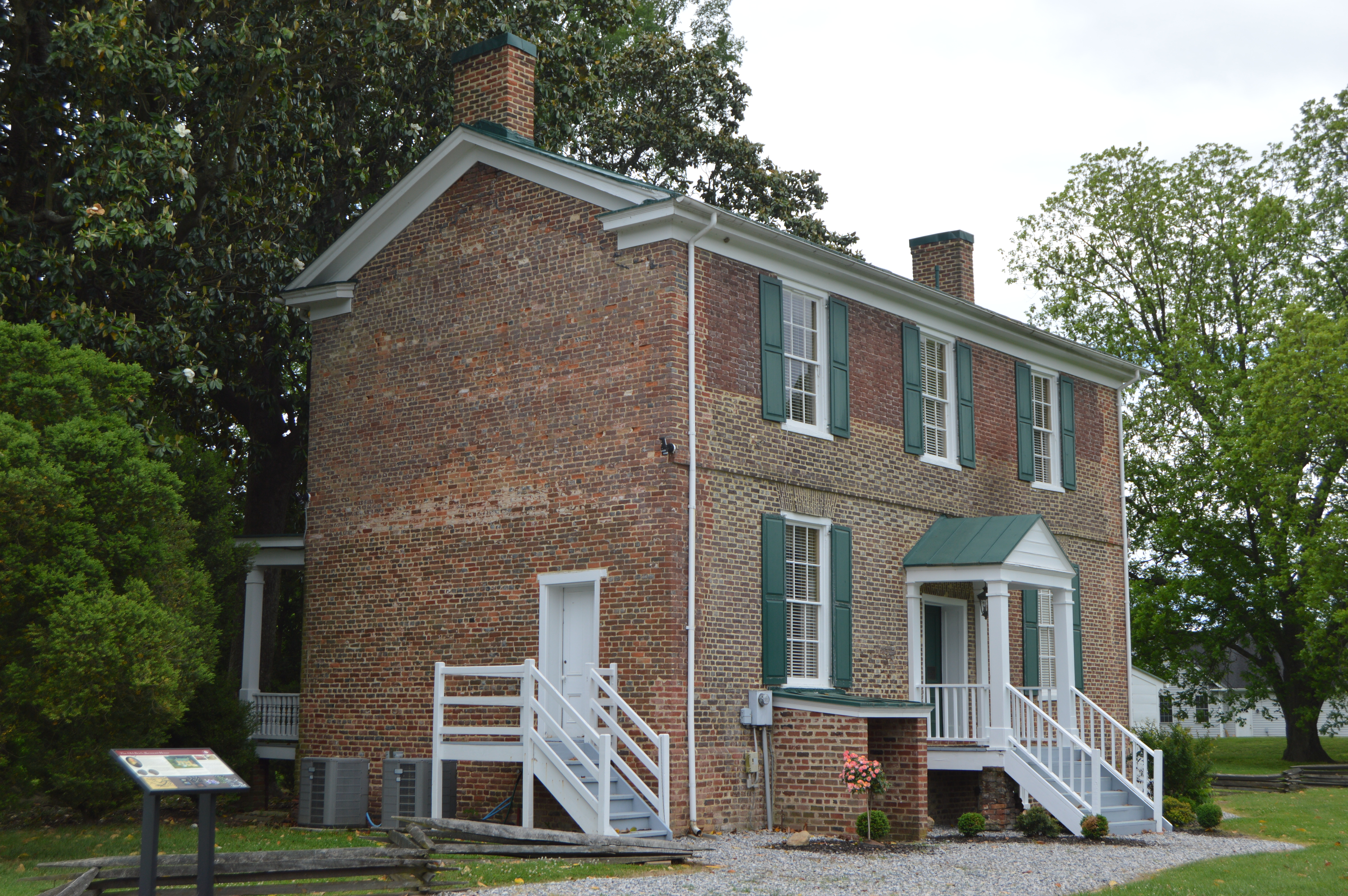
- The Kennon House
- Location: Address Restricted, Colonial Heights, Virginia
- Area: 8.3 acres (3.4 ha)
- Built: 1725-1750, 1879
- Architectural style: Georgian
- NRHP reference No.: 03001090
- VLR No.: 106-0002

Significant dates
- Added to NRHP: October 23, 2003
- Designated VLR: June 18, 2003

Conjurer's Neck Archeological District is a set of two historic archaeological sites and national historic district located at Colonial Heights, Virginia. The district includes the previously listed Conjurer's Field Archeological Site prehistoric village site (44CF20) and the site of a Colonial-period plantation house, known as the Kennon House or Old Brick House (44CF646). The original house was built between 1725 and 1750, and rebuilt in 1879 after a fire. The site possesses undisturbed and stratified cultural features dating to the late 1700s and afterward.

It was listed on the National Register of Historic Places in 2003.
