= Chesterfield Highlands Historic District =

Historic district in Virginia, United States

- U.S. National Register of Historic Places
- U.S. Historic district
- Virginia Landmarks Register
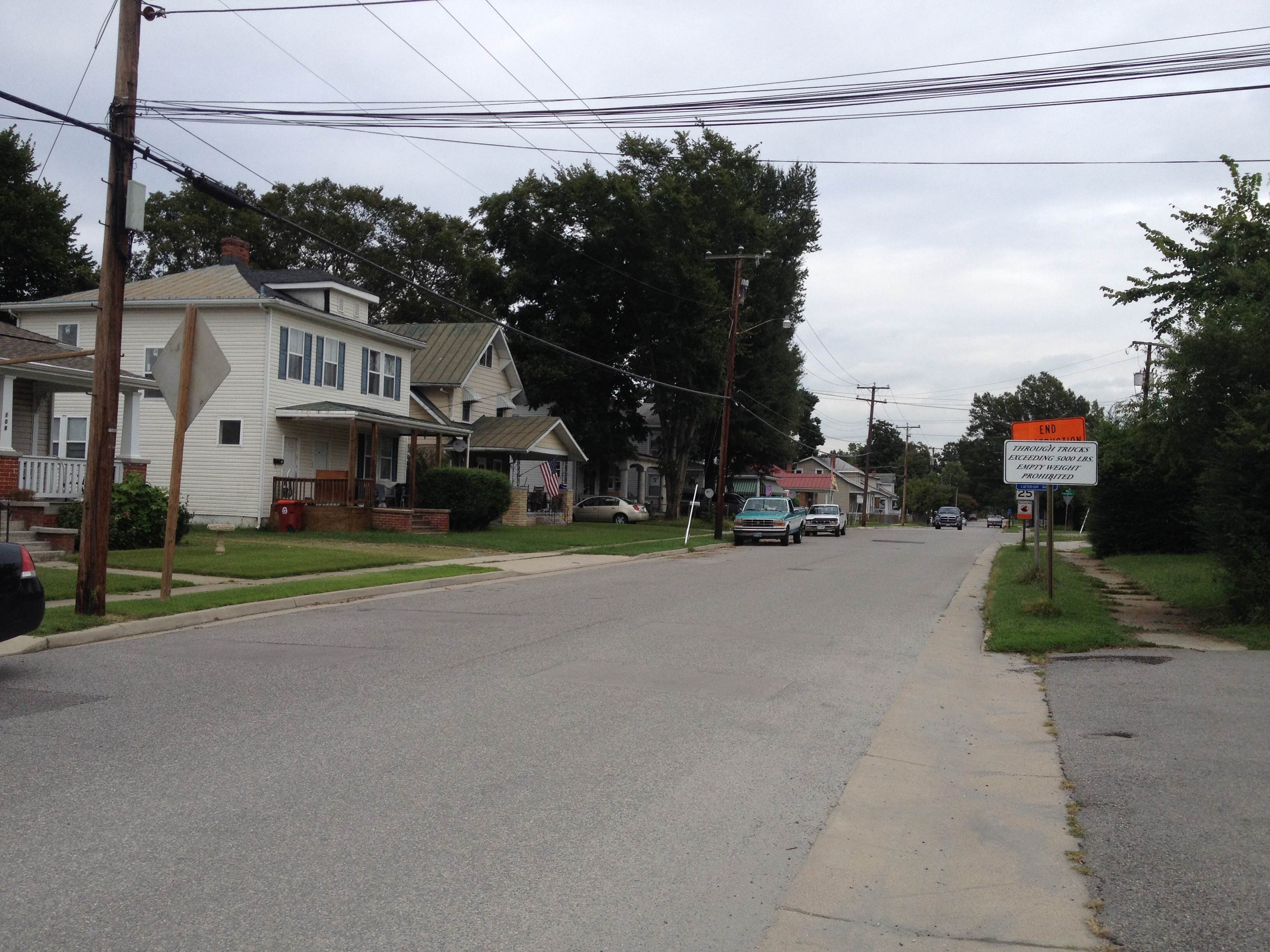

- Location within Virginia Location within the United States
- Location: Roughly bounded by the Boulevard, E. Westover, Lafayette, Pickwick, Danville & Lee Aves., Colonial Heights, Virginia
- Coordinates: 37°14′54″N 77°24′26″W
- Area: 140 acres (57 ha)
- Built: 1916
- Built by: Webb, Walter; Boisseau, Leon J.
- Architectural style: Late 19th and early 20th century revivals, Late 19th and early 20th century American movements
- NRHP reference No.: 13000540
- VLR No.: 106-5063

Significant dates
- Added to NRHP: July 23, 2013
- Designated VLR: December 13, 2012

Chesterfield Highlands Historic District is a national historic district located at Colonial Heights, Virginia. The district encompasses 305 contributing buildings and 1 contributing structure. The district was developed in the early decades of the 20th century as a carefully planned middle-class neighborhood in a gridiron plan. The primarily residential district includes dwellings in a variety of popular late 19th and early 20th century architectural styles. Located in the district are the Highland Methodist Episcopal Church (1920), Immanuel Baptist Church (1932), and Colonial Heights Presbyterian Church (1950).

It was listed on the National Register of Historic Places in 2013.
