= 1993 Virginia tornado outbreak =

Weather event in the United States

Meteorological history
- Duration: August 6, 1993

Tornado outbreak
- Tornadoes: 24
- Max. rating: F4 tornado
- Duration: ~4 hours

Overall effects
- Fatalities: 4
- Injuries: 251
- Damage: $72 million
- Areas affected: North Carolina, Virginia

The 1993 Virginia tornado outbreak was a tornado outbreak that occurred in the Southeastern United States on August 6, 1993. It was very rare in that most tornado outbreaks in this region occur in the spring.

== Confirmed tornadoes ==
Confirmed tornadoes by Fujita rating
FU	F0	F1	F2	F3	F4	F5	Total
0	3	16	2	1	1	0	23

F#	Location	County	Time (UTC)	Path length	Damage
Virginia
F2	NE of Kenbridge to NW of Colonial Heights	Lunenburg, Nottoway, Dinwiddie, Chesterfield	1643	38 miles (60.8 km)	Tornado touched down near Kenbridge as an F0, blowing the roofs off of a briquette factory and a furniture company. The tornado reached F1 intensity in Nottoway County, leveling trees, outbuildings, and barns. A house was damaged as well. The tornado crossed into Dinwiddie County and further intensified into an F2 as it struck the town of Ford, where a house lost its second story, telephone poles and large trees were downed, and a wooden shed was leveled. The tornado caused F0 damage in Chesterfield County before dissipating.
F4	SW of Petersburg to NE of Hopewell	Dinwiddie, Prince George, Chesterfield	1730	12 miles (19.6 km)	4 deaths – See section on this tornado
F1	N of Colonial Heights to SW of Talleysville	Chesterfield, Henrico, Charles City, New Kent	1740	14 miles (22.4 km)	Tornado first moved through a subdivision, causing roof and window damage and downing numerous trees. The tornado then crossed the James River and struck the Varina-Enon bridge, flipping several vehicles. Minor tree damage occurred elsewhere. Five people were injured.
F1	SE of Roxbury to N of Providence Forge	Charles City, New Kent	1800	6.5 miles (10.4 km)	Tornado caused extensive tree damage and destroyed two mobile homes.
F1	NE of Providence Forge	New Kent	1815	4.8 miles (7.7 km)	Many trees were downed in rural areas. Tornado was up to a half-mile wide at times.
F1	W of Courtland	Southampton	1820	1 miles (1.6 km)	Trees were uprooted and a shed was destroyed.
F1	Sussex to E of Waverly	Sussex	1827	14 miles (22.4 km)	Tornado struck Waverly, where trees were snapped/uprooted and chimneys were knocked over. A branch was found driven into the siding of one home. A poorly built metal peanut warehouse was destroyed as well.
F1	SW of Spring	Surry	1835	2.5 miles (4 km)	Trees were snapped and uprooted, metal roofing was torn from a shed, and two vehicles were damaged. Three houses were damaged, including one that lost its chimney.
F1	W of Surry	Surry	1835	5 miles (4 km)	An apartment building lost part of its roof and much of its siding. Trees were downed and a car had its windows blown out as well.
F1	SE of Williamsburg	James City, York	1850	8 miles (12.8 km)	Near the beginning of the path, the tornado snapped pine trees, and destroyed a bathhouse and a recreational building. The tornado then rolled 5 mobile homes at a trailer park, flattened a large metal building, and threw a storage trailer. After crossing Highway 60, the tornado moved into York County, where trees were blown onto buildings at the Naval Weapons Station.
F0	Franklin area	Isle of Wight	1900	0.3 km (0.5 km)	Brief tornado with no damage.
F3	S of Urbana	Middlesex	1900	2.9 miles (4.6 km)	Tornado snapped trees, damaged a barn, and overturned a travel trailer. Listed as an F0 on the NWS Sterling survey page, and the NCDC listing as an F3 may be erroneous.
F1	Newport News to Hampton	James City	1910	12 miles (19.2 km)	In Newport News, the tornado blew trees onto homes and tore apart a poorly built flea market. Sheet metal was found wrapped around trees. In Hampton, the tornado overturned a portable classroom at a high school, and tore air conditioning units from the roof of a grocery store. At Langley Air Force Base, the tornado damaged several F-15s and a storage building.
F0	White Stone area	Lancaster	1915	1 miles (1.6 km)	Trees were blown onto homes.
F1	N of Suffolk	Suffolk	1930	2 miles (3.2 km)	Four homes were damaged and several trees were knocked down. Two homes under construction were moved several feet from their foundations.
F1	Kiptopeke area	Northampton	1950	0.5 miles (0.8 km)	Tornado struck Kiptopeke State Park, snapping multiple trees along the path. Picnic tables were thrown, and a 20-foot ornamental boat was thrown 120 feet. A construction trailer and another trailer were overturned as well.
F2	Chesapeake area	Chesapeake	2000	2.5 miles (4 km)	Tornado moved through Chesapeake, damaging at least 35 homes. Some homes lost large sections of their roofs, and a brick two-car garage was destroyed. Trees were snapped and uprooted, some of which landed on homes.
F1	SE of Virginia Beach	Virginia Beach	2045	1.5 miles (2.4 km)	Tornado began as a waterspout and moved ashore, causing tree and roof damage. One house had its roof blown off.
North Carolina
F1	Grantham area	Wayne	unknown	unknown	This tornado damaged the roofs of 6 homes, the roof of a school, and four hangars at a local airport. Several barns and numerous trees were damaged as well.
F1	Ponzer area	Hyde	1900	0.5 miles (0.8 km)	Homes sustained roof damage, and outbuildings were damaged.
F1	Swanquarter area	Hyde	1910	0.7 miles (1.1 km)	A house was destroyed, and another was damaged.
F0	Engelhard area	Hyde	1945	0.2 miles (0.32 km)	A house roof and satellite dish antenna were damaged.
F1	Pantego area	Beaufort	2030	0.5 miles (0.8 km)	A two-car garage and home were damaged, and a tobacco barn was destroyed.
Sources: NOAA Storm Data, Tornado History Project Storm Data - August 6, 1993

=== Petersburg–Colonial Heights–Hopewell, Virginia ===
Petersburg–Colonial Heights–Hopewell, Virginia
F4 tornado
- on the Fujita scale

Overall effects
- Fatalities: 4
- Injuries: 246

This destructive tornado touched down on the southwest side of Petersburg, and rapidly intensified as it struck the historic downtown area of the city. Several well-built, multi-story brick buildings were leveled, along with a train station. A decorative caboose near the train station was ripped from its anchors and thrown 20 feet, pulling the anchors out of the ground in the process. Damage in downtown Petersburg was rated as F4. The tornado then moved through the Pocahontas Island neighborhood at F3 intensity, heavily damaging or destroying 47 homes and a church. A total of 100 buildings were damaged or destroyed in Petersburg. The tornado then crossed into Colonial Heights, severely damaging a strip mall, a K-mart, and a waterbed store. A Wal-Mart was destroyed, with three fatalities occurring at that location. Many cars in the parking lot were tossed and destroyed as well. Damage in Colonial Heights was rated as low-end F3. The tornado then crossed into Prince George County at F2 intensity, striking a sand and gravel company. Several cars and trucks were overturned, the second floor of a cinder-block building was destroyed, conveyor belts were twisted and overturned, and one person was killed at that location. Many trees were downed throughout the county. The tornado then struck the north side of Hopewell at F1 intensity, where it blew roofs off of an apartment complex. The tornado caused minor damage to an additional 49 homes, major damage to 13 homes and destroyed two other homes in Hopewell. The tornado exited Hopewell, weakened to an F0, and dissipated in Charles City County. From start to finish, this storm caused 4 deaths and 246 injuries. It was the deadliest Virginia tornado since 10 people were killed in Ivy on September 30, 1959. It was also the first recorded F4 tornado in Virginia state history. For a number of years afterwards, the remains of a damage swath (sheared, twisted and broken vegetation) through thick trees was visible along the west side of I-95 on the immediate north side of the Appomattox crossing. Perhaps one of the longest lasting reminders of the tornado was on the Martin Luther King Jr. Bridge between Colonial Heights and Petersburg. As the tornado had smashed through the historic district, it ripped a traffic light off the bridge, and the snapped pillars remained until the bridge was replaced in 2002. As a result of the damage that occurred, a state of emergency was issued for Petersburg.

== See also ==
- List of North American tornadoes and tornado outbreaks
