= Violet Bank Museum =

- Violet Bank
- U.S. National Register of Historic Places
- Virginia Landmarks Register
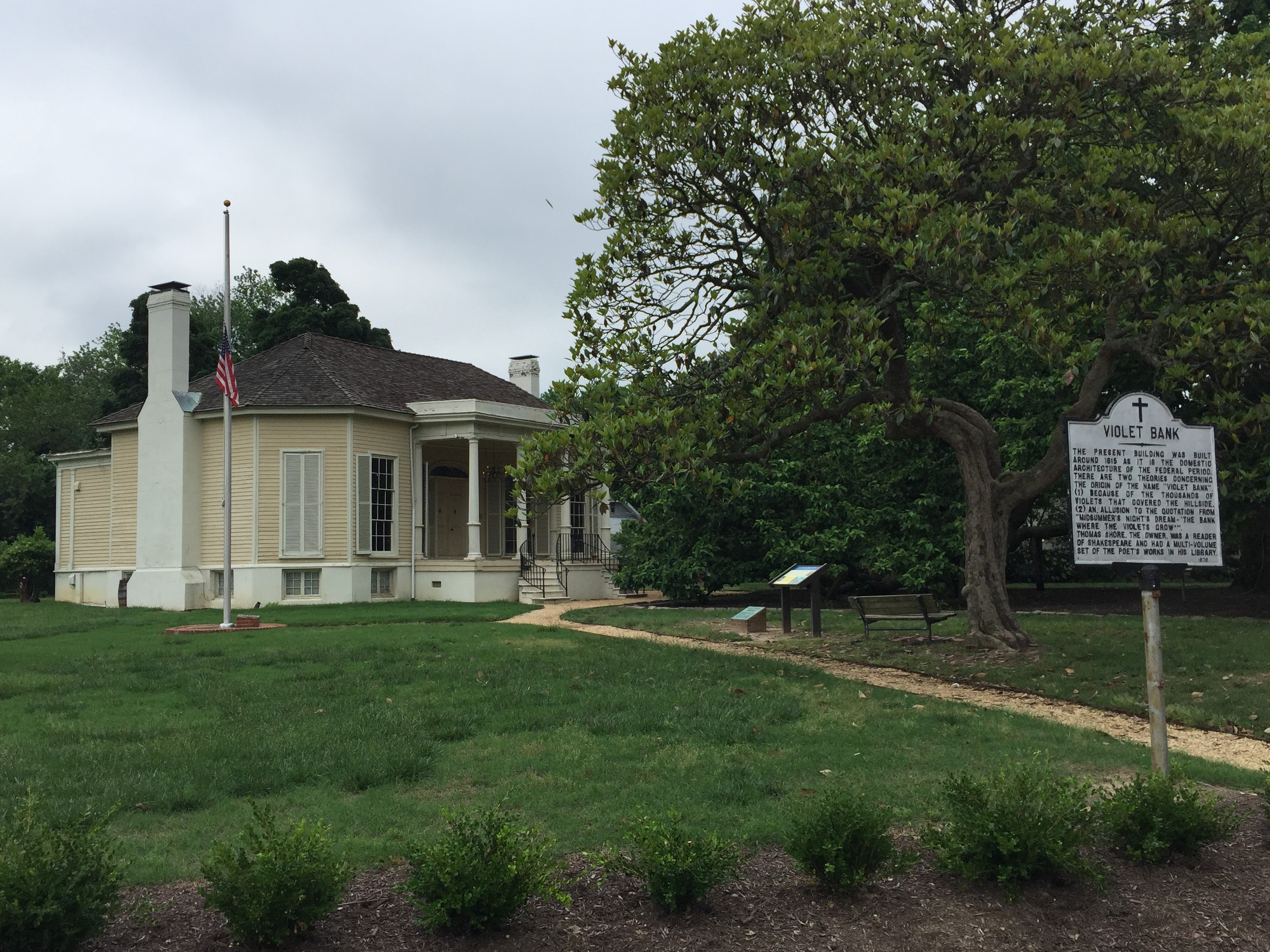
- Violet Bank Museum

- Location within Virginia Location within the United States
- Location: Royal Oak Ave., Colonial Heights, Virginia
- Coordinates: 37°14′30″N 77°24′19″W
- Area: less than one acre
- Built: 1815
- Architectural style: Federal
- NRHP reference No.: 74002234
- VLR No.: 106-0003

Significant dates
- Added to NRHP: July 30, 1974
- Designated VLR: April 16, 1974

Violet Bank is a historic plantation house and museum in Colonial Heights, Virginia. It was listed on the National Register of Historic Places in 1974.

== History ==
The development of the estate began in 1777, when Thomas Shore purchased 144 acres atop "Archers Hill" from the heirs of John Martin. The first house was completed in 1778. Violet Bank originally fit an almost canonized two-over-two centre hall plan typical of late colonial Tidewater Virginia. This house served as General Gilbert du Motier, marquis de Lafayette's Headquarters at the beginning of the 1781 summer campaign in the South, which eventually ended in Cornwallis' capitulation at the Siege of Yorktown.

There were two American Revolutionary War actions fought on the hillside. The first was in March 1781 under Friedrich Wilhelm von Steuben and his Virginia Militia; the second in April 1781, under Gilbert du Motier, Marquis de Lafayette. Both of these were actions against British Major General William Phillips, who mentioned the property in a dispatch: "We assaulted the enemy's work across the river and attempted to gain the high ground adjacent to Thomas Shore's house, but were repulsed with heavy losses." The British casualties were approx. 200.

Phillips' objectives were to capture the crucial river crossing on the Appomattox, and gain control over the Turnpike. Not only was Petersburg the only major thoroughfare through Southside Central Virginia that would facilitate troop movement, it was also the primary access road for Chesterfield Courthouse, a primary supply depot and one of three training grounds for the Continental Line in Virginia.

Phillips became ill, and subsequently died, buried in an unmarked grave, lest the rebels desecrate his resting place. He is the second highest ranking British officer buried outside Great Britain. Cornwallis then acceded to command. Lacking sufficient strength to overwhelm Lafayette on the Heights, Cornwallis decided to abandon Virginia and campaign farther south.

Violet Bank would once again play host to Lafayette in 1824, when he visited the country for the last time as an official guest of the United States. During the interim between General Lafayette's two visits, Violet Bank's appearance was completely altered. It was described in the Mutual Assurance of Society of Virginia papers of 1796 as a "two-story clapboard structure w/addition in which there was a cellar floored in stone w/kitchen". Violet Bank originally bore a strong resemblance to the still extant Weston Manor in Hopewell, Virginia. Benjamin Latrobe intended on lodging at Violet Bank, "but he (Thomas Shore) is at present building, and occupies his offices only, which, in Virginia, follows a plantation house as a litter of pigs to their mother."

The house caught fire in 1810, supposedly on a Sunday whilst the family was away at church. Thomas Shore would occupy the house for 22 years until his death in 1800, leaving behind a much younger wife and three daughters, the oldest of whom was four at the time. The "Widder Jane Grey" would remarry in 1804, Henry Haxall of Haxall Mills. They and the three girls were the residents when the house burned, the cellar kitchen being a likely culprit. The chimney stacks and foundation survived the fire, which was somewhat unusual since the lime mortar used during the period did not generally withstand the intense heat that a house fire would generate and would be "cooked out".

From 1810 to 1815 the house was rebuilt; the front foundation was altered, a radically different superstructure was built atop the first Violet Banks foundation, and an entirely new main house was constructed. Enter Benjamin Latrobe again, or at least his designs. Latrobe in all probability made the acquaintance of Jane Grey Shore Haxall when he visited Petersburg in 1796 and went to the horse races with Thomas Shore on April 21 of that year according to his Journal. He dined with Thomas' brother Dr. John Shore on the 22nd. Latrobe's notation for the 23rd stated that he had gotten into Shore's house and was "much more comfortable than in the buzz of betting at the track." Whether he meant Dr. Johns residence or Thomas' is unclear.

The consensus of most architectural historians is that Violet Bank was designed by a pupil of Latrobe's, although there is nothing that suggests that Robert Mills (architect) might have had a hand in its planning. The possibility also exists that Violet Bank is, like Point of Honor in Lynchburg, the product of a country builder who was familiar with Latrobe's work in Richmond, and used that as a base from which to start, through the house could be right out of a Latrobe sketchbook with its combination of octagonal bays, recessed portico and Adam-style ceiling moulding.

There are quite a number of shared characteristics between Violet Bank and a known Latrobe house, that of Michael Hancock built Ca. 1808-09. Henry Haxall would, at least, have been familiar with this fashionable house on the corner of 5th & Main in Richmond, as well as the architectural trend in Richmond which this house embodied. Jane Grey, having met the man, was likely to have passing knowledge of Latrobe's architectural ideas. A quick perusal of the inventory for Henry Haxalls' will probate clearly indicates a man of taste concerned with fashion. Mr. & Mrs. Haxall were certainly wealthy enough to have hired Latrobe, and if they did not consult with him on rebuilding project, they must probably asked him to suggest an architect, he would have named one of his own pupils.

Whoever the architect was, his reuse of the existing foundation and chimney stacks make the architectural solution more idiosyncratic. Normally an architect starts with a blank page, however, in this case, the architect was forced to deal with fixed points and proportions. The second floor fireboxes were bricked up, the second floor was eliminated, which enabled the ceilings to be raised. All masonry was stuccoed & scored to resemble ashlar and to hide the difference in brickwork that the modifications necessitated.

The tripartite foundation plan lent itself naturally to a strict Vitruvian construct. The peculiar ring to be founded on third the distance up each Portico column, unique to Virginia architecture, form the keynote that coalesces the structure into a harmonious whole & unlocks the architectural formula.

Henry Haxall died in 1834, the same year as his eldest step-daughter married Dr. John Gilliam. Thomas Shore's middle daughter Marie Louisa married Dr. William Shippen II of Philadelphia. The youngest, Jane Grey, died at the age of 15 without issue. The estate passed to the Gilliams' upon the death of Jane Haxall, eleven years after her husband, in 1834. Violet Bank would remain in the Gilliam Family's hands until 1873. At the time of its occupation by the Headquarters of the Army of Northern Virginia, the title to Violet Bank was held in deed of trust by Thomas Gilliam, Thomas Shore's grandson.

Part of the Main house also served as a hospital during the siege. The war largely impoverished the Gilliam family, and the house was sold in 1873 to a cousin, Mrs. Evelyn Gasquet Marshall of New York. She would occupy the house until her death in 1885, when the property was acquired by Capt. Abel N. Haskins. His heirs, in turn, sold houses and remaining 68 acres to the Greater Petersburg Realty Corporation in 1905. Operating Violet Bank as a dairy farm, the new owners knocked out walls on the first floor of the main house in order to utilize the structure as a cattle barn. Greater Petersburg Reality Corp. CEO Bellamy decided in the late 1914 to subdivide the farm and develop it for housing, and work began in 1915. The first thing Bellamy did in breaking up the property was tear down the main house, leaving the extant portion remaining.

The much reduced Violet Bank would be one of the first houses sold in River view sub-division. It was purchased in 1919 by Mrs. Alice Pierrepont who resided there until 1948, at which time she sold it to American Legion Post 284. The City of Colonial Heights acquired the house in 1959, first for the Chamber of Commerce, then as Colonial Heights first public library. It was listed on the National Register of Historic Places in 1974. Now a part of the Recreation & Parks department, Violet Bank began its current incarnation as an active Historic House Museum in 1988.

Violet Bank Museum is a superb document of Federal design and American Interior Decorative Arts. It is on the National Register of Historic Places and a Virginia Historic Landmark.

== See also ==
- National Register of Historic Places listings in Colonial Heights, Virginia
