= Colonial Heights, Virginia =

Independent city in Virginia, United States

Colonial Heights
- Independent city
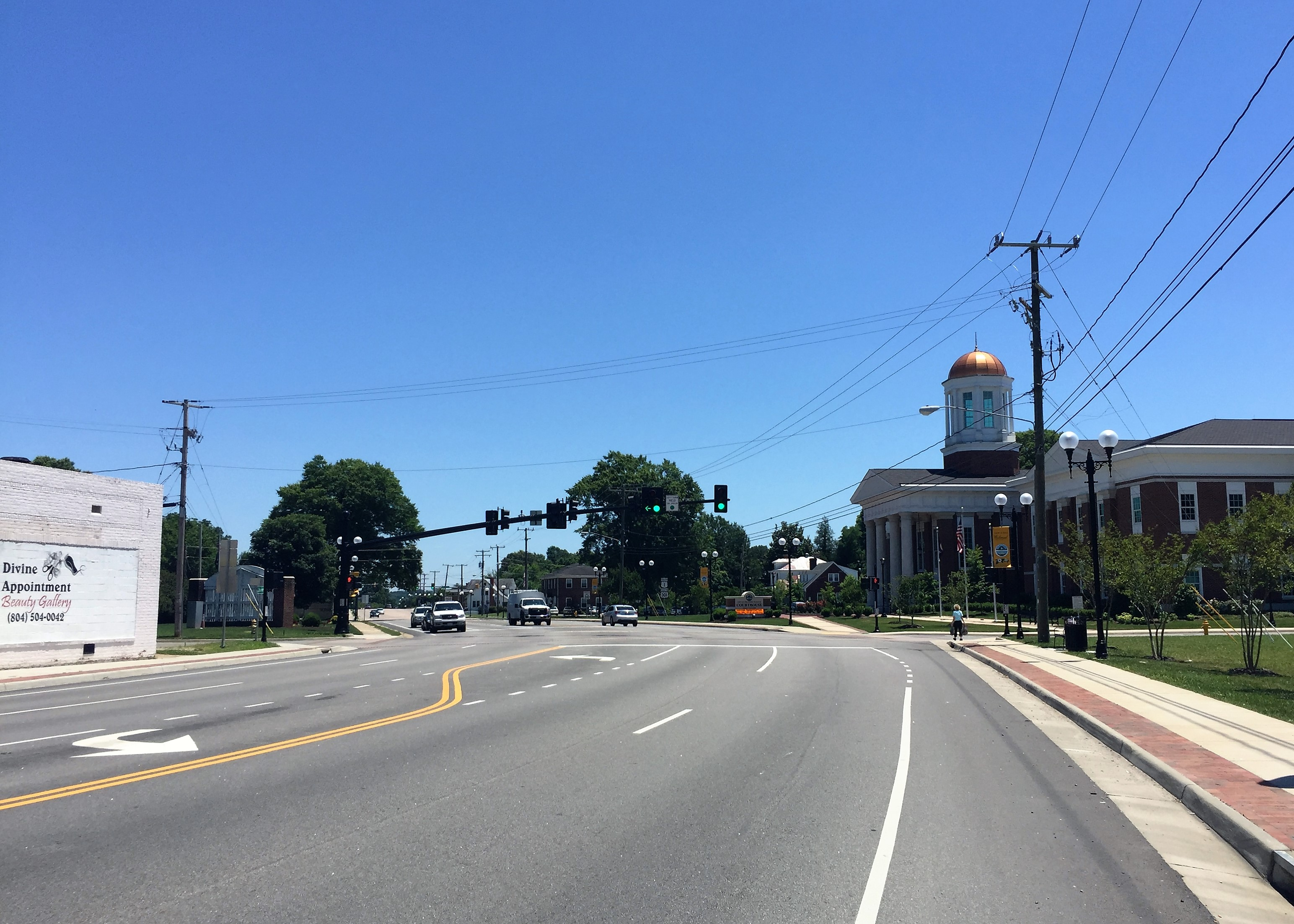
- Boulevard, in Colonial Heights, Virginia

- Flag Seal

- Location in the State of Virginia
- Coordinates: 37°14′38″N 77°24′38″W
- Country: United States
- State: Virginia
- County: None (Independent city)
- Incorporated (town): 1926
- Incorporated (city): 1948

Government
  - Mayor: Greg Kochuba (I)

Area
  - Total: 7.80 sq mi (20.19 km^{2})
  - Land: 7.52 sq mi (19.48 km^{2})
  - Water: 0.27 sq mi (0.71 km^{2}) 3.7%
- Elevation: 95 ft (29 m)

Population (2020)
  - Total: 18,170
  - Estimate (2025): 18,738 ▲
  - Density: 2,416/sq mi (932.8/km^{2})
- Time zone: UTC-5 (EST)
  - Summer (DST): UTC-4 (EDT)
- ZIP Code: 23834
- Area code: 804
- FIPS code: 51-18448
- GNIS feature ID: 1496852
- Website: colonialheightsva.gov

Colonial Heights is an independent city in the Commonwealth of Virginia. As of the 2020 census, the population was 18,170. The Bureau of Economic Analysis combines the City of Colonial Heights (along with the City of Petersburg) with Dinwiddie County for statistical purposes.

Colonial Heights is located in the Tri-Cities area of the Richmond Metropolitan Statistical Area (MSA).

== History ==
Like much of eastern Virginia at contact, the site of Colonial Heights was governed by the Powhatan Confederacy, ruled by Chief Powhatan, when the English colonists arrived at Jamestown on May 14, 1607. Captain John Smith's early map of Virginia testifies that the present area of Colonial Heights included the principal town of the Appamattuck tribe, led by their Weroance, Coquonasum, and his sister, Oppussoquionuske. In the aftermath of the confederacy's attacks in 1622 and 1644, the Appamattuck became tributary to England and relocated to nearby Ettrick, and its opposite bank, near Fort Henry (within modern-day Petersburg, Virginia).

The area including present-day Colonial Heights was made a part of "Henrico Cittie", one of 4 huge "incorporations" formed in the Virginia Colony in 1619 by the London Company. English colonists first settled in the Colonial Heights area in 1620. A small group sailed up the Appomattox River looking for clear land, and finally settled in an area where Swift Creek runs into the Appomattox River, which they named Conjurer's Neck. This confluence was formerly the residence of a Native American healer (known as a "conjurer") who was thought to have cast spells over the waters.

Shortly thereafter, Charles Magnor registered the first land patent in the area for 650 acres (2.6 km^{2}), which he later developed into a plantation before selling it in 1634. That same year, by order of King Charles I of England, the Virginia Colony was divided into the 8 original shires of Virginia by the House of Burgesses, one of which was Henrico County, which included the future land of Colonial Heights.

In 1635, the English had a small town called Appamattucks near the "Old Towne" Creek. Also in that year, Captain Henry Fleet and Francis Poythress built a small fort nearby, on "Fleet's Hill" just west of the current city, now occupied by the campus of Virginia State University.

During the period from 1677 to 1685, one of the area's historic landmarks was constructed with the building of the Old Brick House. Richard Kennon came to Virginia prior to 1670 and became a merchant of Bermuda Hundred. He represented Henrico County in the House of Burgesses. His son, Richard Kennon, Jr., was also a member of the House of Burgesses and married the daughter of Col. Robert Bolling, the emigrant, and his second wife, the former Anne Stith. Richard's sister, Mary Kennon, was married to Major John Fairfax Bolling, half-brother of Richard's wife. Major Bolling was the son of Col. Robert Bolling and his first wife Jane Rolfe, who was granddaughter of the early colonist John Rolfe and his Native American wife, Pocahontas. The Bollings lived at Cobb's, a plantation in eastern Chesterfield near Point-of-Rocks.

The plantation house built by Richard Kennon (later known as the "Brick House") is now thought to be the oldest permanent structure in Colonial Heights. One wall of the house survived a fire in 1879, and the rest was rebuilt.

In 1749, an area south of the James River was divided from Henrico County by the House of Burgesses and named Chesterfield County. The area which became Colonial Heights was to remain in Chesterfield County for almost 200 more years, until 1948.

The name "Colonial Heights” comes from the American Revolutionary War. In May 1781, Continental Army troops under the General Marquis de Lafayette advanced south from Richmond and deployed artillery on the heights overlooking Petersburg from across the Appomattox River. Legend indicates that an English soldier stationed in Petersburg, upon seeing Lafayette’s troops across the river, exclaimed, “Look! There are the Colonials, up on the Heights!” The area thereafter came to be known as "Colonial Heights", and the name was given to a subdivision of the Oak Hill tract in 1906.

A historic site, Oak Hill, on Carroll Avenue, also called Archer's, Hector's, or Dunn's Hill, consisted of two one-story weatherboarded structures connected by a deep inside porch that extends from an uncovered section toward the street. From the lawn of this house, in May 1781, General Lafayette — with cannon behind a boxwood hedge that still fringes the hill — shelled Petersburg, then occupied by British troops under Major-General William Phillips (who died of typhoid during this bombardment).

The area also became involved in operations during the American Civil War. General Robert E. Lee made his headquarters at Violet Bank from June through September during the Siege of Petersburg in 1864.

In 1926, Colonial Heights became an incorporated town in Chesterfield County. Originally seeking to be annexed by the City of Petersburg, in the face of overwhelming public support, a judge's ruling instead saw Colonial Heights designated an incorporated town.

It was incorporated as a city in 1948; under Virginia law, it separated from Chesterfield County and became an independent city. Its current charter was granted in 1960. From 1960 to 1970, Colonial Heights experienced a period of rapid growth as the population jumped from 9,587 to 15,097.

In the mid-1980s, completion of the State Route 144 (Temple Avenue Connector) and a new bridge across the Appomattox River provided access to State Route 36 near Fort Lee. The new road and bridge effectively opened a large previously isolated tract of land along the southeastern edge of the city for commercial development. There, the regional Southpark Mall and many other retail businesses and offices were built.

On August 6, 1993, an F4 tornado (max. wind speeds 207-260 mph) passed through Colonial Heights. It caused extensive damage to the Southpark Mall and collapsed the roof of an old Wal-Mart (now Sam's Club) store. It also did extensive damage in Petersburg and Hopewell. In the Tri-Cities area, the tornado killed four people (three in Wal-Mart and one in Prince George), injured 246, and caused an estimated $50 million in property damage.

On April 28, 2008, an EF1 tornado (max. wind speeds 86-110 mph) produced a near two miles (3.2 km) long, though discontinuous, path through Colonial Heights. The tornado first touched down near the Colonial Heights Middle School football field, damaging the field clubhouse roof, then causing roof damage and spill onto I-95 from Medallion Pool business. The tornado then jumped I-95 and touched down again in the Dimmock Square Shopping Center. Several cars were flipped and piled in the parking lot of a strip mall (which had extensive roof damage) that is less than a tenth of a mile from the site of the old Walmart which was destroyed by an F4 tornado on August 6, 1993. The tornado then continued across Temple Avenue, causing tree and roof damage in the neighborhood near Fine Drive and Puddledock Road (in Prince George County) before lifting for good. The tornado injured 21 and caused an estimated $10 million in property damage.

== Historical attractions ==
Three area attractions with historic roots are Violet Bank and Swift Creek Mill. There are also several parks in the area, including Fort Clifton Park, Dimmock Boat landing, and White Bank Park.

== Geography ==
According to The Comparative Guide to American Suburbs, Colonial Heights's elevation is 95 feet.

Colonial Heights is located at 37°15′44″N 77°24′9″W (37.262257, -77.402728).

According to the United States Census Bureau, the city has a total area of 7.8 square miles (20.2 km^{2}), of which 7.5 square miles (19.4 km^{2}) is land and 0.3 square miles (0.8 km^{2}) of it (3.7%) is water.

Colonial Heights is located on the Appomattox River and north of the modern-day City of Petersburg at the river's fall line. It is located south of Chesterfield County (practically surrounded by it except for a south border with Petersburg); in some areas, Swift Creek divides the city from the county.

=== Adjacent county / Independent city ===
- Chesterfield County – west, north, southeast (Appomattox River islands)
- Petersburg – south
- Prince George County – east
- Hopewell – north

== Demographics ==
Historical population
Census	Pop.	Note	%±
1930	2,331		—
1940	3,194		37.0%
1950	6,077		90.3%
1960	9,587		57.8%
1970	15,097		57.5%
1980	16,509		9.4%
1990	16,064		−2.7%
2000	16,897		5.2%
2010	17,411		3.0%
2020	18,170		4.4%
2025 (est.)	18,738	▲	3.1%
U.S. Decennial Census; 1790-1960 1900-1990; 1990-2000 2010-2020

=== Racial and ethnic composition ===
Colonial Heights city, Virginia – Racial and ethnic composition Note: the US Census treats Hispanic/Latino as an ethnic category. This table excludes Latinos from the racial categories and assigns them to a separate category. Hispanics/Latinos may be of any race.
Race / Ethnicity (NH = Non-Hispanic)	Pop 1980	Pop 1990	Pop 2000	Pop 2010	Pop 2020	% 1980	% 1990	% 2000	% 2010	% 2020
White alone (NH)	16,069	15,398	14,920	14,020	12,409	97.33%	95.85%	88.30%	80.52%	68.29%
Black or African American alone (NH)	52	128	1,043	1,732	2,848	0.31%	0.80%	6.17%	9.95%	15.67%
Native American or Alaska Native alone (NH)	19	32	29	63	32	0.12%	0.20%	0.17%	0.36%	0.18%
Asian alone (NH)	221	342	453	570	569	1.34%	2.13%	2.68%	3.27%	3.13%
Native Hawaiian or Pacific Islander alone (NH)	x	x	14	8	13	x	x	0.08%	0.05%	0.07%
Other race alone (NH)	21	3	12	14	85	0.13%	0.02%	0.07%	0.08%	0.47%
Mixed race or Multiracial (NH)	x	x	152	330	938	x	x	0.90%	1.90%	5.16%
Hispanic or Latino (any race)	127	161	274	674	1,276	0.77%	1.00%	1.62%	3.87%	7.02%
Total	16,509	16,064	16,897	17,411	18,170	100.00%	100.00%	100.00%	100.00%	100.00%

=== 2020 census ===
As of the 2020 census, Colonial Heights had a population of 18,170. The median age was 41.6 years. 21.6% of residents were under the age of 18 and 20.9% of residents were 65 years of age or older. For every 100 females there were 87.2 males, and for every 100 females age 18 and over there were 83.2 males age 18 and over.

100.0% of residents lived in urban areas, while 0.0% lived in rural areas.

There were 7,633 households in Colonial Heights, of which 29.5% had children under the age of 18 living in them. Of all households, 39.4% were married-couple households, 18.6% were households with a male householder and no spouse or partner present, and 35.3% were households with a female householder and no spouse or partner present. About 31.6% of all households were made up of individuals and 15.5% had someone living alone who was 65 years of age or older.

There were 8,147 housing units, of which 6.3% were vacant. The homeowner vacancy rate was 1.9% and the rental vacancy rate was 5.8%.

Racial composition as of the 2020 census
Race	Number	Percent
White	12,652	69.6%
Black or African American	2,915	16.0%
American Indian and Alaska Native	42	0.2%
Asian	579	3.2%
Native Hawaiian and Other Pacific Islander	13	0.1%
Some other race	542	3.0%
Two or more races	1,427	7.9%
Hispanic or Latino (of any race)	1,276	7.0%

=== 2010 census ===
As of the 2010 United States Census, there were 17,411 people living in the city of Colonial Heights. Of those 17,411 people, 76.2% of them were white, 16% were African American, 4.1% were Asian, and 5.9% were Hispanic. The population density of the city was recorded as 2315.3 people per square mile.

=== 2012 educational attainment ===
According to The Comparative Guide to American Suburbs, in 2012 88.3% of people living in Colonial Heights above the age of 25 have a high school diploma of GED.

Out of the adults 25+ living in Colonial Heights that same year, 20.7% have a bachelor's degree or higher and 6.9% have a masters or higher.

=== 2012–2016 American Community Survey ===
There were 7,735 housing units measured during the years 2012-2016 within the city limits. There were 7,206 households residing in those housing units, of which the average family per household during the same years, 2012–2016, was 2.41.

=== 2000 census ===
As of the 2000 census, there were 16,897 people, 7,027 households, and 4,722 families living in the city. The population density was 2,260.3 people per square mile (872.7 people/km^{2}). There were 7,340 housing units at an average density of 981.9 units per square mile (379.1 units/km^{2}). The racial makeup of the city was 80.66% White, 13.81% Black or African American, 0.19% Native American, 3.24% Asian, 0.08% Pacific Islander, 0.64% from other races, and 1.02% from two or more races. 4.67% of the population were Hispanic or Latino of any race.

There were 7,027 households, out of which 29.1% had children under the age of 18 living with them, 50.3% were married couples living together, 13.0% had a female householder with no husband present, and 32.8% were non-families. 27.6% of all households were made up of individuals, and 12.3% had someone living alone who was 65 years of age or older. The average household size was 2.37 and the average family size was 2.88.

In the city, the population was spread out, with 22.6% under the age of 18, 8.3% from 18 to 24, 26.8% from 25 to 44, 23.7% from 45 to 64, and 18.6% who were 65 years of age or older. The median age was 40 years. For every 100 females, there were 87.8 males. For every 100 females aged 18 and over, there were 82.3 males.

The median income for a household in the city was $52,529, and the median income for a family was $66,381. Males had a median income of $39,900 versus $28,875 for females. The per capita income for the city was $28,282. About 7.42% of families and 10.6% of the population were below the poverty line, including 7.3% of those under age 18 and 4.2% of those age 65 or over.

== Major highways ==
- I-95
- US 1
- US 301
- SR 144

In 2017, Colonial Heights added a roundabout off the I-95 exit.

== Economy ==
According to The Comparative Guide to American Suburbs, in 2013, Colonial Heights had an unemployment rate of 8.1%.

== Education ==
=== Elementary and secondary ===
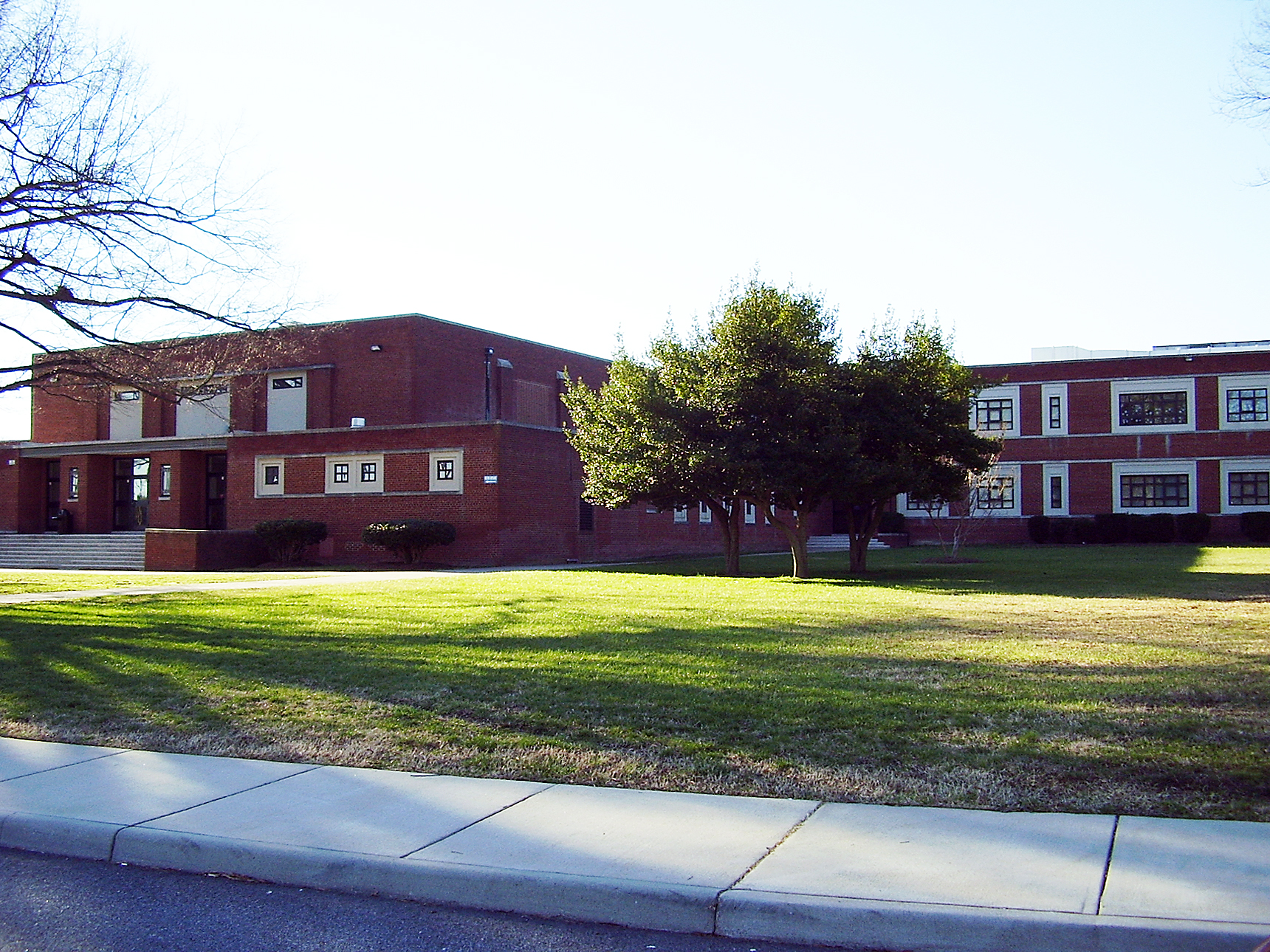
Colonial Heights Middle School

The City of Colonial Heights is served by Colonial Heights Public Schools. There are three elementary schools, Lakeview Elementary School, North Elementary School, Tussing Elementary School; one middle school, Colonial Heights Middle School; and one high school, Colonial Heights High School. All of the schools are accredited by the Virginia Board of Education and by the Southern Association of Colleges and Schools.

=== Higher education ===
The area is served by three schools of higher education:

- A portion of Virginia State University is in Colonial Heights city.
- Richard Bland College (outside of Colonial Heights)
- Brightpoint Community College (outside of Colonial Heights)

== Parks and recreation ==
The city of Colonial Heights has nine parks composed of 75 acres that they must maintain. Those nine parks include White Bank Park, Floral Avenue Park, Edinborough Park, Flora Hill Park, Appamattuck Park, Fort Clifton Park, Lakeview Park, Roslyn Landing Park, and Wakefield Park. In addition to these nine parks, the city also maintains many other recreational facilities such as ballfields (including Shephard Stadium), a soccer complex, and tennis courts.

White Bank park is located at 400 White Bank Rd, Colonial Heights, VA 23834. The park runs adjacent to Swift Creek and stretches over 22 acres. The park has two pavilions that citizens rent out for events.

Floral Avenue Park consists of .3 acres. The park is home to basketball courts and playgrounds.

Edinborough Park is located at 800 Edinborough Dr, Colonial Heights, VA 23834. In this park, one can find basketball courts, picnic tables, and playground equipment.

Flora Hill Park is located at 300 Richmond Ave, Colonial Heights, VA 23834. This park is mainly just open grassy areas, trails, and playground equipment.

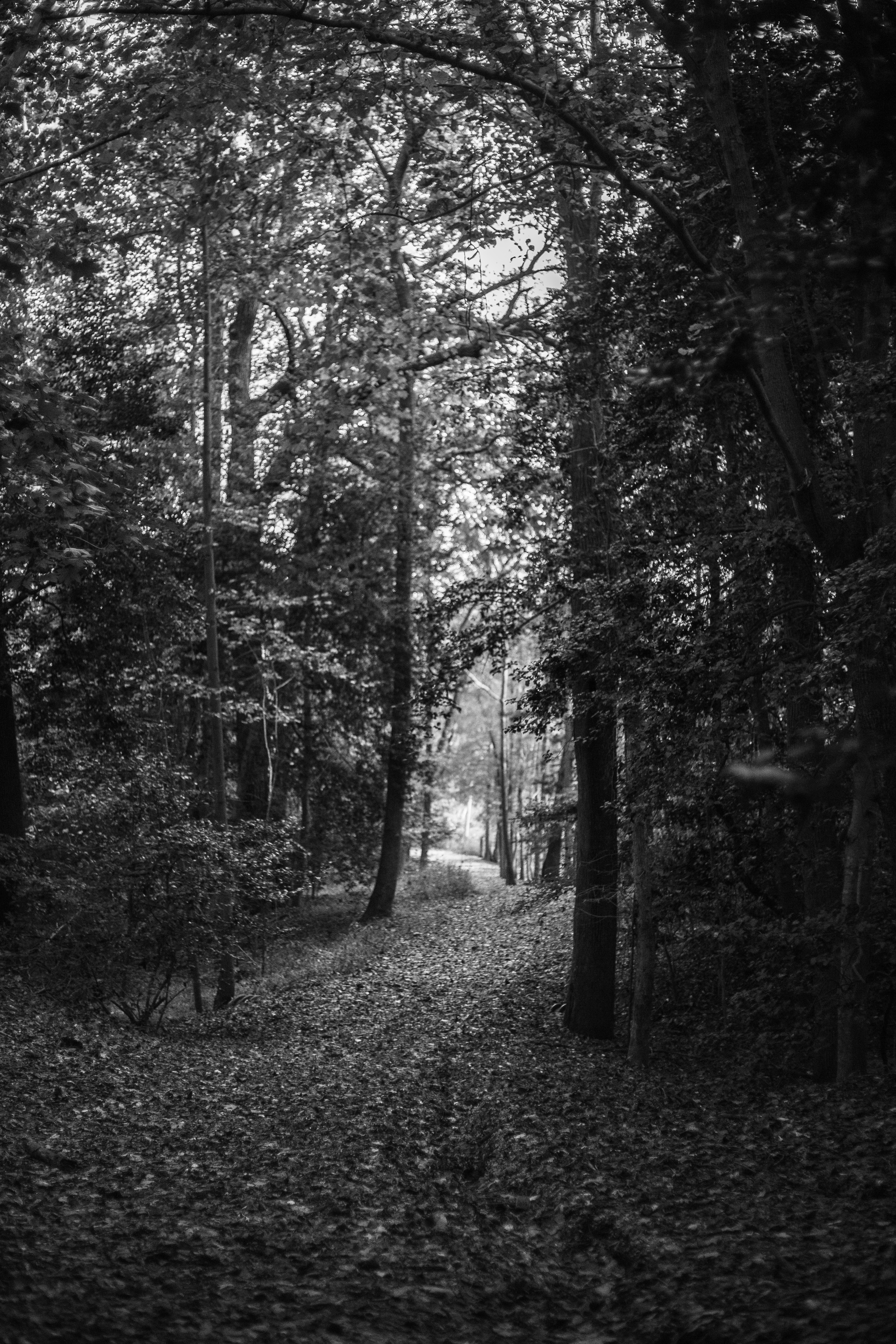

Appamattuck Park is located at 151 Archer Ave, Colonial Heights, VA 23834. This park consists of land surrounding the Appomattox River and falls along the Petersburg border of Colonial Heights.

Fort Clifton Park is located at 100 Brockwell Ln, Colonial Heights, VA 23834. Fort Clifton also runs along the Appomattox River and consists of 24 acres. This park is historical and according to the Colonial Heights City website noted as where five Union ships sailed Confederate Troops on June 11, 1864. This may be Colonial Heights's most abundant park, filled with amenities such as an amphitheater, ballfields, basketball courts, drinking fountain, fishing pier, pavilions, picnic shelters, playgrounds, restrooms, and trails. The local public schools use Fort Clifton for sporting events and recesses. The playgrounds found in Fort Clifton Park are technically belonging to Tussing Elementary.

Lakeview Park is located at 503 Lake Ave, Colonial Heights, VA 23834. In addition to the playgrounds, trails, and picnic tables, Lakeview Park is home to a boating ramp where community members can go fishing during daylight.

Roslyn Landing Park is located at Appomattox River Trail, Colonial Heights, VA 23834. This park is mainly just trails for walking or biking.

== Climate ==
The climate in and around the city of Colonial Heights is described as a humid subtropical climate where the summers are very hot and humid while the winters are moderately cold. The coldest weather is seen from December to February, January's daily average temperature is 37.9 degrees Fahrenheit. The hottest weather is seen from June through August, July's daily average temperature is 79.3 degrees Fahrenheit. The total annual precipitation normal for the city is approximately 43.6 inches. The month with the highest normal precipitation is August with 4.66 inches on average while February is the month with the least amount of precipitation on average with 2.76 inches.

== Economy ==
=== Top employers ===
According to the City of Colonial Height's 2022 Annual Comprehensive Financial Report, the top employers in the city are:

#	Employer	# of Employees
1	Walmart	500-999
2	Colonial Heights Public Schools	500-999
3	City of Colonial Heights	250-499
4	Care Advantage	100-249
5	Publix Nc Employee Services, LLC	100-249
6	Colonial Heights Rehab & Nursing	100-249
7	The Home Depot	100-249
8	Red Lobster & Olive Garden	50-99
9	Chick-fil-A at Southpark	50-99
10	Texas Roadhouse	50-99

== Media ==
Colonial Heights has one weekly periodical, a free publication:

- Colonial Heights Patriot, published by the Hopewell Publishing Company.

It is also served by a daily newspaper of record for the area:

- The Progress-Index, published by Gatehouse Media.

== Notable people ==
- Gray Gaulding – NASCAR driver
- The Unipiper – Brian Kidd, Internet celebrity
- Kirk Cox – former Speaker of the Virginia House of Delegates
- Olavo de Carvalho – Brazilian astrologer and conspiracy theorist

== Politics ==
Unlike most independent cities in the state of Virginia, Colonial Heights has consistently voted Republican in presidential elections since its date of incorporation. All GOP presidential candidates since 1952 have carried the city, with the 13 most recent campaigns each garnering over 60% of the vote. In 1972, and again in 1980, Colonial Heights gave the GOP nominee the largest percentage of the vote of any county or incorporated city in Virginia.

Colonial Heights has seven council members; Mayor Gregory T. Kochuba, Vice-Mayor E. "Betsy" Gentry Luck, Councilman Michael A. Cherry, Councilman John E. Piotrowski, Councilwoman Dr. Laura F. Poe, Councilman R.W. "Bobby" Wade, and Councilman John T. Wood.

Colonial Heights has a city manager named Douglas E. Smith and a city lawyer named Hugh "Chip" P. Fisher, III.

United States presidential election results for Colonial Heights, Virginia
Year	Republican		Democratic		Third party(ies)	
Year	No.	%	No.	%	No.	%
1952	896	51.73%	835	48.21%	1	0.06%
1956	1,037	47.74%	956	44.01%	179	8.24%
1960	1,372	53.16%	1,198	46.42%	11	0.43%
1964	2,420	66.85%	1,198	33.09%	2	0.06%
1968	2,650	48.96%	650	12.01%	2,113	39.04%
1972	5,304	87.99%	541	8.97%	183	3.04%
1976	4,291	61.88%	2,409	34.74%	234	3.37%
1980	5,012	70.96%	1,692	23.96%	359	5.08%
1984	6,387	83.71%	1,218	15.96%	25	0.33%
1988	6,001	78.57%	1,581	20.70%	56	0.73%
1992	5,298	63.07%	1,721	20.49%	1,381	16.44%
1996	4,632	66.62%	1,782	25.63%	539	7.75%
2000	5,519	70.92%	2,100	26.99%	163	2.09%
2004	6,129	74.46%	2,061	25.04%	41	0.50%
2008	6,161	69.62%	2,562	28.95%	126	1.42%
2012	5,941	68.89%	2,544	29.50%	139	1.61%
2016	5,681	67.18%	2,367	27.99%	409	4.84%
2020	6,007	65.68%	2,972	32.50%	167	1.83%
2024	5,883	65.63%	2,982	33.27%	99	1.10%

== See also ==
- National Register of Historic Places listings in Colonial Heights, Virginia
- Tri-Cities, Virginia
- Virginia
