= History of Petersburg, Virginia =

The history of Petersburg, Virginia, United States as a modern settlement begins in the 17th century when it was first settled. The city was incorporated in 1748. It was occupied by the British during the American Revolutionary War, and Major-General William Phillips died of fever at Blandford (later a neighborhood of Petersburg) during bombardment from the Marquis de Lafayette's positions north of the river. After the war, it became a destination for many free blacks in Virginia, as well as a growing hub for railroads. By 1860, it was the second largest city in Virginia. For nine months in 1864 and 1865 it was the subject of the Siege of Petersburg; the fall of the city unleashed a chain of events over the following two weeks that resulted in the end of the American Civil War. After the war, it again flourished as a destination for Freedmen. Petersburg was a notable focal point in the organization of the Civil Rights Movement in the mid-20th century. In the late 20th century, the city suffered significant economic decline.

== Indigenous people ==
In 2006 archaeological excavations at Pocahontas Island found evidence of prehistoric Native American settlement dated to 6500 B.C. This is in the early third of the Archaic Period (8000 to 1000 BC). Varying cultures of indigenous peoples lived in the area for thousands of years.

When the English arrived in Virginia in 1607, the region was occupied by the Appamatuck, a significant tribe of the Powhatan Confederacy. They were governed by a weroance, King Coquonosum, and by his sister, Queen Opossunoquonuske. This Algonquian-speaking people later had a town at Rohoic Creek (formerly Rohowick or Indian Towne Run), on the western edge of present-day Petersburg.

== Colonial period ==
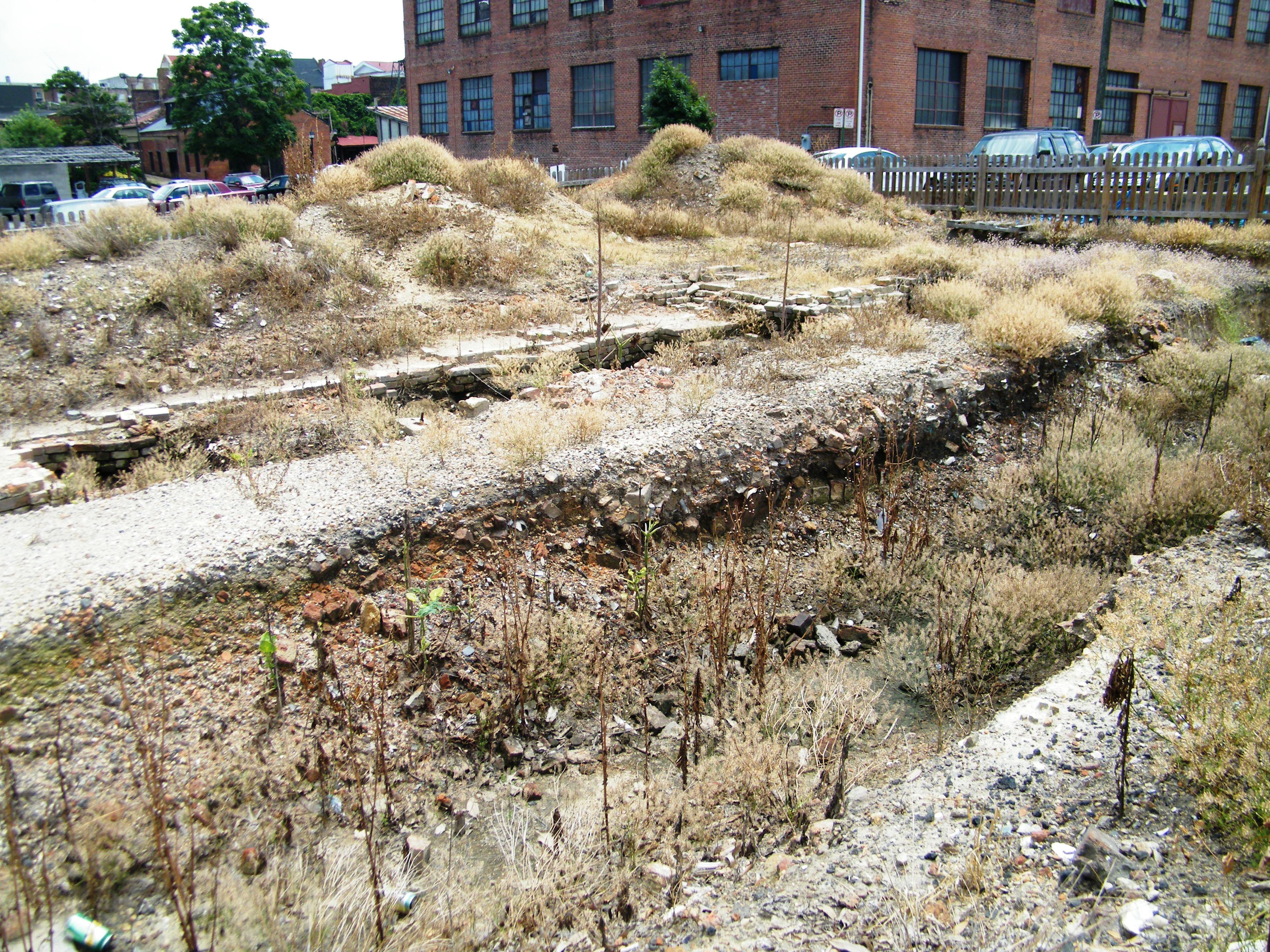
Archaeological excavation at the site of the 18th-century Golden Ball Tavern

Petersburg was founded and settled by English colonists. By 1635 they had patented land along the south bank of the Appomattox River as far west as present-day Sycamore Street, and about 1 mile (1.6 km) inland. In 1646, the Virginia Colony established Fort Henry a short distance from the Appamatuck town, near the falls. Col. Abraham Wood sent several famous expeditions out from here in the following years to explore points to the west, as far as the Appalachian Mountains.

Some time around 1675, Wood's son-in-law, Peter Jones, who then commanded the fort and traded with the Indians, opened a trading post nearby, known as Peter's Point. The Bolling family, prominent tobacco planters and traders, also lived in the area from the early 18th century. In 1733, Col. William Byrd II (who founded Richmond at the same time) conceived plans for a city at Peter's Point, to be renamed Petersburgh. The Virginia General Assembly formally incorporated both Petersburg and adjacent Blandford on December 17, 1748. Wittontown, north of the river, was settled in 1749, and became incorporated as Pocahontas in 1752. Petersburg was enlarged slightly in 1762, adding 28 acres (110,000 m^{2}) to "Old Town".

During the American Revolutionary War, the British drive to regain control erupted in the Battle of Blanford in 1781, which started just east of Petersburg. As the Americans retreated north across the Appomattox River, they took up the planks of the Pocahontas bridge to delay the enemy. Although the British drove the Americans from Blanford and Petersburg, they did not regain a strategic advantage in the war. Cornwallis' forces surrendered at Yorktown soon after this battle.

== Antebellum period ==
After the Revolutionary War, in 1784 Petersburg annexed the adjacent towns of Blandford (also called Blanford) and Pocahontas and the suburb of Ravenscroft, which became neighborhoods of the city. In 1790 its population totaled 2,828, making it one of the largest settlements in the country. An area known as Gillfield was annexed in 1798.

In the first two decades after the war, inspired by the Revolution's principles of equality, numerous Virginia slaveholders manumitted their slaves. Some of those freed were the mixed-race "natural children" of white planters, born to enslaved mothers outside of legal marriage. The number of free blacks in Virginia rose markedly between 1782 and 1810. Because of the availability of jobs in Petersburg, many free people of color in Virginia migrated to the growing urban community. They established First Baptist (1774) and Gillfield Baptist Church (1797), the first and second oldest black congregations in the city and two of the oldest in the nation. The black churches were the first Baptist churches established in Petersburg.

For years the center of the free black residential area was Pocahontas Island, a peninsula on the north shore of the Appomattox River. With access to waterways and a sympathetic population, this neighborhood was an important site on the Underground Railroad. One surviving house in the Pocahontas Island Historic District is associated with it.

The Pocahontas Island Historic District was listed on the National Register of Historic Places on November 3, 2006. The Pocahontas Island Black History Museum, established in 2003 by Richard Stewart, is located on Pocahontas Island. It was once a stop on the Underground Railroad, and features artifacts and other historical items from over 200 years of black history.

The Port of Petersburg became renowned as a commercial center for processing cotton, tobacco and metal, then shipping products out of the region. The city became an important industrial center in a mostly agricultural state with few major cities.

Residents' devotion to the cause during the War of 1812 led to the formation of the Petersburg Volunteers—who distinguished themselves in action at the Siege of Fort Meigs on May 5, 1813. President James Madison called Petersburg "Cockade of the Union" (or "Cockade City"), in honor of the cockades which Volunteers wore on their caps.

In 1815, a fire destroyed much of the business district.

Flourishing businesses helped the city make improvements. Starting in 1813, the city paved its streets. A development company created a canal to bypass the Appomattox Falls. Next came railroad lines to link the city to all points of the compass. As travel technology developed in the mid-19th century, Petersburg became established as a railroad center, with lines completed to Richmond to the north, Farmville and Lynchburg to the west, and Weldon, North Carolina to the south. The last major line was completed in 1858 to the east, with the Norfolk and Petersburg Railroad connecting to an ocean port.

In 1851 the city introduced gas lighting and by 1857 installed a new municipal water system. All these civic improvements helped attract and hold a substantial business community, based on manufacture of tobacco products, but also including cotton and flour mills, and banking.

== Civil War ==
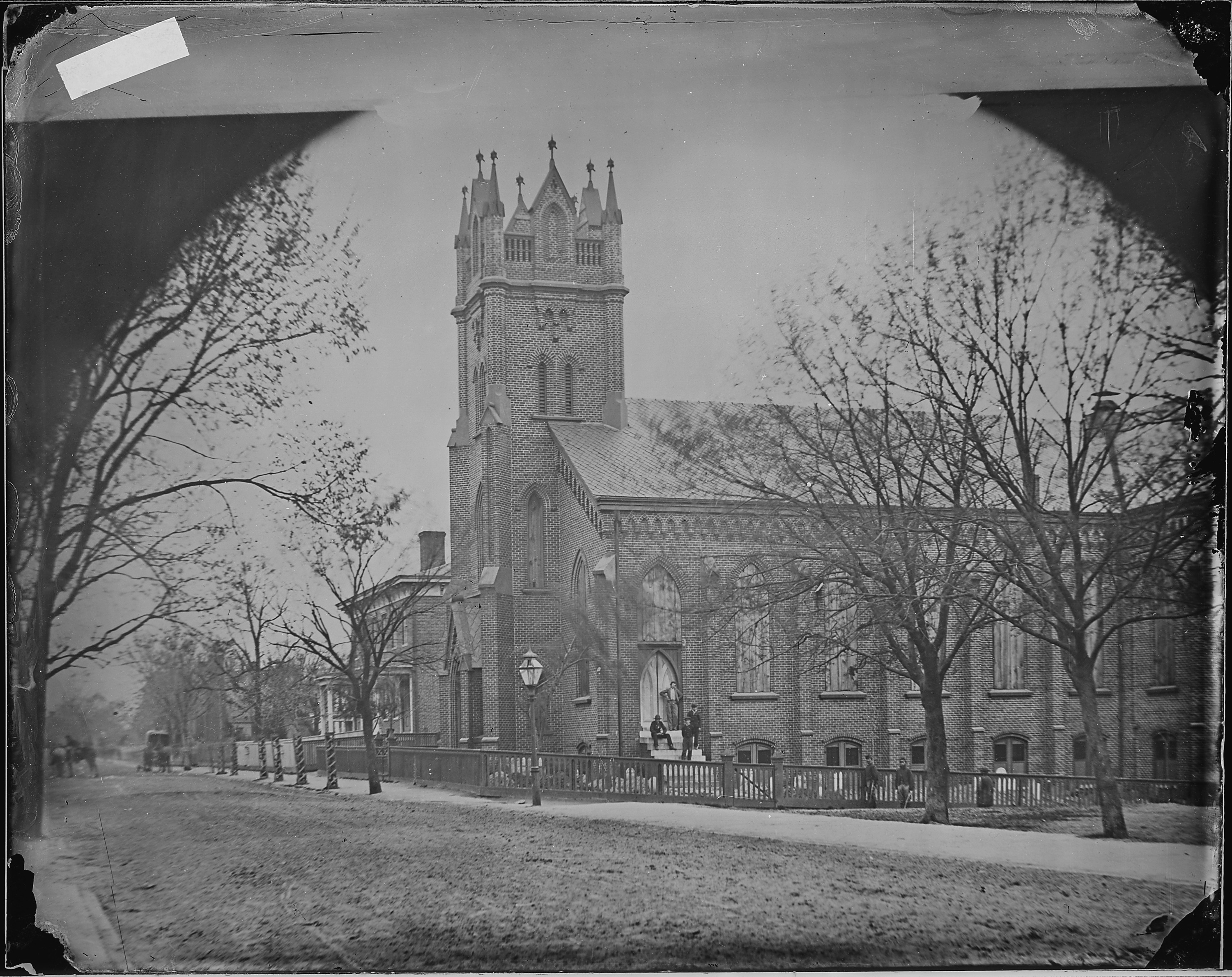
Christ Church in Petersburg, 1865

At the time of the American Civil War, Petersburg was the second largest city in Virginia, and the seventh-largest city in the Confederacy. Its 1860 population was 18,266, half of whom were black. Free blacks numbered 3,224 (one-third) and had been attracted to the city for the opportunities in industries and trades. Petersburg's population had the highest percentage of free African Americans of any city in the Confederacy and the largest number of free blacks in the Mid-Atlantic. Many had settled on Pocahontas Island. Because of its significant past and prehistoric archaeological evidence, the Pocahontas Island Historic District is listed on the National Register of Historic Places. Ninety percent of the population are native Virginians, as most of their ancestors had been in the state since the 17th and 18th centuries.

When the Civil War began in 1861, Petersburg was strategic. The city provided several infantry companies and artillery units to the Confederate Army, along three troops of cavalry. In April 1861 more than 300 free Petersburg African Americans volunteered to work on the fortifications of Norfolk, Virginia under their own leader. Slaveholders also contributed the labor of numerous black slaves.

In 1864, Petersburg became a target during the Overland Campaign of Union General Ulysses S. Grant. The numerous railroads made Petersburg a lifeline for Richmond, the Confederate capital. The depot at Pocahontas Island, built for the Richmond & Petersburg rail line, was a transit point for Confederate troops and supplies.

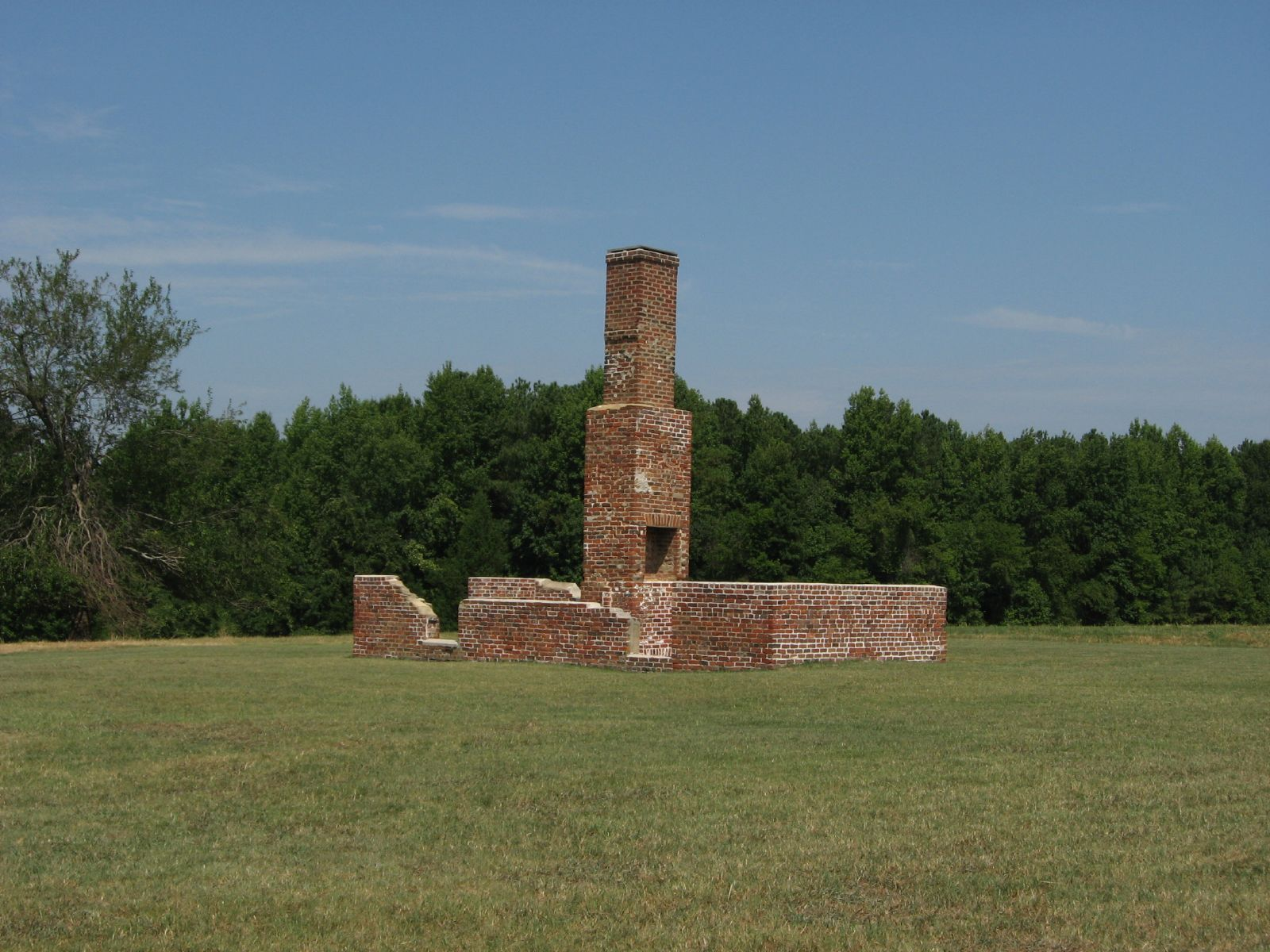
Ruins of pre-war slave quarters on the Petersburg Battlefield

Petersburg was the headquarters of the Confederate Army's Second Regiment of Engineers, whose members included Benjamin Morgan Harrod, a Harvard-trained civil engineer who later designed the water and sewer systems of his native New Orleans, Louisiana.

After his defeat at the Battle of Cold Harbor, Grant remained east of Richmond and moved south to Petersburg. Grant intended to cut the rail lines into Petersburg, stopping Richmond's supplies. On June 9, troops led by William F. "Baldy" Smith of the 18th Corps, attacked the Dimmock Line, a series of defensive breastworks constructed in 1861 and 1862 to protect Petersburg against the Army of the Potomac under General George McClellan during the Peninsula Campaign. The Confederate troops numbered only 2,000, but Smith and Winfield S. Hancock were hesitant to attack the fortified line. Confederate General P.G.T. Beauregard informed Lee that he was facing virtually the entire the Army of the Potomac with his few defenders at Petersburg. Lee arrived with the fabled Army of Northern Virginia, and the 292-day Siege of Petersburg began. Lee himself admitted that the South could not win a siege war.

The trench lines on the east of Petersburg were close together. A soldier in the 48th Pennsylvania Infantry of the Union Army IX Corp, a coal miner in civilian life, remarked, "We could blow that battery into oblivion if we could dig a mine underneath it." Colonel Henry Pleasants, his division commander, liked the idea and forwarded it up the chain of command. Grant gave his approval. On July 30, the explosives in the tunnel were detonated. Due to botched Union leadership and arrival of Confederate General William Mahone, the Union forces suffered a disastrous defeat at the Battle of the Crater, suffering over 4,000 casualties. The battle was portrayed in the film Cold Mountain (2003). By the end of the war, the city was ringed with a series of fortifications.

In early April 1865, Union troops finally managed to push their left flank to the railroad to Weldon, North Carolina and the Southside Railroad. With the loss of Petersburg's crucial lifelines, the Confederate forces had to retreat, ending the siege in a victory for the Union Army.

The fall of Petersburg meant that Richmond could no longer be defended, Lee attempted to lead his men south to join up with Confederate forces in North Carolina. Hopelessly outnumbered, he was surrounded and forced to surrender at Appomattox Court House, Virginia, on April 9, 1865. Confederate General Ambrose P. (A.P.) Hill died on the last day the Confederates held the Petersburg trenches. Petersburg established a warfare precedent. During World War I the armies on both sides used trenches extensively in Europe (q.v. trench warfare).

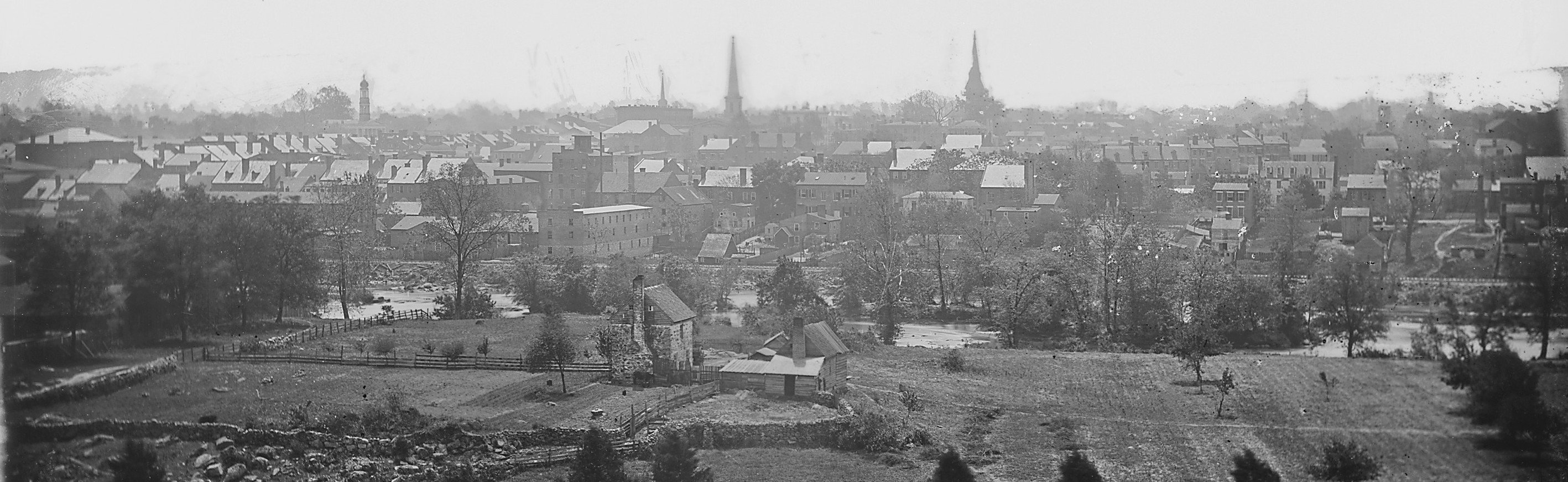
Skyline of Petersburg at the end of the American Civil War in 1865

== Reconstruction era ==
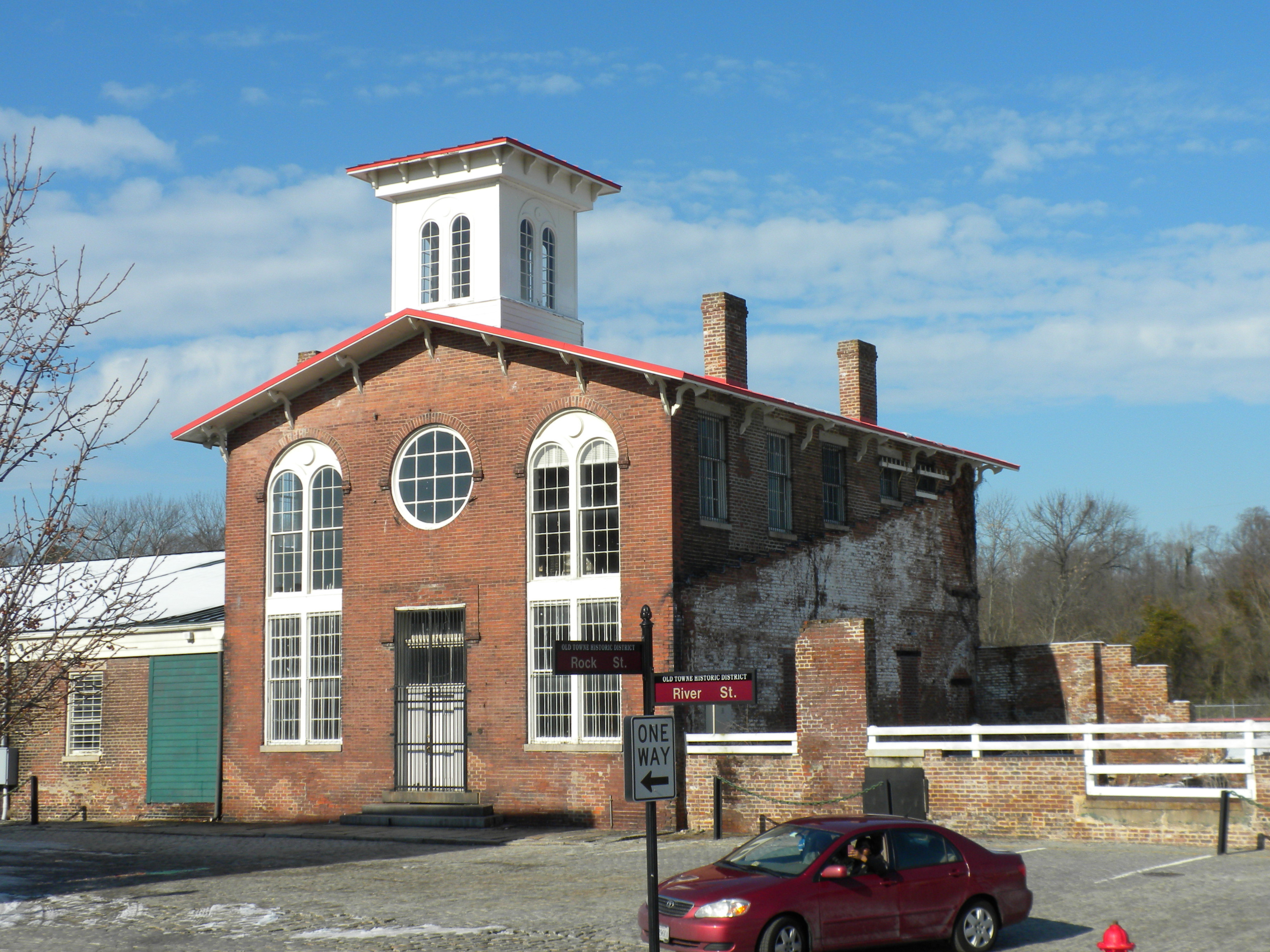
South Side Railroad Depot on Rock Street which served as the office of William Mahone when his Readjustor Party dominated Virginia politics

The Freedmen's Bureau established new facilities for freedmen, including a mental health hospital in December 1869, at Howard's Grove Hospital, a former Confederate unit. In 1870 the General Assembly incorporated the Central Lunatic Asylum as an organized state institution, as part of an effort by the Reconstruction-era legislature to increase public institutions for general welfare. The legislature also founded the state's first system of free public education.

In the years after the Civil War, many freedmen migrated to Petersburg for rebuilding, work on the river, and to escape the white control prevalent in more rural areas. They found numerous churches, businesses and institutions founded by free blacks, and added new energy to the community. In 1874 James M. Wilkerson Sr. founded the Wilkerson Undertaking Company. It continues to operate as the James M. Wilkerson Funeral Establishment, Inc. and is one of the oldest black-owned firms in the United States. Although in the 1870s, conservative whites took power in the state and began to legislate racial segregation, African Americans continued to create their own businesses and community organizations in Petersburg.

During the 1880s, a coalition of black Republicans and white Populists held power for several years in the state legislature. This resulted in two major public institutions in Petersburg, as the legislature invested in education and welfare. In 1882, the legislature founded Virginia State University in nearby Ettrick as Virginia Normal and Collegiate Institute. It was one of the first public (fully state-supported) four-year historically black colleges and universities (HBCU) in the Mid-Atlantic. This was part of a drive to improve public education that started with the Reconstruction legislature. John Mercer Langston, a national political leader and former dean of Howard University's law department, was selected as the college's first president. An Oberlin College graduate, he was an accomplished attorney who had been a leader of abolitionists in Ohio and held national appointments. In 1888, Langston was elected to the US Congress on the Republican ticket, the first African American to be elected to Congress from Virginia. He was also the last for nearly a century.

Also in 1882, the state legislature authorized moving the asylum facility to the Mayfield Farm and developing a new campus there. This is the site of the present-day Central State Hospital, which provides a variety of mental health services.

== 20th century ==
The limitations of Petersburg's small geographic area and proximity to Richmond were structural problems that hampered it in adapting to major economic changes in the 20th century. Other forces in the mid-20th century acted to pull people and jobs from the city. It suffered from competition with nearby Richmond, which grew to dominate the region in a changing economy as industries restructured.

World wars led to major federal institutions being constructed at Petersburg, which created local jobs. Soon after World War I started, the US Army established Camp Lee for training draftees. The facility was used again during World War II. In 1950 the camp was designated Fort Lee, and additional buildings were constructed to house the U.S. Army Quartermaster Corps Center and School.

In the late 19th and early 20th century, Virginia's Democratic Party–dominated legislature instituted Jim Crow laws, including imposing racial segregation. It also approved constitutional changes that effectively disfranchised most blacks and many poor whites. Those disfranchised suffered major losses in the ability to exercise their rights as citizens. For instance, without being able to vote, they could not serve on juries or be appointed to certain offices. The white legislature consistently underfunded services and schools for blacks.

With many African Americans having served the nation and cause of freedom in WWII, in the postwar years they pressed for social justice, an end to segregation, and restoration of voting power. Even after the Great Migration of blacks to northern jobs and cities, Petersburg was 40 percent black in 1960. Those citizens were barred from free use of public spaces and facilities. Major black churches, such as First Baptist and Gillfield Baptist, formed the moral center of the Civil Rights Movement in Petersburg, which gained strength in mid-century and was a major center of action.

Dr. Wyatt Tee Walker, the pastor of Gillfield Baptist Church, had become friends with Dr. Martin Luther King Jr. in the early 1950s when they were both in divinity school. In 1957 they co-founded the Southern Christian Leadership Conference (SCLC), an important force for leadership of the movement in the South. Walker also founded the Petersburg Improvement Association (PIA), modeled on the Montgomery Improvement Association in Alabama. According to Walker and other close associates of King, Petersburg had played an important role, a kind of blueprint for the national civil rights struggle. King spent time in the city on several occasions in the 1950s and 60s, and several of his top lieutenants were recruited from the local movement.

African Americans in Petersburg struggled, with federal government support, to desegregate public schools and facilities. Through sit-ins in the bus terminal in 1960, the PIA gained agreement by the president of the Bus Terminal Restaurants to desegregate lunch counters in Petersburg and several other cities. Virginia officials at the top levels resisted school integration and initiated the program of Massive Resistance. For instance, rather than integrate, the school board of neighboring Prince Edward County closed public schools for five years, starting in 1959.

In the 1950s, Petersburg became the southern terminus of the Richmond-Petersburg Turnpike, predating the U.S. Interstate Highway System.

In 1958 Petersburg was named an "All American City" for its quality of life. In 1970, Carrie E. Miles, from Ward One-Blandford, became the first African-American Women to hold a seat on the Petersburg Public Schools Board of Education since Reconstruction. Retail and industry prospered there until about the early 1980s. De-industrialization and structural economic changes cost many jobs in the city, as happened in numerous older industrial cities across the North and Midwest. The postwar national movement of highway construction and suburbanization added to problems. Many middle-class families moved to newer housing in the suburbs and to nearby Richmond, where the economy was expanding with jobs in fields of financial and retail services. Some companies moved industrial jobs to states further south, where wages were lower, or out of the country altogether. Without sufficient jobs and decreasing middle-class population, city progress slowed.

The declining economy increased the pressure of competition and racial tensions. These flared from 1968 to 1980. Following the assassination of King in 1968, Petersburg was the first city to designate his birthday as a holiday, an observance that is now a national holiday. Regional tensions were heightened by the city's two large annexations of adjacent portions of Dinwiddie and Prince George Counties in the early 1970s. Despite the large addition of suburban school-age children, a downward trend in public school enrollment continued. Projected industrial development of large tracts of vacant land in the annexed areas did not materialize. In 1985 city leaders were unable to keep Brown & Williamson tobacco company, a top employer, from relocating to Macon, Georgia. The company, disappointed in the city council's vote to raise taxes on tools and machinery, relocated to a market with lower taxes.

Partially due to the vacant land still available for potential industrial development, which had been used as justification for the earlier annexations, in 1986 the city failed in its attempt to annex a large section of neighboring Prince George County. It had hoped to enlarge its area for schools and tax base.

When negotiations soured in 1989 to build a new regional mall in Petersburg, the city suffered an economic setback. Numerous remaining retail merchants relocated to the new Southpark Mall area in adjacent Colonial Heights. In a typical postwar US pattern, suburban development through the late 20th century drew off retail from the former downtown area. It was once vibrant near the north end of Sycamore Street but had declined by the late 20th century because of structural changes in industries, and loss of local jobs and customers.

== 21st century ==
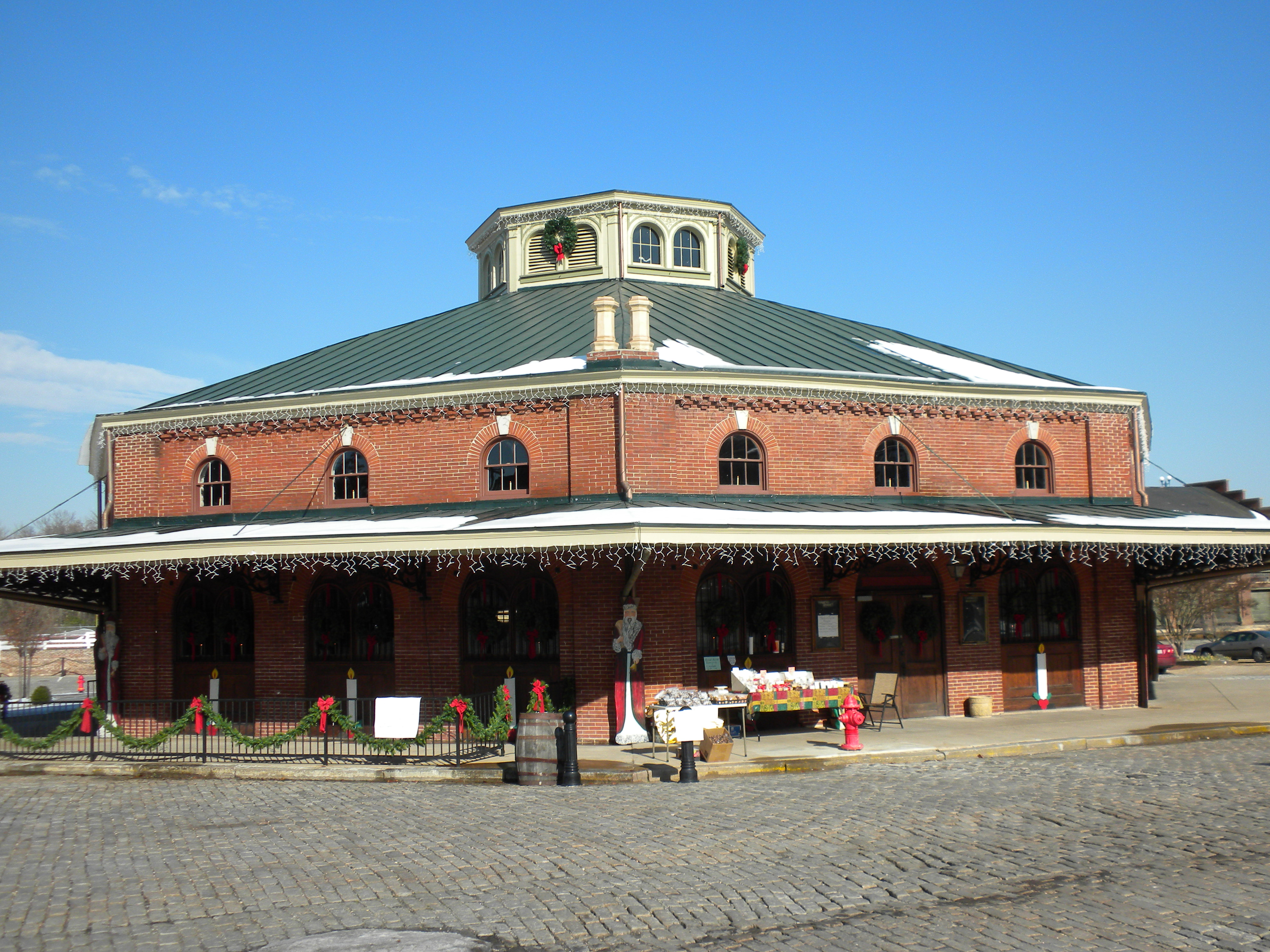
The city market has been preserved and is still used as a market.

In the early 21st century, Petersburg leaders are highlighting its attractive historical and industrial sites, with associated access to an exceptionally wide transportation network. As of 2007, Petersburg continued to evolve as a small city, even as the nature of its commercial activities changed. Downtown Petersburg, known as Old Towne, began experiencing a rebirth. The Army has substantially expanded activities at nearby Fort Lee, home of the United States Army's Sustainment Center of Excellence, as well as the Army's Logistics Branch, Ordnance, Quartermaster, and Transportation Corps.

== See also ==
- List of mayors of Petersburg, Virginia
