= David G. Carr =

American politician

David Green Carr

Member of the Virginia Senate from the Dinwiddie, Sussex, Greensville district
- In office October 5, 1869 – December 5, 1871
- Preceded by: George W. Bolling
- Succeeded by: William N. Stevens

Personal details
- Born: May 24, 1809 Laurens, Otsego County, New York
- Died: April 7, 1883 (aged 73) Petersburg, Virginia
- Party: Republican
- Spouse(s): Hannah Burnside; M. Susan Walker
- Children: 3 sons, 3 daughters
- Profession: farmer, politician

David Green Carr (May 24, 1809 – April 7, 1889), who settled in Dinwiddie County, Virginia and farmed before the American Civil War, after the war's end became active in the Republican Party and served in the Virginia Constitutional Convention of 1868, in the Virginia Senate and as customs collector in Petersburg.

== Early and family life ==
Born in 1809 in rural Laurens, Otsego County, New York to Mary Greene Carr (1789-1845) and her husband George Carr (1786-1858), he was descended on his father's side from colonial Rhode Island governor Caleb Carr. David G. Carr married Hannah Burnside (1811-1855) by 1833, and they had 3 sons and 3 daughters before the family moved to Dinwiddie County, Virginia, where Carr had purchased 380 acres near San Marino. However, his wife died of cancer on February 10, 1855. After her death Carr returned to New York, where he married widow Susan M Walker (1820-1882), who also moved to Dinwiddie County with him, and with whom he had a daughter, Hannah (b. 1859). Son Charles H. Carr (1833-1862) and daughter Eveline Carr (b. 1837) (who both appeared on the 1850 census with their mother) do not appear on the 1860 Virginia census, although son Henry C. Carr (1839-1873) and daughter Mariett (b. 1846) appear on both censuses.

Charles H. Carr did move to Virginia with his parents, but he and his wife (whom he married in 1856) lived nearby in Petersburg, and they had a daughter and son before Charles was conscripted into the 41st Virginia Infantry in March 1862. By May private Carr was hospitalized at Camp Winder hospital in Richmond because of dysentery, and he committed suicide with a revolver the following month while ill with typhoid fever.

== Career ==
David Carr became active in the Republican party after the American Civil War, perhaps embittered by his elder son's conscription and death, or his daughter-in-law's move with the young grandchildren back to New York. Petersburg and Dinwiddie County had become battlefields, especially late in the war, and Carr later filed documents for tools, grain and hogs (among other items) destroyed or taken by Union troops from his farm.

In the first postwar election, in which emancipated blacks were a majority of the county's voters, David Carr and William Reed were elected to represent Dinwiddie and neighboring Prince George county at the Virginia Constitutional Convention of 1868. Carr had overwhelming support from African American voters, and chaired the Committee on Pardoning Powers and Committee on Currency, Banking and Insurance Companies, but seldom spoke during the public sessions. In January 1868 he introduced a resolution proposing to close the Virginia Military Institute and distribute the proceeds to fund public schools. Delegate Carr also supported proposals disenfranchising Confederate officers and officials (which voters failed to approve) the following year. Occupying military authorities appointed Carr an election registrar in 1869. Voters in Dinwiddie and neighboring Greensville and Sussex counties easily elected Carr to the Virginia Senate in 1869 (the first election after adopting the new state constitution). The Petersburg Index grouped Carr with carpetbaggers, notwithstanding his nearly two decades of residence in the county, perhaps in part because he succeeded George W. Bolling (1806-1875), of the long locally prominent Bolling family, who had received a prompt pardon from President Andrew Johnson despite his namesake son's Confederate military service and had won the seat in 1865. In 1869 Carr was nominated as the customs collector in Petersburg, and Congress confirmed his appointment on April 21, 1870. Carr then gave his farm to his son Henry (who had married in 1867) and moved to Petersburg, but Henry Carr died in 1873. In the 1871 election, the Senatorial district's voters replaced Carr with William N. Stevens, a free-born black lawyer and Republican politician who would represent Sussex County and adjoining areas for much of two decades. President Rutherford B. Hayes returned David Carr to his customs post in 1877, and he held the position until shortly before his death.

== Death and legacy ==
David Carr, a Mason, died of chronic gastric problems on April 7, 1883, less than a year after his second wife. He was buried beside her and one of his daughters in historic Blandford Cemetery. The Petersburg Daily Index-Appeal gave him a fond obituary.
