= Florence S. Farley =

American politician (1928–2022)

104th Mayor of Petersburg
- In office 1984–1990
- Preceded by: Wilson Cheely
- Succeeded by: Charles H. Cuthbert IV

Personal details
- Born: Florence Saunders; May 28, 1928 Roanoke, Virginia, U.S.
- Died: August 28, 2022 (aged 94) Petersburg, Virginia, U.S.
- Resting place: Blandford Cemetery, Petersburg, Virginia, U.S.
- Party: Democratic
- Spouse: Richard Farley (m. 1955; died 1970)
- Education: Virginia State College (BS, MS); Kent State University (PhD)
- Occupation: Psychologist; educator; politician; artist

Military service
- Branch/service: United States Army
- Unit: Women's Army Corps

Florence Saunders Farley (née Saunders; May 28, 1928 – August 28, 2022) was an American politician who served as the first Black female mayor of Petersburg, Virginia. She had also spent many years for Peterburg's school board.

== Early life and education ==
Florence Saunders Farley was born on May 28, 1928, in Roanoke, Virginia to parents Neoda Florence Saunders and Stacious Thadeous Saunders, where she was the ninth out of the 10 children in her family. She attended Harrison Elementary School when she was a child.

In 1946, Farley graduated as a salutatorian of her class from Lucy Addison High School. Then, she attended Virginia State College (now Virginia State University), graduating with a B.S. degree in psychology in 1950 and an M.S. degree in educational psychology in 1954. In 1955, she married Richard Farley.

She also got a Ph.D. degree in psychology from the Kent State University in Kent, Ohio in 1977, and was the chair of the psychology department.

Farley went and signed up to the Women's Army Corps at Fort Lee in 1951 and became the first black women to become a training officer along with being commissioned to second lieutenant.

Farley first served as Chief Psychologist at Central State Hospital, and was the first African American clinically licensed psychologist in Virginia.

== Political career ==
Farley first began her career in 1973 when she became the first woman to be elected into the Petersburg City Council, where she also became a member of Virginia's first major black city council. She then won re-election in 1978 and 1982. In 1984, she was elected as mayor of Petersburg after the resignation of Wilson Cheely. She became the first female and African-American mayor.

From 2003 to 2006, Farley became very active within the Petersburg school board, serving as the vice chair. In 2010, she was recognized by The Library of Virginia as an “African American Trailblazer in Virginia History.”

== Personal life ==
Farley passed away on August 28, 2022, at age 94.
