= William N. Stevens =

American politician (1850–1889)

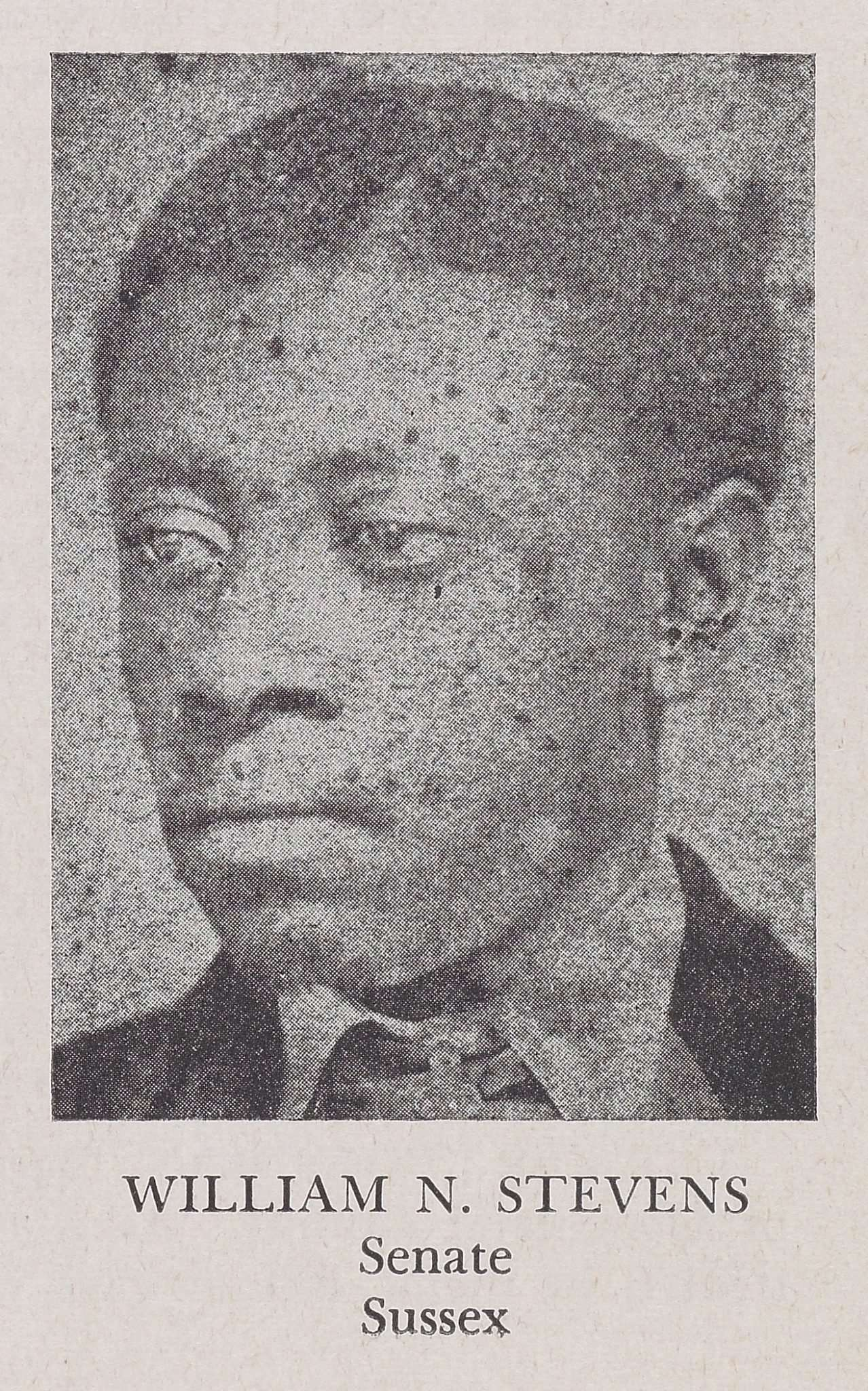
- Stevens, at the start of his term in the Virginia Senate, c. 1871

Member of the Virginia Senate from the Sussex and adjoining counties district
- In office December 7, 1881 – December 4, 1883
- Preceded by: Samuel Pickett
- Succeeded by: George P. Barham

Member of the Virginia Senate from the Sussex and adjoining counties district
- In office December 6, 1871 – December 2, 1879
- Preceded by: David G. Carr
- Succeeded by: Samuel Pickett

Member of the Virginia House of Delegates from the Sussex County district
- In office October 5, 1869 – December 5, 1871
- Preceded by: T. H. Daniel
- Succeeded by: J. H. Van Auken

Personal details
- Born: 1850 Petersburg, Virginia, U.S.
- Died: 1889 (aged 38–39)
- Party: Republican
- Profession: lawyer, politician

William Nash Stevens (1850–1889) was an American lawyer and politician who represented Sussex County, Virginia in both houses of the Virginia General Assembly. He is believed to have been the first African-American to represent the country in the Virginia House of Delegates and the Virginia State Senate.

== Early and family life ==
Stevens was born free to Mary A. Stevens and her contractor husband, Christopher B. Stevens, in Petersburg, Virginia.The family had been free three or four generations. They owned their own home as well as additional lot purchased in 1850 and 1858. Stevens pursued legal studies and became a lawyer. He never married.

== Career ==
Stevens was admitted to the Virginia state bar and moved to Sussex County, which he represented in both house of the Virginia General Assembly during much of the next two decades. He also purchased additional property in Petersburg. In 1869, Sussex County voters elected Stevens to the Virginia House of Delegates. A Republican, he was the county's sole delegate.

In 1871 voters from Sussex and adjoining Dinwiddie and Greensville Counties elected Stevens to the Senate of Virginia to replace white Republican David G. Carr. In 1874, he was joined in the Virginia Senate by Joseph P. Evans, who had been born a slave in Dinwiddie County, then won elected to the House of Delegates in 1871, and then in 1874 won an election to represent Petersburg to the Virginia Senate. However, Evans became embroiled in a conflict with Petersburg's Republican boss, former Confederate General William Mahone and lost the next election. Meanwhile, Sussex voters continued re-electing Stevens. Nonetheless, in the changing racial politics of as the century closed, Stevens lost the election of 1879 to Samuel Pickett. Stevens came back to defeat Pickett in 1881, thus again representing Sussex, Dinwiddie and Greensville Counties in the Virginia Senate, but George P. Barham defeated him in 1883. One contemporary called Stevens an "able and scholarly man" and noted his speech had "elegance and grace."

== Death ==
Stevens died of throat cancer in 1889, at age 39, never having married. His house in the historic African American community on Pocahontas Island (now a Petersburg neighborhood) still stands, now owned by a man dedicated to preserving the history of the island's free as well as enslaved blacks.

== See also ==
- African American officeholders from the end of the Civil War until before 1900

== Bibliography ==
- Jackson, Luther Porter (1945). Negro Office-Holders in Virginia, 1865-1895. Guide Quality Press, Norfolk, Virginia. ISBN 9780598580269.
