= List of mayors of Petersburg, Virginia =

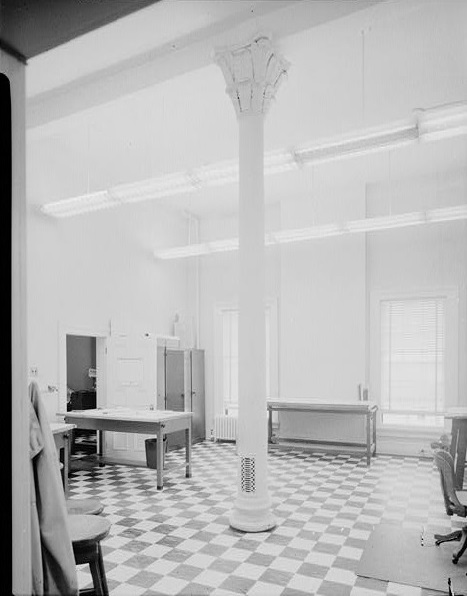
Interior view of Petersburg City Hall building in Virginia, US, in 1991

The following is a list of mayors of the city of Petersburg, Virginia, USA.

== Mayors ==
List of mayors of Petersburg, Virginia from 1784 – till date.
No. (Note: Mayors are numbered according to uninterrupted periods served by the same person. For example, John Dodson served three consecutive terms and is counted as the sixty-ninth mayor, instead of the sixty-ninth, seventieth, and seventy-first, but Robert Bolling and Thomas G. Peachey are counted twice because their two terms were not consecutive. A vice mayor who temporarily becomes acting mayor in the mayor's absence or incapacity is not counted because the mayor remains in office during such a period.)	Portrait	Name (birth–death)	Term	Party (Note: Reflects the mayor's political party at the start of their mayoralty. Changes during their time in office are noted.)	Election	Vice Mayor
1		John Banister	1784 – 1785			
2		Christopher McConnico	1785 – 1786			
3		John Shore	1786 – 1787			
4		Robert Bolling; 1st term	1787 – 1788			
5		Thomas G. Peachey; 1st term	1788 – 1789			
6		Simon Frazer	1789 – 1790			
7		Joseph Westmore	1790 – 1791			
8		Richard Bate	1791 – 1792			
9		Joseph Weisiger	1792 – 1793			
10		William Prentis; 1st term	1793 – 1794			
11		Thomas G. Peachey; 2nd term	1794 – 1795			
12		Robert Bolling; 2nd term	1795 – 1796			
13		Elias Parker	1796 – 1797			
14		William Prentis; 2nd term	1797 – 1798			
15		J. Le Messurier	1798 – 1799			
16		William Harrison	1799 – 1800			
17		David Maitland	1800 – 1801			
18		William Prentis; 3rd term	1801 – 1802			
19		George Pegram	1802 – 1803			
20		Robert Birchett	1803 – 1804			
21		Paul Nash	1804 – 1805			
22		William Prentis; 4th term	1805 – 1806			
23		John McRae	1806 – 1807			
24		Alexander Brown; 2nd term	1807 – 1808			
25		James Byrne	1808 – 1809			
26		Archibald Baugh	1809 – 1810			
27		Joel Hammond	1810 – 1811			
28		William Moore	1811 – 1812			
29		Nathaniel Friend	1812 – 1813			
30		William Bowden	1813 – 1814			
31		Edward Pegram Jr.	1814 – 1815			
32		George H. Jones	1815 – 1816			
33		John Hinton; 1st term	1816 – 1817			
34		Samuel Turner	1817 – 1818			
35		Edmund Pescud	1818 – 1819			
36		John H. Brown; 1st term	1819 – 1820			
37		Thomas Wallace; 1st term	1820 – 1821			
38		John Hinton; 2nd term	1821 – 1822			
39		John Stith	1822 – 1823			
40		John H. Brown; 2nd term	1823 – 1824			
41		Lewis Mabry; 1st term	1824 – 1825			
42		Jabez Smith	1825 – 1826			
43		Samuel Winfree; 1st term	1826 – 1827			
44		Lewis Mabry; 2nd term	1827 – 1828			
45		Joseph Bragg	1828 – 1829			
46		Patrick Durkin	1829 – 1830			
47		Charles F. Osborne	1830 – 1831			
48		Thomas Wallace; 2nd term	1831 – 1832			
49		Samuel Winfree; 2nd term	1832 – 1833			
50		David H. Branch	1833 – 1834			
51		George W. Harrison; 1st term	1834 – 1835			
52		John D. Tanner	1835 – 1836			
53		James McFarland Jr.	1836 – 1837			
54		George W. Harrison; 2nd term	1837 – 1838			
55		Daniel Lyon	1838 – 1839			
56		Robert B. Bolling	1839 – 1840			
57		Stephen G. Wells	1840 – 1841			
58		William Pannill	1841 – 1842			
59		Thomas Branch	1842 – 1843			
60		John Pollard	1843 – 1844			
61		John H. Patterson	1844 – 1845			
62		James B. Cogbill	1845 – 1846			
63		Joseph E. Cox	1846 – 1847			
64		Francis E. Rives (1792–1861)	1847 – 1848	Democratic		
65		J. M. B. Steward (1817–1897)	1848 – 1849			
66		Charles Corling (1806–1877)	1849 – 1850			
67		Andrew Kevan (1800–1888)	1850 – 1851			
68		John Dodson (1821–1879)	1851 – 1854			
69		W. W. Townes (1819–1869)	1854 – 1865	Democratic		
70		Charles Fenton Collier (1828–1899); 1st term	1865 – 1867	Democratic		
71		Rush Burgess (1838–1890)	April 1, 1868 – April 1, 1869			
72		Walter C. Newberry (1835–1912); 1st term	April 1, 1869 – June 1869			
73		W. G. Pearse (1816–1891)	June 1869 – March 1870	Republican		
74		Walter C. Newberry (1835–1912); 2nd term	March 1870 – June 1870 (Note: Resigned from office)	Conservative		
75		J. P. Williamson (1826–1917)	June 8, 1870 – June 30, 1870	Conservative		
76		Franklin Wood (1836–1911)	July 1, 1870 – June 30, 1874	Republican		
77		William F. C. Gregory (1827–1887)	July 1, 1874 – June 30, 1876	Conservative		
78		William E. Cameron (1842–1927)	July 1, 1876 – January 1, 1882	Readjuster		
79		Fletcher H. Archer (1817–1902)	January 2, 1882 – March 23, 1883	Conservative		
80		T. J. Jarratt (1817–1895)	March 23, 1883 – 1888	Republican		
81		Charles Fenton Collier (1828–1899); 2nd term	1888 – 1898	Democratic		
82		John M. Pleasants (1833–1921)	1898 – 1902	Democratic		
83		William M. Jones (1847–1910)	1902 – 1910 (Note: Died in office)	Democratic		
84		George Cameron Jr. (1866–1913)	1910 – 1913	Democratic		
85		Robert Cabaniss (1862–1946)	1913 – 1916	Democratic		
86		Robert Gilliam Sr. (1847–1934)	1916 – 1920	Democratic		
87		Samuel W. Zimmer (1884–1931)	1920 – 1926	Democratic		
88		J. Gordon Bohannan (1880–1947)	1926 – 1928	Democratic		
89		R. T. Wilson (1881–1951)	1928 – 1930	Democratic		
90		I. Val Parham (1881–1961)	1930 – 1931	Democratic		
91		John R. Jolly (1875–1945)	1931 – 1940	Democratic		
92		Alexander Hamilton Jr. (1906–1997)	1940 – 1946	Democratic		
93		William Hodges Mann Jr. (1890–1953)	1946 – 1950	Democratic		
94		Churchill G. Dunn (1904–1989)	1950 – 1956	Democratic		
95		Walter M. Edens (1889–1962)	1956 – 1960	Democratic		
96		Marvin Gill (1904–1975)	1960 – 1964	Democratic		
97		Arlie Andrews (1917–2003)	1964 – 1973	Democratic		
98		Hermanze E. Fauntleroy Jr. (1932–2010); 1st term	1973 – 1974	Democratic		
99		Remmie Arnold Jr. (1920–1985)	1974 – 1976	Democratic		
100		Roland Specter (1932–2010)	1976 – 1976	Democratic		
101		Hermanze E. Fauntleroy Jr. (1932–2010); 2nd term	1976 – 1980	Democratic		
102		LeRoy B. Roper (1920–1997)	1980 – 1984	Democratic		
103		Wilson Cheely (1917–2007)	1984 – 1984	Democratic		
104		Florence Farley (1928–2022)	1984 – 1990	Democratic		
105		Charles H. Cuthbert IV (1917–2004)	1990 – 1992	Democratic		
106		Rosalyn Dance (b. 1948)	July 1992 – June 30, 2004	Democratic		
107		Annie Mickens (b. 1949)	July 2004 – December 31, 2010	Democratic		
108		Brian Moore (b. 1962)	January 2011 – December 31, 2014	Democratic	2010	
108		Brian Moore (b. 1962)	January 2011 – December 31, 2014	Democratic	2012	
109		W. Howard Myers (b. 1959)	January 2015 – December 31, 2016	Democratic	2014	Samuel Parham
110		Samuel Parham (b. 1975)	January 3, 2017 – Incumbent	Democratic	2016	John Hart
110		Samuel Parham (b. 1975)	January 3, 2017 – Incumbent	Democratic	2018	John Hart
110		Samuel Parham (b. 1975)	January 3, 2017 – Incumbent	Democratic	2020	Annette Smith-Lee
110		Samuel Parham (b. 1975)	January 3, 2017 – Incumbent	Democratic	2022	Darrin Hill
110		Samuel Parham (b. 1975)	January 3, 2017 – Incumbent	Democratic	2024	Darrin Hill

== See also ==
- History of Petersburg, Virginia
