= Gillfield Baptist Church (Petersburg, Virginia) =

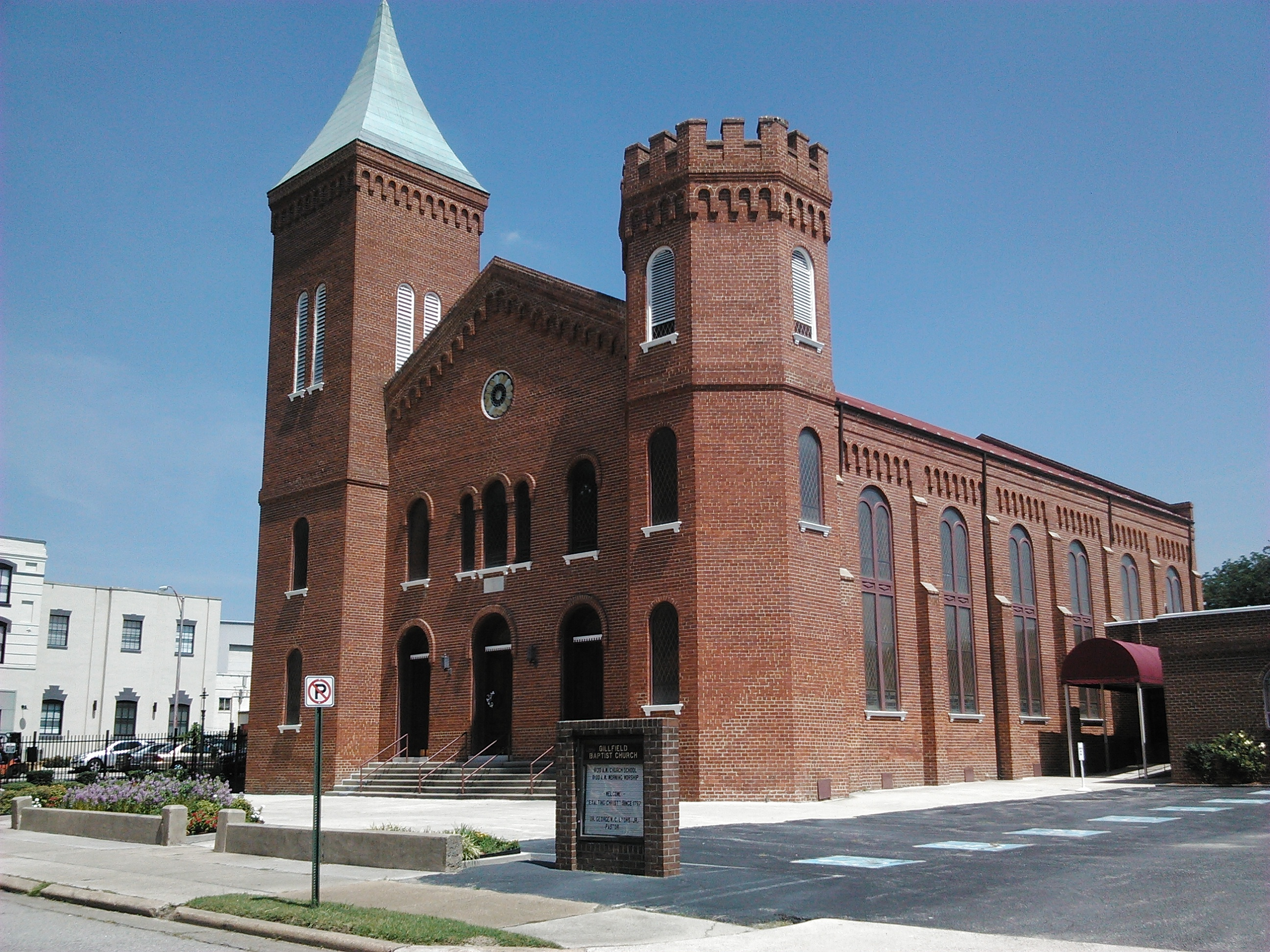
- Gillfield Baptist Church, Petersburg
- Gillfield Baptist Church
- 37.2235°N 77.4077°W
- Location: 209 Perry Street, Petersburg, Virginia
- Country: United States
- Denomination: Baptist
- Website: www.gillfieldbaptistchurchpetersburg.org/

Architecture
- Heritage designation: Virginia
- Completed: 1797

Gillfield Baptist Church is the second-oldest black Baptist congregation in Petersburg, Virginia and one of the oldest in the nation. It has the oldest handwritten record book of any black church. It was organized in 1797 as a separate, integrated congregation. In 1818 it built its first church at its current lot on Perry Street.

In 1957 its ninth pastor the Rev. Wyatt Tee Walker (1953–1959), co-founded the Southern Christian Leadership Conference, led the congregation in the Civil Rights Movement in Petersburg. It continues to serve the community today.

== History ==
The church originated in Prince Edward County, Virginia, in 1786, as the Davenport Church. In 1797, it was recognized as a separate institution with an integrated congregation which also included slave and free members.

In 1800, the black majority of Davenport Church moved to Pocahontas Island, the center of the growing free black community of Petersburg. It took the name of Sandy Beach Baptist Church.

In 1818, the church members purchased a lot on Perry Street in the Gillfield neighborhood of central Petersburg (named for Revolutionary veteran Erasmus Gill who laid out the streets before 1798). They built the first of what would be four successive church buildings at this site. The current church was constructed from 1874 to 1879.

These were the earliest decades of the Baptist Church in Virginia, influenced by preachers from New England who generated revivals. As more churches were started, members came together in an association in the southeast. In 1781 it split into two parts along state lines for Virginia and North Carolina. The twenty-one congregations in Virginia formed the Portsmouth Baptist Association. Representatives worked together to form church policy. From 1810 to 1828 they began to work on Foreign Missions and Christian Education.

Admitted to the Portsmouth Baptist Association in 1810, Gillfield Baptist then had 270 members. Free blacks continued to migrate to Petersburg. By 1821 Gillfield Baptist had the largest congregation within the association. At 441 members, it was more than twice as large as the next ranking church. While it had free blacks taking active roles, the church was led by white pastors in some of its early years. In addition, through the regional Baptist associations, whites tried to keep control over black congregations. They also began to restrict activities by black members.

In 1829 the Portsmouth Baptist Association tried to force the congregation of Gillfield Baptist into a consolidation with the white congregation of Market Street Church. It was another way for whites to try to exert control over a congregation. The Gillfield members resisted and stayed at their own church. But, that year they did have to accede to having members of Market Street Church represent them in Portsmouth Association meetings, a situation that lasted until after the American Civil War and emancipation. For years before this, they had been represented by free blacks such as Israel Decoudry, of West Indian descent. In 1838 the Gillfield congregation made another appeal to the Portsmouth Association to select their own delegate, but they were refused. After Nat Turner's slave rebellion of 1831, the state legislature passed a bill requiring that every congregation have a white minister leading it, to try to control the message which congregations would hear. They wanted preachers to stress the duty of blacks to stay in their places.

Minutes of church and association meetings show they struggled with issues of Christianity within a slave society. The pressures and narrow edge kept by black congregations can be demonstrated by the fact that Gillfield Baptist dismissed more than one enslaved member for running away. They upheld an ideal of duty over the person's desire to be free.

After the Civil War, in 1865 the congregation called Reverend Henry Williams (1831–1900) as the first black minister of Gillfield Baptist Church since 1831. He served as the pastor from 1865 to 1900, leading the congregation through major changes during and after the Reconstruction era. The church left the Portsmouth Association and joined a state black Baptist convention, aided by the Consolidated American Baptist Convention, to escape the supervision of whites. This was the forerunner of the National Baptist Convention, USA.

Like many ministers, Williams was a leader in the larger community as well. He was elected to the City Council of Petersburg during Reconstruction. A leading advocate of black teachers for black students, Williams encouraged students in teaching careers. He was politically active into the 1880s.

The current historic church was constructed in 1874–1879 at 209 Perry Street.

== 20th century ==
From 1953 to 1959, Rev. Wyatt Tee Walker led Gillfield Baptist Church. A confidant of Rev. Martin Luther King Jr., whom he had met when they were both in divinity school, Walker led efforts in Petersburg to end racial segregation. With King, he was a co-founder of the Southern Christian Leadership Conference (SCLC). Gillfield Baptist was used for mass meetings to educate people and to prepare for demonstrations. Walker was arrested numerous times in the civil rights struggle, the first when he led a group from the church into the "white" public library. He also founded the Petersburg Improvement Association (PIA), a group modeled on the Montgomery Improvement Association (MIA) in Alabama, which developed strategy and tactics for the local Civil Rights Movement. By May 1960 the PIA had 3,000 members from the Petersburg area.

Walker left Gillfield Baptist to become executive director of the SCLC in Atlanta, Georgia from 1960 to 1964. These were years when he helped it develop effective strategy and national prominence in civil rights actions, including the Birmingham campaign and the March on Washington.

His successor, Grady W. Powell, Sr., Gillfield's tenth pastor, led the congregation from 1961 until his retirement at age 65 in 1997, and participated in several Freedom Marches as well. When Rev. Powell began his ministry at Gillfield, eggs were thrown at his door, he received threatening phone calls at home at midnight, and a cross was burned in front of the church during a 1963 revival service (for which police soon arrested a suspect). In 1970, Gillfield Baptist Church made history again when under Powell's auspices, the church ordained seven women as deacons, including: Dr.Louise J. Thompson, Martha E. Moorefield, Thelma Mitchell, and Lula Allgood. Following Rev. Powell's retirement Rev. Dr. George W. C. Lyons led the congregation, and Rev. Powell became interim pastor at several churches (mostly in Richmond, Virginia). An active congregation keeps Gillfield Baptist Church at the center of community life in Petersburg.
