= Wyatt Tee Walker =

American civil rights activist and pastor (1928–2018)

Wyatt Walker
- Born: Wyatt Tee Walker; August 16, 1928; Brockton, Massachusetts, U.S.
- Died: January 23, 2018 (aged 89); Chester, Virginia, U.S.
- Education: Virginia Union University (BS, MDiv); Colgate Rochester Divinity School (DMin)
- Occupations: Pastor; civil rights leader; theologian; cultural historian
- Years active: 1953–2004
- Awards: Presidential Medal of Freedom

Wyatt Tee Walker (August 16, 1928 – January 23, 2018) was an African-American pastor, national civil rights leader, theologian, and cultural historian. He was a chief of staff for Martin Luther King Jr., and in 1958 became an early board member of the Southern Christian Leadership Conference (SCLC). He helped found a Congress for Racial Equality (CORE) chapter in 1958. As executive director of the SCLC from 1960 to 1964, Walker helped to bring the group to national prominence. Walker sat at the feet of his mentor, BG Crawley, who was a Baptist Minister in Brooklyn, NY and New York State Judge.

Walker started as pastor at historic Gillfield Baptist Church in Petersburg, Virginia, where he entered the Civil Rights Movement. For 37 years Walker was senior pastor at Canaan Baptist Church of Christ in Harlem, New York, where he also co-founded the Religious Action Network of Africa Action to oppose apartheid in South Africa, and chaired the Central Harlem Local Development Corporation.

== Early life and education ==
Walker was born in Massachusetts, raised primarily in New Jersey where he attended Merchantville High School and received his bachelor's in physics and chemistry and his Master of Divinity at Virginia Union University in Richmond, Virginia.

== Career ==
=== Virginia ===
After earning his degree, in 1953 Walker was called as pastor at historic Gillfield Baptist Church, the second oldest black church in Petersburg, Virginia and one of the oldest in the nation. In his leadership for social justice and against segregation, he was arrested numerous times, the first for leading an African-American group into the "white" library in Petersburg. His "flamboyant" and cheeky style was shown as he "caused a stir" by trying to "check out Douglas Southall Freeman's admiring biography of Robert E. Lee." In 1953 Walker worked with citizens who filed suit in federal court for access to a public pool in Lee Park. The city closed the park in 1954 rather than integrate. The park later reopened, but the city never operated the pool again.

Walker's led two major civil rights organizations in Virginia: he served as president for five years of the Petersburg branch of the National Association for the Advancement of Colored People (NAACP) and as state director of the Congress of Racial Equality (CORE), which he co-founded in 1958. Walker also helped found the Petersburg Improvement Association (PIA), modeled after the Montgomery Improvement Association (MIA) in Alabama. It developed strategies against segregation, including publicizing its activities. By May 1960 the PIA had 3,000 members. By conducting sit-ins in 1960 at the Trailways bus terminal, Walker and PIA members gained agreement by the president of the Bus Terminal Restaurants to desegregate lunch counters in Petersburg and several other Virginia cities. This was achieved the year before the Freedom Riders arrived in 1961.

Through these years Walker became increasingly close to Dr. Martin Luther King Jr. in the civil rights movement and later served as his chief of staff. In 1957 Walker helped found the Southern Christian Leadership Conference (SCLC). In 1958 King chose Walker for the board of SCLC. Walker spent the next two years building the organization in Virginia by capitalizing on his network of relationships with clergy throughout the state from his activities with NAACP and CORE. He also continued demonstrations and actions intended to highlight, challenge and end segregation.

=== Atlanta, Georgia ===
External videos
- “Eyes on the Prize; Interview with Wyatt Tee Walker” conducted in 1985 for the Eyes on the Prize documentary in which he discusses his participation in the civil rights movement of the 1960s.

At King's invitation, Walker moved to Atlanta as the SCLC's first full-time executive director. During his leadership of 1960–1964, he brought the organization to "national power" in its efforts to bring about an end to legal segregation of African Americans. A strong manager, Walker (assisted by Dorothy Cotton and James Wood brought from the PIA) improved administration and fundraising, and coordinated the staff's far-ranging activities.

Walker preached "dazzling sermons" to support the student sit-ins that sparked the second phase of civil rights organizing after 1960. He was also the chief strategist and tactician for "Project C", the detailed plan for confrontation with local police and city officials that was the heart of the first phase of the Birmingham Campaign in 1963. Assisted by local movement secretary Lola Hendricks, Walker meticulously researched protest targets, timed the walking distance from the 16th Street Baptist Church (the campaign's headquarters) to the downtown area; surveyed the segregated lunch counters of department stores; and listed federal buildings as secondary targets should police block the protesters' entrance into primary targets such as stores, libraries, and all-white churches. He ensured the campaign would receive national attention and build support for the cause. The events captured important national media attention and coverage, as Walker discussed in detail when interviewed by Robert Penn Warren for the book Who Speaks for the Negro?. This was critical for gaining national support among American citizens and the Kennedy administration for the movement and its goals. Walker also helped organize and participated in the 1963 March on Washington. In 1964 and 1965 he celebrated the movement's successes when President Lyndon Johnson signed the Civil Rights Act and Voting Rights Act.

From 1964 to 1966 Walker worked with a new publishing venture, the Negro Heritage Library, which he headed as president in 1966. He worked with school boards and systems to expand curricula to improve coverage of African-American history and literature, and to add appropriate books to school libraries.

=== Harlem, New York ===
As a new Pastor in Harlem, Walker learned all that he knew and sat at the feet of his mentor Reverend Dr. BG Crawley Pastor and founder of the Little Zion Baptist Church, who was a Baptist Minister and New York State Judge in Brooklyn New York.

In 1967 Walker was called as senior pastor of the influential Canaan Baptist Church of Christ in Harlem, New York, where he commanded a major pulpit in the struggle for tolerance and social justice. He also continued to compose sacred music. He connected his studies of other traditions to the use of music in the black church and social movements. Walker helped teach people about the relationship between movements around the world. During the years in which Africans sought independence, Walker hosted numerous leaders from the continent, including Nelson Mandela of South Africa, who were active in struggles against colonialism and apartheid.

During the 1970s Walker served as Urban Affairs Specialist to Gov. Nelson A. Rockefeller, helping advise in a volatile social environment. In 1975 he completed his doctorate at Colgate Rochester Divinity School. In his graduate studies and research, Walker also studied at the University of Ife in Nigeria and the University of Ghana. During these years in Harlem, he wrote and published books on the relation of music and social movements, and community development.

Walker was increasingly active in the anti-apartheid movement, which had a strong base in the African-American community. In 1978 he founded the International Freedom Mobilization to draw attention to the abuses of apartheid in South Africa. He served on the National Committee on the American Committee on Africa (ACOA) (since 2001 called Africa Action). In the 1980s he served on the ACOA Board, including as president.

In 1988, during the height of the anti-apartheid struggle Walker helped co-found the Religious Action Network (RAN) of the ACOA, together with Canon Frederick B. Williams of the Church of the Intercession in Harlem.

In 1989, Walker and the Canaan Baptist Church teamed up with the United States Department of Housing and Urban Development to sponsor a $7 million, 63,000-square-foot, 80-unit senior living facility on Frederick Douglass Boulevard in Harlem. The building was named Wyatt Tee Walker Senior Housing.

Walker also used the church's leadership in local economic and community development, writing about their efforts in The Harvard Paper: The African-American Church and Economic Development (1994). He was chair of the Central Harlem Local Development Corporation, to generate affordable housing units in Harlem to fill a critical need.

Because of Walker's leading role in the Civil Rights Movement, the Schomburg Center for Research in Black Culture at the New York Public Library collected his papers from the period of 1963–1982. They include both personal and official correspondence, papers and lectures on a wide variety of topics, and are available for research.

Since college, Walker has been a member of the Gamma chapter of Alpha Phi Alpha fraternity.

=== Return to Virginia ===
After 37 years as senior pastor, Walker retired in 2004 with the title of pastor emeritus of Canaan Baptist Church. He spent his final years in Virginia and taught at the Samuel DeWitt Proctor School of Theology at his alma mater Virginia Union University in Richmond.

== Public education reform and charter schools ==
Frustrated by the perpetual failure of the traditional public schools in Harlem and other underserved neighborhoods, Walker helped organize the passage of New York State's charter school law in 1998.

In 1999, he joined with businessman-philanthropist Steve Klinsky to found the first ever charter school in New York State, now named the Sisulu-Walker Charter School of Harlem in honor of Walter Sisulu (Nelson Mandela's ally) and Dr. Walker. This school was one of just three New York charter schools to open in the law's first year of 1999, and is the only one from that year to survive. The school is community-run and has substantially outperformed the traditional public schools in Harlem's District 5, where most of the school's students live. The founding and history of Sisulu-Walker was described in the book "A Light Shines In Harlem" by Mary Bounds, which won the Phillis Wheatly Prize for best non-fiction work in 2015. Walker wrote the foreword for that book.

Walker continues to support charter school reform from his home in Virginia. In 2016, he was awarded the Lifetime Achievement Award from the National Charter School Alliance. This award had only been given once before: to President Bill Clinton.

In September 2016, Walker gave an exclusive interview to RealClearLife.com where he stressed his support for charter schools as a key civil rights issue of our time, and where he stated his strong belief that Dr. King would have supported charter schools as well.

=== Opposition to critical race theory ===
In September 2015, Walker wrote an essay for Real Clear Politics along with Steve Klinsky. In this essay Walker and Klinsky called for a fundamental respect for all people, considered as individuals without regards to race, and expressed opposition to theories such as critical race theory that classifies people primarily as members of racial groups.

== Personal life and death ==
Walker married Theresa Ann Walker in December 1950. They had four children together. Walker died on January 23, 2018, at his home in Chester, Virginia, aged 89.

== Selected books ==
Walker had an ongoing interest in the relationship between music, the black religious tradition, and social change, and published several books on this topic. This topic was also the center of his doctoral work for his PhD in 1975. These include:

- 1979 – Somebody's Calling My Name: Black Sacred Music and Social Change (Judson Press)
- 1984 – The Soul of Black Worship: A Trilogy – Preaching, Praying, Singing (Self-published)
- 1985 – Road to Damascus: A Journey of Faith, New York: Martin Luther King Fellows Press
- 1986 – Common Thieves: A Tithing Manual for Christians and Others, New York: Martin Luther King Fellows Press
- 1991 – Gospel in the Land of the Rising Sun, New York: Martin Luther King Fellows Press
- 1994 – The Harvard Paper: The African-American Church and Economic Development, New York: Martin Luther King Fellows Press
- 1997 – A Prophet from Harlem Speaks: Sermons & Essays, New York: Martin Luther King Fellows Press

== Legacy and honors ==
- Honorary doctorates from Virginia Union University and Princeton University
- 1993 – Ebony magazine named Rev. Dr. Walker as one of "The 15 Greatest Black Preachers".
- 2005 – The Sisulu Children's Academy—Harlem Public Charter School was renamed the Sisulu-Walker Charter School of Harlem, in honor of his community leadership.
- 2007, students in Norfolk, Virginia produced and performed a show entitled Walking with Walker.
- 2008, Walker was inducted into the International Civil Rights Walk of Fame at the Martin Luther King Jr. National Historical Park.

== See also ==
- List of civil rights leaders
