= Pocahontas Island =

Peninsula in Virginia, US

- Pocahontas Island Historic District
- U.S. National Register of Historic Places
- U.S. Historic district
- Virginia Landmarks Register
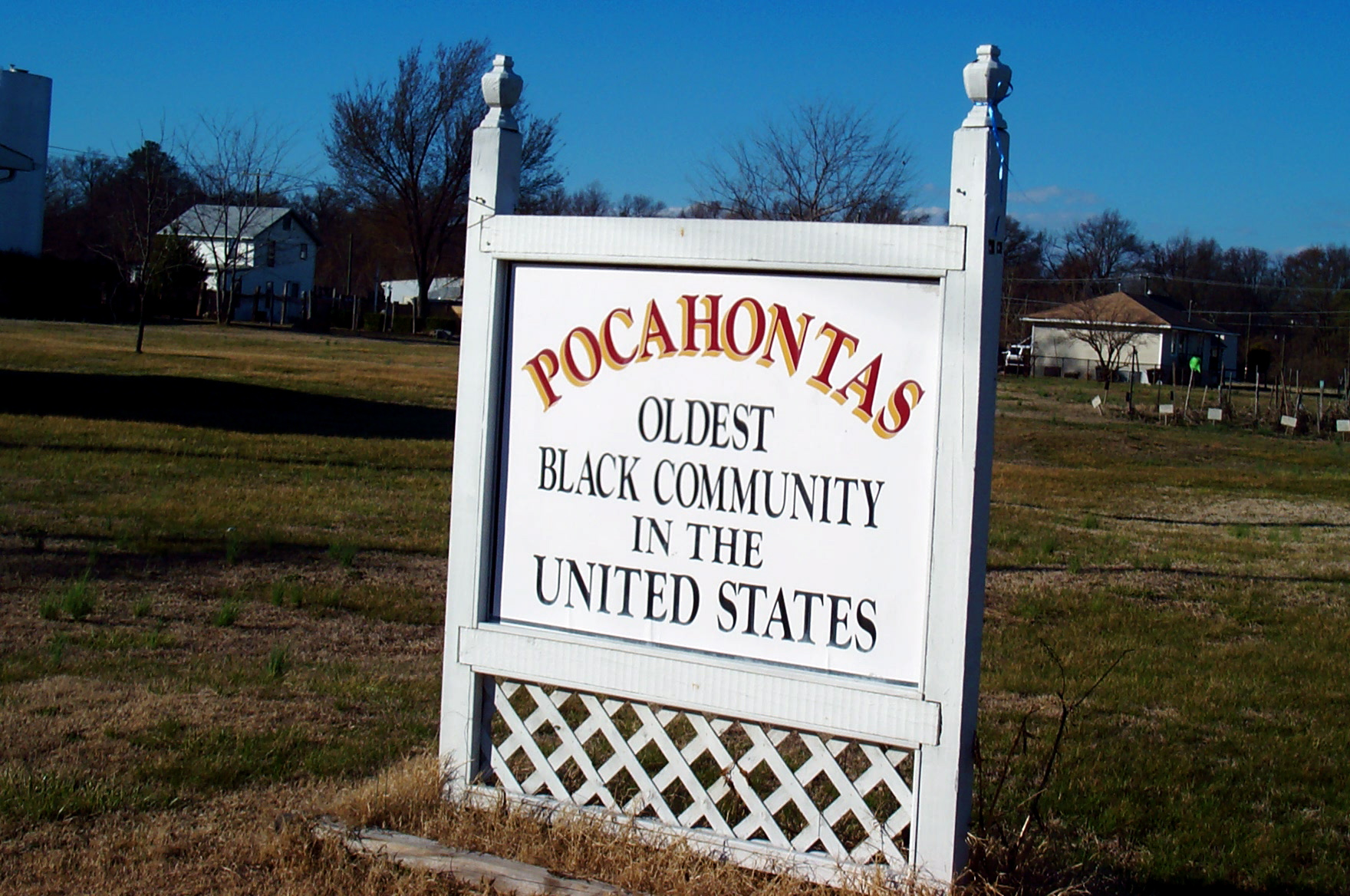
- Pocahontas Island welcome sign

- Location within Virginia Location within the United States
- Location: Pocahontas, Witten, Rolfe, Logan, and Sapony Sts., Petersburg, Virginia
- Coordinates: 37°14′19″N 77°23′59″W
- Built: 1952
- Architect: Lee, William Edward, Jr.
- Architectural style: Federal, Bungalow/Craftsman
- NRHP reference No.: 06000977
- VLR No.: 123-0114

Significant dates
- Added to NRHP: November 03, 2006
- Designated VLR: September 6, 2006

Pocahontas Island is a peninsula in Petersburg, Virginia, once on the opposite side of the Appomattox River from Petersburg. Since 1915 a new channel for the river separated it from Chesterfield County and the former channel no longer separates it from the city. Once a warehouse and wharf-filled urban landscape initially platted in 1749, the island was devastated by a 1993 tornado before citizen involvement caused creation of the Pocahontas Island Historic District, which in 2006 achieved listing on the National Register of Historic Places (NRHP) as a historic district because of its significance in African-American history and for its prehistoric indigenous archeological assets.

Archeologists found evidence of prehistoric American settlement dating from 6500 B.C. The indigenous Appomattoc people inhabited this region and encountered European colonists by the early 18th century, when the first enslaved Africans were brought to work here.

In the 19th century, Pocahontas Island became a notable freedom colony, the first predominantly free black settlement in the state and, by mid-19th century, one of the largest in the nation (although enslaved people also lived on the island, and some free blacks owned slaves). In 1860 slightly more than half of Petersburg's population was black, and 3,224 or one-third of those people were free; they constituted the largest free black population of the time. During the 20th century, the island's population declined as people moved north in the Great Migration. In 1975 residents secured renewed residential zoning to protect their neighborhoods from industrial development proposed by the city.

== History ==
Archaeological evidence of a prehistoric Native American community dated to 6500 BC has been found on the island. This is at the beginning of the Middle Archaic Period (6500 BC to 3000 BC) or end of Early Archaic Period (8000 BC to 6500 BC)

When European colonists first arrived in Virginia and established the colonial settlement of Jamestown in 1607, the Appomattoc people who were part of the Powhatan Confederacy inhabited this region. The first colonial settlement on the peninsula was established in the 18th century. A group of enslaved Africans were brought here in 1732 to work in John Bolling's tobacco warehouses. Colonial surveyors platted the land in 1749, and white settlers named the village "Wittontown." When formally organized as a town in 1752, it was renamed Pocahontas after the Native American daughter of Powhatan, who was important in early Virginian colonial history and, together with her husband, John Rolfe, became an ancestor of numerous First Families of Virginia.

=== Free Black settlement ===
In 1757 Petersburg built a bridge to link the peninsula to the city, and for some early years, a board of trustees managed the "island" and its development. Incorporated within the city limits in 1784 after the American Revolutionary War, the Pocahontas Island neighborhood became a center of a free black population. Pocahontas Island's large free black residential community is the oldest in the nation and its commercial center developed into a destination for the state's free blacks. By 1797 free blacks established the Sandy River Baptist Church, and some members in 1818 moved across the then-river channel into the city's center and built the Gillfield Baptist Church. The growth of industrial jobs attracted free blacks to Petersburg. Artisans and craftsmen could make a living, while others worked as boatmen and fishermen on the river. By 1860, Petersburg's population was half black - of those, one-third were free. It was the largest free black population in the nation.

=== Rail development ===
From 1830 until 1860, Pocahontas island's (recently excavated 30x300 foot) railroad depot was the terminus of the Richmond and Petersburg Railroad. It was Petersburg's main freight and passenger station until the American Civil War, when it also transported many Confederate troops and supplies. The island was filled with many wharves and warehouses, in addition to residential streets. No sign of the Confederate fortifications on the island remains, and the short railroad line built in 1863 to simplify transshipment of goods from Norfolk and Danville railroad lines to Richmond via Petersburg was removed immediately after the war; the Union Corps filed many reports of railroad activity on Pocahontas during the war. However, Petersburg City's government, despite building another bridge in 1851, often neglected the neighborhood, usually more concerned with development in white areas. Numerous antebellum houses survive, especially on the island's east end, and archeologists have also unearthed the foundations of the railroad depot and the Petersburg Distilling Company, Inc. (1911-1916). Two surviving houses were linked to the Underground Railroad before the American Civil War: the Jarratt House (808-810 Logan Street, predates 1820 on tax records and is the island's sole surviving brick building), and the double house at 215 Witten Street is informally called the "Underground Railroad House" (predating 1838, it once had a pseudo-brick facade). The island's remaining 19th-century houses were built in the "shotgun style" usually associated with larger southern cities such as New Orleans, Houston, Atlanta and Louisville to make maximum use of narrow urban lots as well as local ventilation patterns.

=== After the Civil War ===
It took decades for Petersburg to rebuild after the American Civil War, although one railroad line was rebuilt sufficiently by November 1867 for General Robert E. Lee to stop at the city en route to his son's wedding. Pocahontas had mixed industrial, commercial and residential use, including a sawmill by 1877 and a powder magazine on land now occupied by a waste treatment plant. Postwar employment cycles continued to affect less educated blacks severely, especially the Panic of 1893. The original Pocahontas Chapel was built at the war's end by the New York Freedman's Relief Society, and also served as a school for freedmen. Destroyed by the 1993 windstorm, it was rebuilt and remains a community center. Although the original building was locally rumored to have once served as a headquarters for General Grant at nearby City Point (Hopewell, Virginia) and transported to Pocahontas, that building was actually dismantled and taken to for an exhibition, and most of the City Point structures were tents. After the war, Pocahontas-born free black William N. Stevens became a lawyer and the first African American to serve in both houses of the Virginia General Assembly, although his legislative district centered on nearby Sussex County. Stevens maintained a house on the island (which still survives), though he died relatively young of throat cancer in 1889.

Increasing industrialization in Petersburg and nearby Hopewell provided continued opportunities for blacks, even though the white-dominated Virginia legislature imposed racial segregation and disfranchisement in the late 19th century. Ice, coal, oil and lumber companies operated on Pocahontas by the early 20th century, although the island suffered devastating floods in 1910 and 1920, and the river rechannelled midway between. Furthermore, the DuPont company established a munitions factory in nearby Hopewell by 1914, and although that city burned the following year, it then prospered, and many blacks chose to live on Pocahontas. Largely excluded from the political system, blacks created their own opportunities. As the 20th century progressed, the more ambitious and younger people tended to leave the island (and many southern states) for other opportunities. The Great Migration to northern industrial cities, starting about World War I, is the time Islanders refer to as "when they lost the 'cream of the crop', and the majority of the remaining population being elderly retirees who sustain themselves on small fixed incomes." The neighborhood shared economic troubles with Petersbburg, which lost jobs to other areas and increasingly to Richmond, long the state capital and which became the region's and state's financial center.

In 1971 the Petersburg city government rezoned some of the island for light industrial use. This caused the homes of 250 residents to be threatened with condemnation, making it impossible for owners to get financing for renovations. In 1975 residents won a battle to restore residential zoning. Allied groups began to survey and document the many historic properties. The Pocahontas Island Historic District was added to the National Register of Historic Places in 2006 because of its abundance of archaeological sites from prehistory through historic times, and of numerous antebellum buildings marking its history as a free black community.

A 1993 tornado severely damaged some houses and the chapel, and in 2015 the neighborhood was still listed among the state's most endangered historic sites. By the late 20th century, the population had declined to fewer than 100 on the island from a high of 1700 earlier.

== Recognition ==
Because of its significant resources, ranging from prehistoric to historic, the Pocahontas Island Historic District is listed on both the Virginia Landmarks Register and the National Register of Historic Places (NRHP). It is also the location of the Pocahontas Island Black History Museum.
